= List of members of the African Company of Merchants =

The African Company of Merchants was established by Act of Parliament as a successor organisation to the Royal African Company in 1752. Provision was made for interested citizens to join the corporation in three cities: at foundation there were 135 members in London,157 in Bristol and 101 in Liverpool, which nevertheless had the most extensive participation in slave trade.

== Liverpool members ==
=== Founding members ===
The following list of 101 names was published on 24 June 1752. Several were MPs for Liverpool at some stage in their lives.

- John Armitage
- John Atherton
- John Ashton
- John Backhouse
- Thomas Ball
- William Benson
- Joseph Bird
- John Blackburn
- Bryan Blundell
- Jonathan Blundell
- Richard Blundell
- William Blundell
- John Bostock
- George Bradley
- Edward Bridge
- George Brooks
- Joseph Brooks
- Jonathan Brooks
- William Bulkeley
- George Campbell
- Thomas Chalmer
- Robert Clay
- John Clayton
- George Clews
- Charles Craven
- John Crompton
- James Crosbie
- Thomas Crowder
- Ellis Cunliffe
- Foster Cunliffe (1682–1758)
- Robert Cunliffe
- Joseph Davis
- Edward Dean
- William Dobb
- Thomas Dunbar
- Ralph Earl
- David Eddie
- Elliott Ellams
- Joseph Farmer
- Edward Forbes
- Richard Ford
- Potter Fletcher
- James Gildart
- Richard Gildart (MP for Liverpool,1734-1754)
- John Goodwin
- William Goodwin
- Charles Goore
- James Gordon
- John Gorrell
- Robert Hallhead
- John Hardman (MP for Liverpool,1754-1756)
- Henry Hardwar
- Arthur Heywood
- Benjamin Heywood
- Robert Hesketh
- William Higginson
- Captain John Hughes
- Richard Hughes
- Thomas Kendall
- John Knight
- George Laidler
- Thomas Leatherbarrow
- Pierce Lee
- Charles Lowndes
- Edward Lowndes
- Thomas Mears
- Joseph Manesty
- Richard Nicholas
- John Nicholson
- Edmund Ogden
- Samuel Ogden
- Isaac Oldham
- John Okill
- James Pardoe
- John Parker
- Edward Parr
- John Parr
- William Penket
- William Pole
- Owen Pritchard
- Samuel Reed
- William Rowe
- Richard Savage
- Robert Seel
- Thomas Seel
- Samuel Shaw
- Robert Smith, (Broad Street, London)
- Samuel Smith
- John Strong
- Matthew Strong
- John Tarleton
- Henry Townsend
- Richard Townsend
- Edward Trafford
- Levinus Unsworth
- Christo Whytell
- William Whalley
- Henry Lane White
- John Williamson
- William Williamson
