= Edward Parr =

English slave trader

- Born: 26 February 1718; Liverpool, England, Great Britain
- Died: February 1768 (aged 49–50)
- Burial place: Liverpool, England, United Kingdom
- Children: 2 daughters

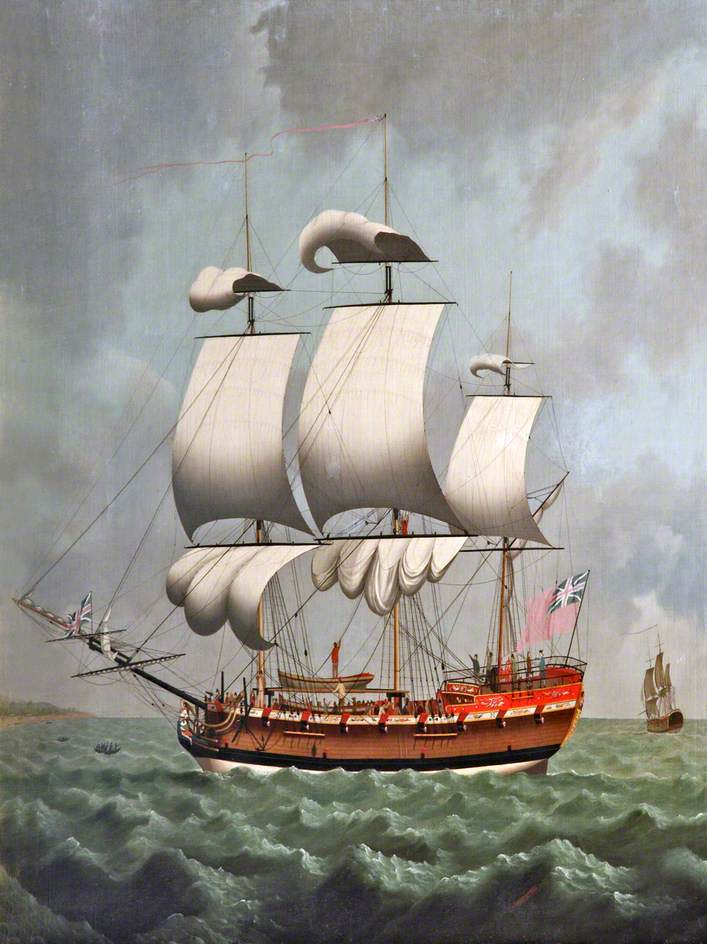
A Liverpool slave ship

Edward Parr (26 February 1718 - February 1768) was an English slave trader, apothecary and merchant of Liverpool. He was involved in 51 slave voyages, operating out of the Port of Liverpool between 1750 and 1768. Parr owned a slave ship called Briton, whose captain employed an African pirate called Captain Lemma Lemma to capture and enslave people with his war canoes. Parr was a member of the African Company of Merchants.

== Early life ==
Parr was born in Liverpool, the son of Jonas Parr, apothecary, of Castle Street. His grandfather was also Edward Parr, of Haysom in Rainford, of a family settled there as small landowners in the 15th century, established in Liverpool as merchants and shipowners by the late 17th century. He was a first cousin of the merchant and mayor of Liverpool John Parr.

== Slave trade ==
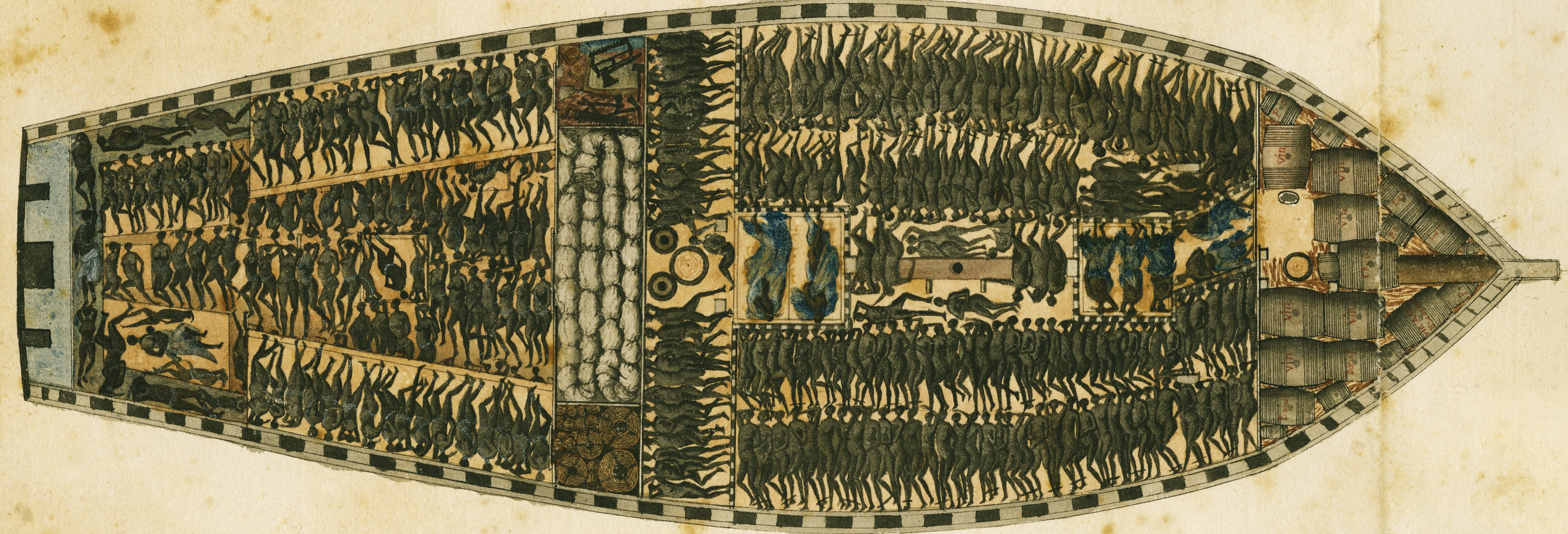
A painting from circa 1770, showing shackled Africans on a slave ship

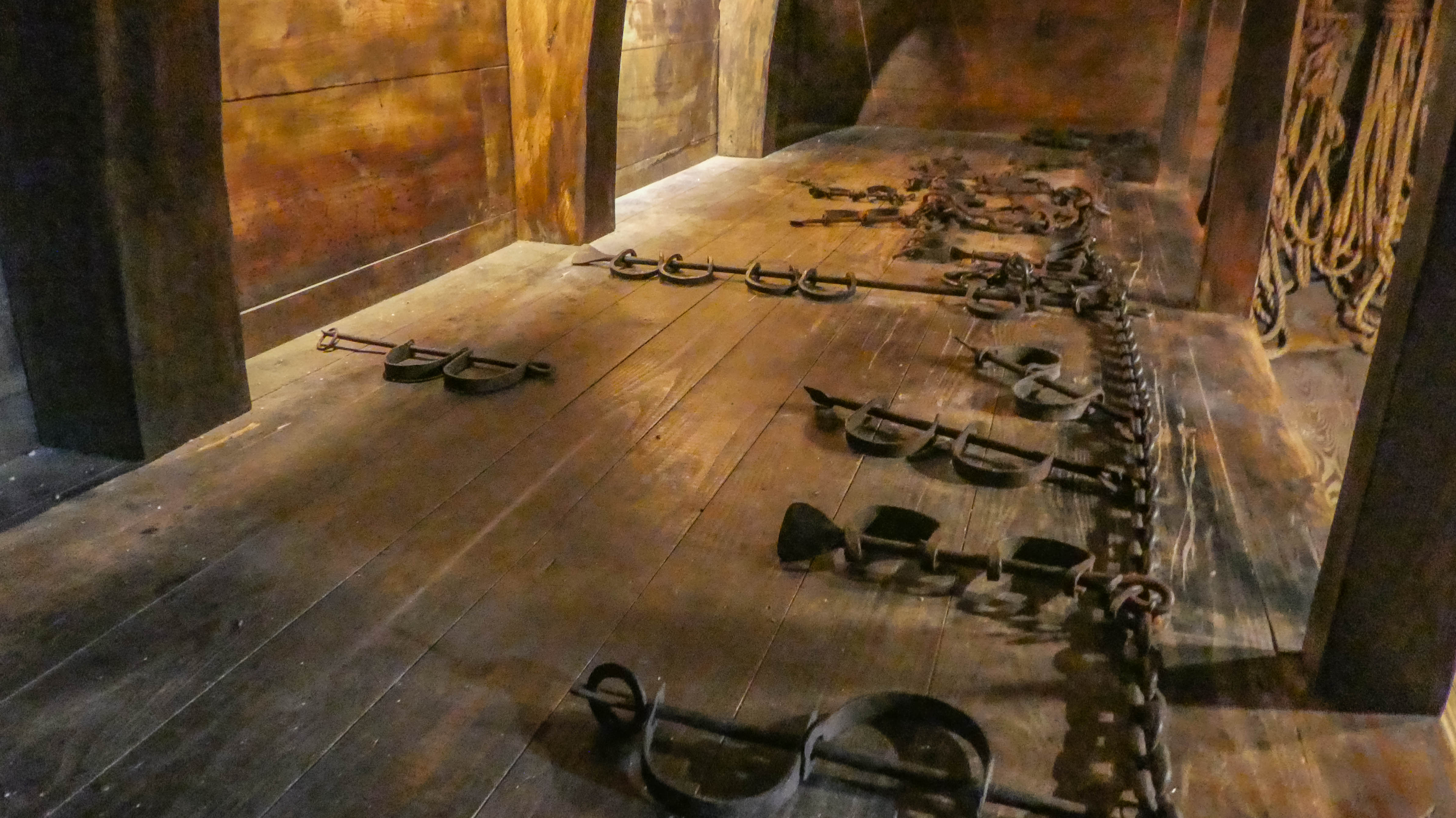
Slave shackles

Edward Parr continued his father's business as an apothecary and general merchant in Castle Street, Liverpool. He became a slave trader with West Africa, the Caribbean and Chesapeake Bay, and reputedly became the second richest man in Liverpool, as documented in the letter books of his assistant, Joshua Dixon. He was involved in 51 slave voyages between the years of 1750 and 1768.

Parr and John Welch owned a slave-ship called Briton and in 1762 it was sent on a slave voyage to the Kingdom of Whydah in West Africa. One day in 1763, the Briton was moored in the Bight of Benin being surrounded by 10 war canoes. The war canoes were owned by Captain Lemma Lemma, an African pirate leader who captured people and sold them to the slave traders. The captain of the Briton, William Bagshaw, had been entertaining Lemma Lemma for 10 days while he and his men captured people. Bagshaw had been offering food, drink, hospitality and gifts in order to encourage Lemma Lemma. Three people in a canoe came sailing down the River Formosa, oblivious to the danger they were in. Upon sighting them, Lemma Lemma ordered his crew to hunt them down and bring them to the Briton. The three people captured were an elderly father and his adult son and daughter. Bagshaw agreed to buy the two younger people but refused to buy the old man. Upon completion of the sale Lemma Lemma sent the old man back to his war canoe and ordered that "his head was laid on one of the thwarts of the boat, and chopped off". Thereafter his head and body were thrown overboard, his son and daughter were taken to Rappahannock in Virginia, where they were sold into slavery.

In 1749, a French vessel called Le Lion D'Or was captured by a Liverpool privateer. It was then converted into a whaling vessel and renamed the Golden Lion. She became Liverpool's first whaling vessel. In 1750, Golden Lion sailed from Liverpool to a fishery off Greenland on its first whaling voyage. Edward Parr and other slave traders took a share of the vessel. Gomer Williams opines "for one whale's blubber melted by their agency, they might have counted thousands of human hearts either stilled for ever, or crushed by lifelong slavery."

On 13 February 1759, Edward Parr and forty-four other Liverpool merchants and shipowners wrote a letter to Robert Williamson of Williamson's Liverpool Advertiser. Britain was involved in the Seven Years' War and they were asking him not to print a list of ships sailing from the port. They remarked they had "too much reason to apprehend" that it had "been of very bad consequence this war."

Parr was a member of the African Company of Merchants whose purpose was to lobby in favour of the slave trade. The first meeting of the company took place in Liverpool, on 14 July 1777. The Committee meeting took place every Monday morning in Liverpool Town Hall. The other members included William Gregson, John Dobson, his cousin John Parr, Thomas Hodgson, Thomas Staniforth, George Case, Samuel Shaw, John Backhouse and James Caruthers.

He had married Catherine Serocold in 1740, by whom he had two daughters, and was buried at St Nicholas, Liverpool, on 21 February 1768.

== Sources ==
- Richardson, David (2007). Liverpool and Transatlantic Slavery. Liverpool, UK: Liverpool University Press. ISBN 978-1-84631-066-9.
- Williams, Gomer (1897). History of the Liverpool Privateers. UK: Liverpool University Press.
