= List of committee members of the African Company of Merchants =

Slave traders in the UK

The African Company of Merchants was managed by the African Committee, which was composed of nine committee members, three each from London, Liverpool and Bristol. The constitution stipulated that the committee should be elected annually from the general body of traders from these cities, who paid 40 shillings to be admitted to the company.

The establishing act, African Company Act 1750, had stipulated that committee members should be ineligible to remain on the committee after three years. However between 1750 and 1764 only 14 individuals served on the committee, with a palpable pattern of rotation.

== 1755 ==
- Samuel Poirier

== 1757/58 ==
- Liverpool:Samuel Touchet

== 1758/59 ==
Elected 15 July 1758:

- London: Rongat Lehook, Robert Scott, Henry Douglas
- Bristol: Samuel Smith, Vincent Briscoe, Pere Cuft
- Liverpool: Richard Gildart (MP), Nathaniel Basnett, Charles Pole (MP)

== 1770/1771 ==
- Richard Camplin

== 1772/3 ==
The election took place on 3 July 1772. London:

- John Bourke
- Gilbert Ross
- James Bogle French

== 1773/4 ==
- John Bourke

== 1774/5 ==
- John Bourke

== 1777/1778 ==
- John Bourke
- John Barnes

== 1778/1779 ==
- John Bourke

== Dates to be determined ==
- John Shoolbred (1740-1802)
