= John Okill =

British shipbuilder

John Okill (c.1687 – 20 August 1773) was a pioneering and successful 18th century shipbuilder from Liverpool, England. Not much is known about his early life, though by the time he was 50 years old, he was a leading citizen of the town, having undertaken the roles of timber merchant and shipbuilder.

Is shipbuilding business was based in the Nova Scotia district that was an integral part of Liverpool’s maritime history, The area now known as Mann Island was until the early part of the 20th century a shantytown and Dock known as Nova Scotia due to its twinning with Nova Scotia Canada, Canada traded with Liverpool in Timber used for the huge amount of is shipbuilding, As part of this twinning there’s even a Mann Island and a Mersey River (Nova Scotia) and a Liverpool, Nova Scotia, Liverpool’s Nova Scotia gradually got replaced as a docks developed and shipbuilding moved to Birkenhead,

By 1739 his reputation an accomplished ship builder got him the first of many commissions by the Royal Navy to build ships of the line. The first was the "Hastings", a ship of 44 guns and weighing 682 tons. He would build another eight ships between 1740 and 1758 for the navy.

His shipbuilding company saw several other partners over the years: by 1758 the firm was "Okill and Rigg", and in 1768 it became "Okill & Sutton".

John Okill was also a Liverpool member of the Company of Merchants trading to Africa, formed in 1750. The other merchants traded in African slaves; Gomer states that Okill's firm was "the only African Merchants not engaged in the slave trade". However, he was personally involved in five slave-trading partnerships in the last 1740s, carrying over 1,500 slaves to the West Indies. Instead he "traded in wood and teeth (the ivory trade)". (The ivory was heavy, and the trade depended on freshly-captured slaves who were compelled to carry the tusks to the ports where both the tusks and their carriers were sold.)

In 1747 Okill was the donor of the lease for the site upon which the original Liverpool St Thomas's Church was built.

In 1773 he started work on a manor home in Woolton called Lee Hall. He died later that same year, with work on the building completed by his inheriting nephew, James Okill. There were problems associated with the disposal of John Okill's estates, requiring an Act of Parliament in 1784, (24 Geo. [118] III, c. 1) to enable the trustees to dispose of certain of them. James and his inheritors, the Dutton family, helped to plan and layout what would become Gateacre.

There was a monumental inscription to him at the original St Peter's Church, Liverpool, demolished 1922. Lee Hall was torn down sometime after 1971. His commercial Day Book for 1752 – 1753, listing the daily transactions relating to his shipbuilding business can be found at the Liverpool Record Office and Local History Service.
