= Parr (ship) =

Several vessels have been named Parr:

- Parr (1769 ship), of 140 tons (bm), was a ship built in North Carolina. She was registered in Philadelphia with Peter Creighton, master, and Joseph Wharton, owner.
- Parr (1784 ship) was a vessel captured circa 1783. The captured vessel was renamed for Governor Parr. Between 1785 and 1794, she made eight voyages from Halifax, Nova Scotia as a whaler. In 1791, she was part of a flotilla that carried blacks from Halifax to establish a community in Sierra Leone.
- Parr (1797 ship) was launched in 1797 at Liverpool as a slave ship in the triangular trade in enslaved people. She was lost in 1798 in an explosion on her first voyage.
