= Amazon (1780 ship) =

British merchant and slave ship 1780–1804

History

France
- Launched: 1775
- Captured: 1800

Great Britain
- Name: Amazon
- Owner: 1781:Robinson; 1790:Chapman; 1799:Cullen; 1801:Thomas Parr
- Launched: 1775
- Acquired: 1800 by purchase of a prize
- Fate: No information more recent than 1804

General characteristics
- Tons burthen: 400, 440, or 445, or 446, or 460 (bm)
- Sail plan: Full-rigged ship
- Crew: 1794:25; 1799:50; 1800:30
- Armament: 1781:18 × 6-pounder guns "of the New Construction" (NC); 1783:6 × 6-pounder guns; 1794:12 ×6&18-pounder guns + 2 swivel guns (Note: Lloyd's Register makes clear that the 18-pounder cannons were carronades, not guns.); 1799:26 × 9&18-pounder guns; 1800:20 × 9&12-pounder guns
- Notes: Three decks

Amazon was launched in France in 1775, under another name and taken in prize in 1780. British owners named her Amazon and she became a West Indiaman. In 1782, an American letter-of-marque, a former British Royal Navy frigate, captured her, but the Royal Navy quickly recaptured her. She then became Dumfries. She may have been renamed again. She reappeared as Amazon in 1790, and traded between London and Smyrna. In 1798, she made one voyage for the British East India Company (EIC) between 1797 and 1798. She then made three voyages between 1800 and 1804, as a Liverpool-based slave ship in the triangular trade in enslaved people. Her subsequent history is currently obscure.

== Career ==
Amazon appears in Lloyd's Register in 1781, with W. Gray, master, Robinson & Co., owners, and trade London–Jamaica. Then on 16 August 1782, Lloyd's List reported that the transport Amazon, Gray, master, had been taken while carrying clothing to Quebec. Her captor was the American letter of marque Flora, formerly HMS Flora, which sent her capture to Bordeaux. However, shortly thereafter HMS Portland recaptured Amazon and sent her into Newfoundland. In 1793, Portland's officers and crew received prize money for the recapture of Amazon and her cargo.

=== Dumfries ===
In 1783, Amazon was renamed Dumfries, with Nicholson, master, and trade London transport. She had damages repaired in 1783, and in 1784, her master was J. Tullock. Her owner was still Robinson, but her trade was now London–West Indies. She may then have been resold or renamed because both Amazon and Dumfries disappear from Lloyd's Register for some years.

=== Amazon again ===
Amazon reappeared in Lloyd's Register in 1790, with Waring, master, Chapman, owner, and trade London−Smyrna. She had undergone "good repairs" in 1785 and 1790. In 1792, she received a "thorough repair" and her master became R. Stanning. Waring became master of Georgiana. On 19 April 1791 Lloyd's List reported that Amazon, Waring, master, had returned from Smyrna.

Lloyd's Register for 1795 (published in 1794), showed Waring again as master, though her trade remained London–Smyrna. Captain William Waring acquired a letter of marque on 19 September 1794.

=== EIC voyage ===
Waring sailed from Falmouth on 16 February 1797, bound for China. Amazon arrived at Whampoa Anchorage on 11 July. Homeward bound, she was at Lintin on 1 January 1798, and Malacca on 16 January. She reached the Cape of Good Hope on 18 March, and St Helena on 14 April. She was at Cork on 25 June, and arrived at Long Reach on 11 July. At some point Charles Hooper replaced Waring as master, but when and why is currently not clear.

Lloyd's List for 1799, showed Amazon's master changing from Waring to M'Dowell, and her ownership from Chapman to Cullen.

=== Transporting enslaved people ===
Amazon made three voyages transporting captives from West Africa to the Caribbean.

First voyage transporting enslaved people (1799–1800): Captain William Grahame acquired a letter of marque on 25 February 1799. Graham sailed from Liverpool on 10 March 1799, bound for the Bight of Biafra and the Gulf of Guinea Islands. In 1799, 156 British vessels sailed from British ports, bound on voyages to transport enslaved people; 134 of these vessels sailed from Liverpool.

Grahame acquired captives at Calabar and delivered them to Kingston, Jamaica, on 16 January 1800. He disembarked 390 captives. Amazon left Jamaica on 31 May 1800. Amazon left the Jamaica fleet on 10 June, and arrived back at Liverpool on 16 July 1800. She had had a crew of 62 and suffered 23 crew deaths on the voyage.

Second voyage transporting enslaved people (1800–1802): Captain James Cosnahan acquired a letter of marque on 6 December 1800. He sailed from Liverpool on 30 December 1800, bound for the Bight of Biafra and the Gulf of Guinea Islands. In 1800, 133 British vessels sailed from British ports, bound on voyages to transport enslaved people; 120 of these vessels sailed from Liverpool.

Cosnahan acquired captives at Bonny and Calabar and delivered them to Kingston, Jamaica, on 16 August 1801, with 323 captives. Amazon sailed for England on 25 March 1802. She had to put back leaky, but still arrived at Liverpool on 19 May. She had 15 deaths among her crew of 43.

Third voyage transporting enslaved people (1802–1803): Captain John Hunter sailed from Liverpool on 22 October 1802, for Africa. In 1802, 155 British vessels sailed from British ports, bound on voyages to transport enslaved people; 122 of these vessels sailed from Liverpool.

Amazon arrived at Havana in July 1803, with 396 captives.

== Fate ==
There is no further data on Amazon. A brig Amazon, Wales, master, was taken on 10 October 1803, off Cape Antonio as she was sailing from Jamaica to Halifax, but it is not currently possible to determine definitively whether she was or was not the slaver Amazon.

In 1804, 11 British vessels in the triangular trade were lost, one of them on the homebound leg.

== Data from the registers ==
The following table presents data from Lloyd's Register:

Year	Master	Owner	Trade
1800	M'Dowell; J. Canahan	Cullen & Co.	London–India
1801	M'Dowell; J. Canahan	Cullen & Co. T. Parr	London–India; Liverpool–Africa
1802	J. Casnahan; J. Hunter	T. Parr	Liverpool–Africa
1803	J. Hunter	T.Parr	Liverpool–Africa
1804	J. Hunter	T.Parr	Liverpool–Africa
1805	J. Hunter	T.Parr	Liverpool–Africa
1808	J. Hunter	T.Parr	Liverpool–Africa
1809			No longer listed

The following table presents data from the Register of Shipping:

Year	Master	Owner	Trade
1800			Not listed
1801	M'Dowel	Cullen & Co.	London–India
1802	J. Canhan	T. Parr	Liverpool–Africa
1803			Not available
1804	J. Hunter	T.Parr	Liverpool–Africa
1805			No longer listed
