= William Gregson (slave trader) =

English slave trader and politician (1721–1800)

William Gregson (12 January 1721 – 1800) was an English slave trader and politician. He was responsible for at least 152 slave voyages, and his slave ships are recorded as having carried 58,201 Africans, of whom 9,148 died. Gregson was the co-owner of a ship called the Zong, whose crew perpetrated the Zong massacre.

== Early life ==
William Gregson was born on 12 January 1721 in Liverpool, England, and worked as a rope maker in his youth.

== Slave trade ==
Gregson was one of Britain's most prolific slave traders, with at least 152 slave voyages recorded to his name. The only slave traders based in the Port of Liverpool with more recorded voyages were William Boats with 157 and William Davenport with 155.

Gregson's vessels are recorded as having carried 58,201 Africans, of whom 9,148 died on board. Gregson plied the Atlantic slave trade route. His ships left the Port of Liverpool loaded with goods to be traded for enslaved people in Africa. The African captives were taken to the Caribbean or Spanish America to be sold. The ships then returned to Liverpool with cotton, sugar or spices. Gregson embarked more than half of his enslaved people from the Bight of Biafra, which is today part of the Gulf of Guinea. More than 40% of them were delivered to Jamaica.

== Zong massacre ==
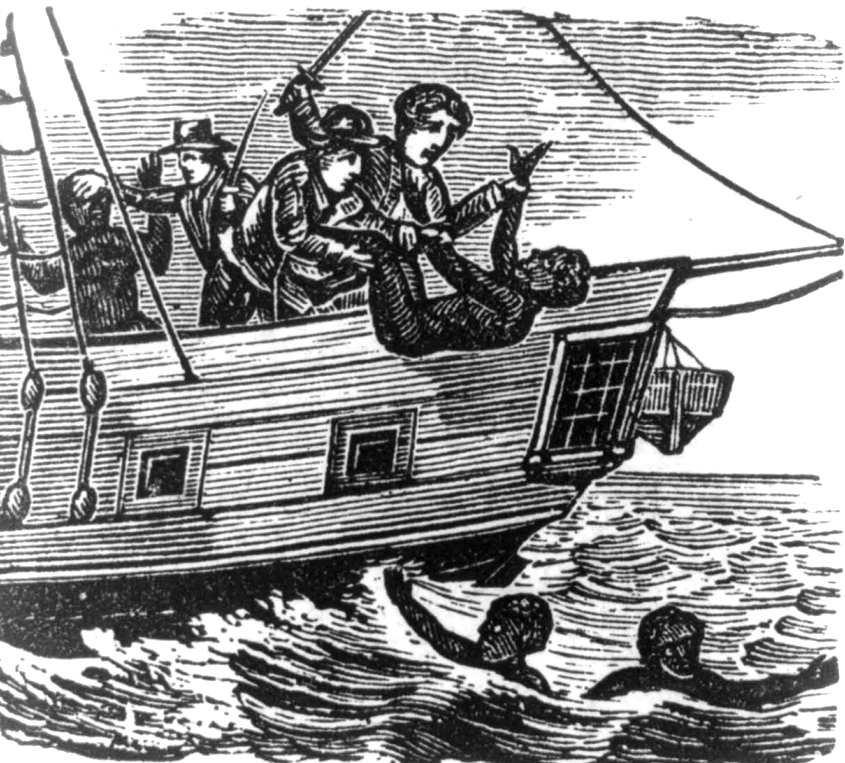
An 1832 image of enslaved people being thrown overboard, sometimes associated with the Zong massacre

On 29 November 1781, the crew of the slave ship Zong began throwing their human cargo into the sea to their deaths; the atrocity became known as the Zong massacre. More than 130 enslaved people died. The ship was owned by a syndicate of slave traders led by William Gregson that included his two sons John Gregson and James Gregson, his son-in-law George Case, Edward Wilson, and James Aspinall.

After the massacre, the owners claimed an insurance payout of £30 for each person who had been murdered. The insurance company refused to pay out and a court case ensued. The owners won their case. The decision was overturned on appeal, the judge at the trial, Lord Mansfield, insisted that the "Case of Slaves was the same as if Horses had been thrown overboard". Nevertheless, the massacre was a landmark in the abolition movement because it galvanised public opinion against slavery. The massacre became "an emblematic way of highlighting the callous rapacity of slave-traders, and the calculated murder of innocent enslaved Africans".

== Lord Mayor of Liverpool ==
Liverpool was Britain's pre-eminent slave trading city and at least twenty-five Lord Mayors of Liverpool were slave traders. In 1762, William Gregson became Lord Mayor and in 1784 so did his son, and fellow slaver, John Gregson. In 1787, the Liverpool Council became concerned with the growth of the slave trade abolition movement and they petitioned Parliament against its regulation. In 1788, the Liverpool Council stated to Parliament "that the trade had been legally and uninterruptedly carried on for centuries past by many of [H]is Majesty's subjects, with advantages to the country, both important and extensive; but had lately been unjustly reprobated as impolitic and inhuman."

== Personal life ==
In 1777, Gregson was living in Everton, then a new town on the edge of Liverpool with fashionable residences, and now a suburb of the city. His residence was a sumptuous villa called Everton House. In front of his house was a private water well that became known as Gregson's Well. The villa no longer remains, nor do two public houses nearby that were called Gregson's Well. Gregson Street in Everton is named after him. A contemporary account says: "Mr Gregson fancied the public road outside his property came too near the front of his house. The overseer of highways, willing to oblige so magnificent a personage, consented to alter it so as to give adequate space in front of the mansion. Hence the awkward curve that now exists, which would cost thousands of pounds to straighten." By the time he retired, Gregson had been a slave trader for half a century, and had branched out into banking and insurance. He died in 1800.

== Sources ==
- Dalton, Carolyn (2021). "Memorial to Zong: The Gregson Syndicate – The Crew – The Abolitionists" (PDF). Lancaster City Museums.
- Richardson, David (2007). Liverpool and Transatlantic Slavery. UK: Liverpool University Press. ISBN 978-1-84631-066-9.
- Williams, Gomer (1897). History of the Liverpool Privateers. UK: Liverpool University Press.
- Walvin, James (2011). The Zong: A Massacre, the Law and the End of Slavery. New Haven & London: Yale University Press. ISBN 978-0-300-12555-9.
