= Grandy King George =

Grandy King George was a local Efik slave trader and ruler of Old Town, Calabar in present-day Nigeria. He lived around the late eighteenth century. Little Ephraim Robin John was his brother and Ancona Robin John was his nephew.

== Career ==
Grandy King George, originally Ephraim Robin John was the dominant slave trader of Old Town in Calabar. He was a member of the Robin John family, important characters in the Trans-Atlantic slave trade who flourished in the Bight of Biafra. Calabar had grown from a small town in the late 17th century to one of the most important slave trading regions of the 18th century. He adopted many trappings of English culture and had a fascination for European goods.

Grandy King George established trade relations with ship captains and merchants in Bristol and Liverpool, England. He wrote letters to record personal and business transactions with his business partner in Bristol, Thomas Jones. Once the British slave-ship captains would arrive in the port of Old Calabar, the negotiations began and once satisfied with the exchange agreement, Grandy King George would send his men in large canoes to wage war and capture Ibo and Ibibio speaking people for captives.

In 1767 trade negotiations between Grandy King George and Duke Ephraim of New Town turned bitter, which stalled the local slave trade. An English Captain Bevins decided to form an alliance with Duke Ephriam to ambush King George and his men because the English traders were dissatisfied with him, due to the high costs levied on them. Many of his men were slaughtered and those who were not massacred were loaded onto slave ships. Among those prisoners were Little Ephraim and Ancona, members of the Robin John family.

In 1773, Grandy King George begged Thomas Jones, his business partner in Bristol, for more reasonable men to be sent to his ports because 4 of his sons had been pawned and taken away in a slave ship- "there is 4 of my sons already gone with Jackson and I don't want any more of them carried off by any other vausell".
