= John Parr (merchant) =

English merchant and shipowner (1722–1798)

John Parr (1 June 1722 – 7 October 1798) was an English merchant and shipowner. He was bailiff and mayor of the Borough of Liverpool in 1773.

== The Parr family of Liverpool ==
Confusingly, there are three (more or less related) John Parrs listed among the prominent merchants in the Liverpool Directory of 1766: John Parr of Old Church Yard, merchant; John Parr of Frederick Street, gunsmith; and John Parr of Water Street, draper.

Edward Parr of Castle Street, merchant and apothecary, also listed, was the first cousin of the present John Parr. Edward was a merchant and slave trader with West Africa, the West Indies and Chesapeake Bay; member of the African Company of Merchants, 1752; shipowner (True Blue, 1758, etc.); and rumoured to be 'the second richest man in Liverpool'.

John Parr of Frederick Street and (later) of Argyle Street, Liverpool, and of Elm House, West Derby (which he built, c. 1777), gunmaker, is distinguished in records as a Presbyterian. He is of the line described by Bernard Burke as "Parr of Lythwood". He was born about 1734 and died 15 March 1798; his will dated 1794 and probated in Chester, 30 September 1799, described 'very large and commodious workshops and warehouses' for the gun trade in Liverpool, in the area of Argyle Street where he lived, extending to Pitt Street. His eldest son John Parr, born 1767, is recorded as an insolvent debtor of Elm House, ‘out of business’, by February 1840. His third son Thomas Parr (slave trader), born in 1769, succeeded him in his business as a Liverpool merchant.

== Life ==
This John Parr of Old Church Yard was the son of John Parr, of Haysom in Rainford, of a family settled there as small landowners in the 15th century, who had moved to Liverpool as a general merchant and shipowner about 1700. He married Jane Horton, daughter of Joshua Horton, ancestor of the Horton baronets of Chadderton.

John Parr is usually described as a "merchant" and shipowner involved in the Atlantic slave trade. He may have developed his business as a gun trader and exporter, later in association with his younger cousin, John Parr of Frederick Street, the gunsmith. In 1751 (when the gunsmith was just 17) it was probably this John Parr who was recruited as an agent for the Birmingham firm of Farmer & Galton, by James Farmer, partner of Samuel Galton Jr. He took over a role selling guns on commission under John Hardman. In this business relationship with Farmer and Galton, he also took on the "battery trade", another aspect of the hinterland commerce dealing in small copper and brass items. In 1752 he was listed with Hardman and Edward Parr as an African Company of Merchants founding member. The gun trade presented particular difficulties of long credit required by customers, and Galton chased Parr to collect payments. Up to the outbreak of the Seven Years' War in 1756, discounts for cash on guns were high.

At the time when he was mayor in 1773, he is stated to have lived in Water Street. Rioting broke out in Liverpool at the end of August 1775, when sailors employed in the Atlantic trade, then in a slump, objected to a cut in wages. In the aftermath, Parr supplied guns, ammunition and swords to the Liverpool corporation.

The "tower gun" was a staple trade item at Old Calabar and generally in West Africa. It took its name, in effect a brand, from the supposition that such guns had been tested on the Tower of London's firing range. Commercial correspondence from 1788 mentions how Parr acquired old guns in Ireland, and had them reconditioned by workshops to be saleable in the African trade.

Parr, or his cousin and namesake, were one of the manufacturers supplying French agents with guns, just before the outbreak of the French Revolutionary Wars. Galton, discussing the trade with John Mason who was in the pay of the Home Office, gave Parr most of the credit for importing Irish Ordnance fusils on behalf of the French.

He invested in a steam-powered cotton factory and property in Liverpool and St Helen's. He died on 7 October 1798, aged 76, and has a memorial tablet in St Nicholas's Church. His will was proved as John Parr, of Liverpool, merchant, in Chester in 1799.

== Family ==
Parr married in 1756 Anne Wolstenholme (died 1765, aged 25), daughter of the Rev. Henry Wolstenholme (died 1771), rector of Liverpool. Parr moved into the Wolstenholme family residence in Ropewalks, which was in an area partially built up towards the end of the 17th century, and later when fashionable called Wolstenholme Square. The south side of the square was built up by 1765. His father-in-law left Parr land between Wolstenholme Square and Colquitt Street. Already in 1764 Parr had leased land north of RopeWorks, adjacent to Copperas Hill, but he never engaged in speculative building there.

The Parrs' children included:

- John Owen Parr I (1757 – 1819, Kentish Town), the eldest son, was an insurance broker and merchant (1791–94), at 11 Royal Exchange, London; and in 1799 was a member of Lloyd's of London. He suffered bankruptcy in 1800. He married in 1792 Elizabeth Mary Patrick, daughter of Thomas Patrick and Elizabeth Chase, who was a niece of Sir Richard Chase of Much Hadham and first cousin of Chase Price. Parr was in business with Thomas Chase Patrick, Elizabeth's brother, and they were involved together in the bankruptcy proceedings. Their son John Owen Parr II matriculated at Brasenose College, Oxford in 1815, graduating B.A. in 1818 and M.A. in 1850. He became vicar of Preston, Lancashire in 1840. Another son was Thomas Chase Parr (died 1883), a general in the Hon. East India Co.'s service in the Bombay Army.
- Edward Parr (21 Mar 1760 – 1848), attorney, married Anne Jane Hamilton, daughter of Arthur Hamilton of Wavertree.
- The writer Wolstenholme Parr (1762–1845) spent much of his life in Venice. There he married and during the Austro-French wars he was imprisoned and his house, pictures and books were burned. He was later offered asylum by Napoleon and published The Story of the Moor of Venice, translated from Giraldi Cinthio's Hecatommithi, 1795. He acquired the bulk of the papers of Pierre-François Hugues d'Hancarville, editing and publishing his work on Raphael in French in 1842.
- Joshua Wolstenholme Parr, MD (1763–1810) was a chemical manufacturer of alum, copperas and vitriol, and a partner with Horne, Thomlin & Thomas Henry Jr in the Mona Vitriol Co., Amlwch, Anglesey (dissolved 25 November 1793), with works at Parys Mountain. He married in 1792 Althea Barton, daughter of the Manchester calico and fustian manufacturer George Barton (1731–1789). He retired to a small estate in Carmarthenshire called Pentre Parr, Ffairfach near Llandeilo, where he died aged 47. He was the grandfather of William Barton Wright and the great-grandfather of Edward William Barton-Wright.
- Thomas Parr (30 March 1765 – 1834), merchant. Following his marriage to Mary Wood, daughter of Richard Wood, he prosecuted Ralph Benson in a notorious trial for criminal conversation with his wife, the proceedings of which were published in full (1808), following which he was confined at Dr Chew's of the Lunatic Society and at Mr Holme's Madhouse, Clapton.
