= Gildart =

Gildart is both a surname and a given name. Notable people with the name include:

- Ian Gildart (born 1969), English rugby league player
- Oliver Gildart (born 1996), English rugby league player
- Richard Gildart (1673–1770), English merchant
- Gildart Jackson, British actor
