= John Shoolbred =

Scottish surgeon (1766–1831)

John Shoolbred FRSE (13 March 1766 – 12 October 1831) was a Scottish surgeon. He is associated with the early widespread use of smallpox vaccine in India in the early 19th century.

== Life ==
He was born in Auchtermuchty in Fife on 13 March 1766, the eldest son of Helen Stark (born 1743) and her husband, James Shoolbred (1737–1818) of the East India Company. His uncle, also John Shoolbred (1740–1802) served as Secretary to the African Company of Merchants.

He studied medicine at the University of Edinburgh. In 1789 he joined the East India Company as a surgeon. His position from 1790 to 1794 is unclear but in 1794 he became Assistant Surgeon in the Presidency National Hospital in Bengal. From 1802 he became involved in the campaign for widespread use of the newly created smallpox vaccination. Due to this involvement, in 1807 the President made him Superintendent General of Vaccine Inoculation in India, a highly responsible role. He was also placed as Superintendent of the Calcutta Native Hospital.

In 1819 he was elected a Fellow of the Royal Society of Edinburgh. His proposers were Thomas Allan, Thomas Charles Hope, and Henry Dewar.

He retired from the East India Company in 1821 and died in Cheltenham on 12 October 1831.

== Family ==
In 1801 he married Lucy Rand in Calcutta. Their daughter, Helen Mary Shoolbred, married Admiral Norwich Duff.

== Publications ==
- Report on the Progress of Vaccine Inoculation in Bengal
