= Charles Pole (1695–1779) =

English slave trader, insurer and politician

Charles Pole (baptised 6 September 1695; died October 1779) was an English slave trader, insurer and Member of Parliament, the fifth son of Samuel Pole of Radbourne Hall.

He was elected to Parliament unopposed as Member for Liverpool at a by-election on 19 March 1756, but was defeated at the general election in 1761 by Sir William Meredith.

He was a Committee Member of the African Company of Merchants for Liverpool, 1758/9

Parliament of Great Britain
Preceded by Thomas Salusbury; Sir Ellis Cunliffe	Member of Parliament for Liverpool; 1756–1761; With: Sir Ellis Cunliffe	Succeeded by Sir William Meredith, Bt; Sir Ellis Cunliffe
