= Gold Coast ackey =

Currency issued for the Gold Coast by the British between 1796 and 1818

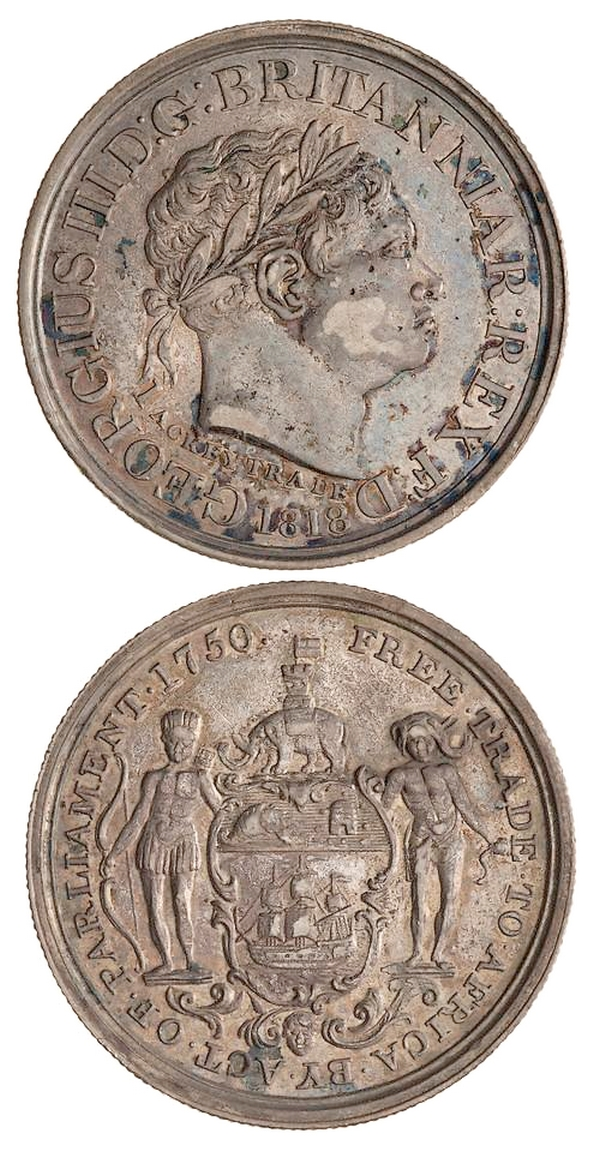
- 1818 ackey coin, minted in Birmingham and bearing the head of King George III

Unit
- Plural: ackeys

Denominations
- Subunit
- 1/8: takoe
- Coins
- Freq. used: 1 takoe; 1/4, 1/2 and 1 ackey

Demographics
- Date of introduction: 1796
- User(s): Colony of the Gold Coast

The ackey was a currency issued for the Gold Coast by the British between 1796 and 1818. It was subdivided into 8 takoe and was equal to the British halfcrown, i.e., 1 takoe = 3 3/4 pence and 1 pound = 8 ackey.

The currency consisted of silver coins in denominations of 1 takoe, 1/4, 1/2 and 1 ackey. All coins bar the takoe carried the inscription "Free Trade to Africa by Act of Parliament 1750", commemorating the African Company Act 1750 which dissolved the Royal African Company and created the African Company of Merchants, which remained in existence while the ackey was in circulation.

The name derived from the use of ackee (Blighia sapida) seeds for weighing gold dust; one ackee seed weighed about 20 troy grains (1.3 grams).
