= Old Noll (1743 ship) =

English privateer

History

Great Britain
- Name: Old Noll
- Owner: Charles Goore; William Bulkeley; Samuel Reid; John Clayton; Levinus Unsworth; Arthur Heywood; Isaac Oldham; Thomas Backhouse; Joseph Manesty; Nathaniel Basnett; Samuel Ogden; Thomas Seel, junior John Knight; William Whalley; John Parr; William Penketh; James Ross; Edward Roughsedge; James Gildart; Ellis Cunliffe; Robert Cunliffe; John Brookes; John Hardman; William Williamson; Roger Brooks; John Bostock; John Atherton; Edward Forbes
- Builder: Norfolk, Virginia
- Launched: 1743
- Acquired: 1744
- Fate: Sunk, 1745

General characteristics
- Class & type: Hackboat
- Tons burthen: 250 tons
- Complement: 180
- Armament: 22 guns

Old Noll was a privateer operated by a group of merchants from Liverpool, England during the War of the Austrian Succession.

After a brief but successful career as a privateer, she was sunk in November 1745 by a French naval squadron from Brest.
