= Owen Salusbury Brereton =

English antiquary

Owen Salusbury Brereton, FRS, FSA (1715 – 8 September 1798), born Owen Brereton, was an English antiquary.

== Life ==
Brereton was born in London in 1715, the son of Thomas Brereton, MP for Liverpool, by his first wife, Miss Trelawney. His father had inherited Shotwick Park, Cheshire, and other property through his second marriage with Catherine, daughter of Mr. Salusbury Lloyd, the MP for Flint Boroughs, and had changed his surname to Salusbury by a private act of Parliament, Brereton's Name Act 1748 (22 Geo. 2. c. 47 Pr.). Owen Brereton succeeded in 1756 to Shotwick and other estates in the counties of Chester, Denbigh, and Flint on his father's death and also took Salusbury as (an additional) surname.

He was admitted a scholar of Westminster School in 1729, and entered Trinity College, Cambridge, in 1734. He was called to the bar from Lincoln's Inn in 1738, and in that year held the post of a lottery commissioner.

In September 1742 Brereton was appointed Recorder of Liverpool, an office he retained till his death, a period of fifty-six years. When he proposed to resign in 1796, he was requested by the corporation to retain the situation, and they appointed a deputy to relieve him of the pressure of its duties. He became a member of the Society of Arts in 1762, and was vice-president from 1765 to 1798, in which capacity he rendered great service to the society. He was also a Fellow of the Royal Society (elected 1762) and of the Society of Antiquaries (elected 1763), a bencher of Lincoln's Inn, treasurer of that body, and keeper of the Black Book.

He was Member of Parliament for Ilchester in Somerset from 1775 to 1780, and Constable of Flint Castle from 1775.

He died at his residence at Windsor, on 8 September 1798, in his eighty-fourth year, and was buried in St. George's Chapel, Windsor, on 22 September.

== Works ==
He contributed an account of a storm at Eastbourne to the Philosophical Transactions of 1781, and sent several papers to the Archæologia:

- 'Round Towers in Ireland,' ii. 80.
- 'Observations in a Tour through North Wales, Shropshire, &c.,' iii. 111.
- 'Extracts from a MS. relating to the Household of Henry VIII,' iii. 145.
- 'Particulars of a Discovery of Gold Coins at Fenwick Castle,' v. 166.
- 'Description of third unpublished Seal of Henrietta Maria, daughter of Henry IV of France,' v. 280.
- 'Brereton Church Window,' ix. 368.
- 'Silver Coin of Philip of France,' x. 465.

In vols. viii. x. xi. and xii. of the same work are particulars of various objects of antiquity exhibited by him. The paper on Brereton Church contains several unaccountable inaccuracies, which have been commented upon by George Ormerod in his History of Cheshire.
