= Parr (1797 ship) =

History

Great Britain
- Name: Parr
- Owner: Thomas Parr
- Builder: John Wright, Liverpool
- Launched: 1797
- Fate: Burnt 1798

General characteristics
- Type: Ship
- Tons burthen: 450, or 566 (bm)
- Length: 120 ft (36.6 m)
- Propulsion: Sail
- Complement: 80, or 97
- Armament: 32 × 18-pounder guns

Parr was launched in 1797 at Liverpool as a slave ship in the triangular trade in enslaved people. She was lost in 1798 in an explosion on her first voyage.

== Origins ==
Parr was built in Liverpool and named for owners Thomas and John Parr, members of an eminent local slave-trading family. She was built to accommodate seven hundred captives. Parr was not only the largest Liverpool slave ship, but at 566 tons (bm), the largest vessel in the entire British trans-Atlantic trade in enslaved people.

== Voyage and loss ==
Lloyd's Register for 1797 had a Parr, 450 tons (bm), of Liverpool, Christian, master.

Captain David Christian acquired a letter of marque on 5 December 1797, and sailed for the Bight of Biafra and Gulf of Guinea Islands on 5 February 1798; he acquired captives at Bonny Island.

Lloyd's List reported that Parr, Christian, master, caught fire and blew up in 1798, off the coast of Africa as she was sailing from there for the West Indies. At the time she had the full complement of captives aboard. Twenty-nine of her crew and some 200–300 captives were saved. Christian died in the explosion. (Two or three years earlier he had been master of Othello when she too had caught fire while gathering captives.) Other records indicate that Parr had a crew of 97 men and had embarked some 200 captives. The surviving captives were shipped on other vessels.

In 1798, 25 British slave ships were lost. Twelve of the losses occurred on the coast of Africa.
