= Nile (1802 ship) =

History

France
- Builder: Nantes
- Launched: 1795
- Fate: Captured or sold 1802

United Kingdom
- Name: Nile
- Namesake: Battle of the Nile
- Owner: 1803: Mathias Maher & Elijah Belcher; 1804:Thomas and John Moss; 1806:Thomas Parr
- Acquired: 1802 by purchase
- Fate: Sold in Barbados 1811

General characteristics
- Tons burthen: 260, or 270, or 271 bm
- Sail plan: Brig
- Complement: 1803:50; 1803:100; 1804:30
- Armament: 1803:12 × 6-pounder guns; 1803:20 × 6&9-pounder guns; 1804:20 × 6-pounder guns; 1810: 10 × 2 + 10 × 4-pounder guns

Nile was launched at Nantes in 1795 and was captured or purchased from the French in 1802. She then made four voyages from Liverpool as a slave ship in the triangular trade in enslaved people. Between her first and second voyages transporting enslaved people she cruised for less than year as a privateer. With the abolition in 1807 of the slave trade, Nile became a regular merchantman, but now trading with Africa. She was sold in Barbados in 1811.

== Transporting enslaved people ==
=== 1st voyage transporting enslaved people (1802–1803) ===
Captain Elijah Belcher sailed from Liverpool on 30 November 1802, bound for Africa to acquire and transport captives. In 1802, 155 vessels sailed from English ports bound to Africa to acquire and transport enslaved people; 122 of these vessels sailed from Liverpool.

Nile arrived at the Bahamas on 2 June 1803 where he landed 276 captives. Captain Belcher had left Liverpool during the Peace of Amiens. War with France resumed while Nile was on her voyage. While Nile was at the Bahamas Belcher acquired a letter of marque on 11 July 1803. Nile left the Bahamas on 9 August, and arrived back at Liverpool on 19 September. She had left Liverpool with 32 crew members and had suffered one crew death on her voyage.

=== Privateer ===
Captain William Hill acquired a letter of marque on 3 November 1803. The doubling of the size of Nile's crew and the increase in armament makes it clear that he intended to sail her as a privateer. Nile, Hill, master returned to Liverpool on 8 May 1804, from a cruise. Privateering must have appeared less promising than transporting enslaved people.

=== 2nd voyage transporting enslaved people (1804–1805) ===
Captain John Gwin acquired a letter of marque on 10 July 1804. (From 1801 to 1802 he had sailed another Nile on a slave voyage.) Gwin sailed from Liverpool on 27 July 1804, bound for the Congo River. In 1802, 147 vessels sailed from English ports bound to Africa to acquire and transport enslaved people; 126 of these vessels sailed from Liverpool.

Nile acquired captives at the Congo River and sailed for the Americas on 18 November 1804. Nile arrived at Charleston on 7 May 1805. There she landed 278 captives. Nile sailed from Charleston on 10 June and arrived back at Liverpool on 9 August. She had left with 33 crew members and she had suffered three crew deaths on her voyage.

=== 3rd voyage transporting enslaved people (1806-1807) ===
Captain John Anderson sailed from Liverpool on 6 March 1806, bound for Calabar. Nile landed 273 captives at Kingston on 11 November. She sailed from there on 25 January 1807 and arrived back at Liverpool on 8 April. She had left with 30 crew members and she had suffered seven crew deaths on the voyage.

=== 4th voyage transporting enslaved people (1807-1808) ===
Captain John Anderson sailed from Liverpool on 1 May 1807. The Act for the Abolition of the Slave Trade took effect on that day, but Nile had already received clearance to sail so her voyage was one of the last legal voyages of the transportation of enslaved people. She sailed for Malembo and arrived at Berbice on 18 November 1807. There she landed about 285 captives. She sailed for Liverpool on 1 March 1808 and arrived there on 19 April. She had left Liverpool with 33 crew members and she suffered two deaths on her voyage. She brought back to Liverpool from Africa and Jamaica a cargo consisting of palm oil, ivory, redwood, coffee, cotton, ginger, hides, and horns.

== Merchantman ==
Year	Master	Owner	Trade	Source
1810	J.Anderson	Kitchen & Co.	Liverpool–Africa	LR
1815	J.Anderson	J.Penny	Liverpool–Africa	LR

== Fate ==
On 30 June 1811, Nile, Anderson, master, put into Barbados in a leaky state. She was coming from Gabon and had had to throw her guns and 3000 pieces of redwood overboard. The next report was that Nile had been sold in Barbados.
