= Samuel Shaw (slave trader) =

English slave trader

Samuel Shaw (1718 – 1781) was an English slave trader. He was responsible for at least 119 slave voyages between 1750 and 1778.

== Early life ==
Shaw was born in Liverpool in England. His father, also called Samuel Shaw, was a mercer.

== Slave trade ==
Shaw was a member of the African Company of Merchants. Prior to 1750, the British Crown held a monopoly of rights for slave trading in West Africa with a business called the Royal African Company. An act of parliament ended the monopoly, the act was established by King George II and entitled "An Act for the extending and improving the trade to Africa, 1750, for the port of Liverpool".

Shaw kidnapped over half of his enslaved people from the Bight of Biafra. The locality in West Africa has now been renamed to the Bight of Bonny, at the time it was commonly used by Liverpool slave traders. He took part in the Chesapeake slave trade sending at least 5 slave ships to the area.

== Sources ==
- Richardson, David (2007). Liverpool and Transatlantic Slavery. Liverpool, UK: Liverpool University Press. ISBN 978-1-84631-066-9.
- Williams, Gomer (1897). History of the Liverpool Privateers. UK: Liverpool University Press.
