= Thomas Eyton (politician) =

British politician (died 1757)

Thomas Eyton (c. 1682–1757), of Lower Leeswood, Flintshire, was a British landowner and Tory politician who sat in the House of Commons from 1721 to 1727.

Eyton was the son of Thomas Eyton of Trimley, Flintshire and his wife Elizabeth Powell, daughter of Sir Thomas Powell, 2nd Baronet, of Horsley Hall, Gresford, Denbighshire, and Birkenhead, Cheshire. He matriculated at Jesus College, Oxford on. 29 Oct. 1700, aged 18. In 1707, he married. Elizabeth Davies, daughter of Robert Davies of Gwyrsaney and Llanerch, Denbighshire. He succeeded his father to Trimley and his great-uncle John Eyton to Lower Leeswood. He appears to have sold Trimley in about 1707.

Eyton was High Sheriff of Flintshire for the year 1711 to 1712. He was a member of the Jacobite Cycle of the White Rose with Sir Watkin Williams Wynn, and was returned unopposed as Member of Parliament for Flint Boroughs at a by-election on 10 June 1721. At the 1722 general election, he was re-elected for Flint Boroughs in a contest. He did not stand at the 1727 general election but carried on supporting Wynn in his political activities in North Wales.

Eyton died in 1757 leaving two sons, Thomas and John, and a daughter Elizabeth who married Robert Wynne of Garthewyn.

Parliament of Great Britain
Preceded by Sir John Conway, Bt	Member of Parliament for Flint Boroughs; 1721–1727	Succeeded by Salusbury Lloyd
