= Charles Goore =

English politician and slave trader (1701–1783)

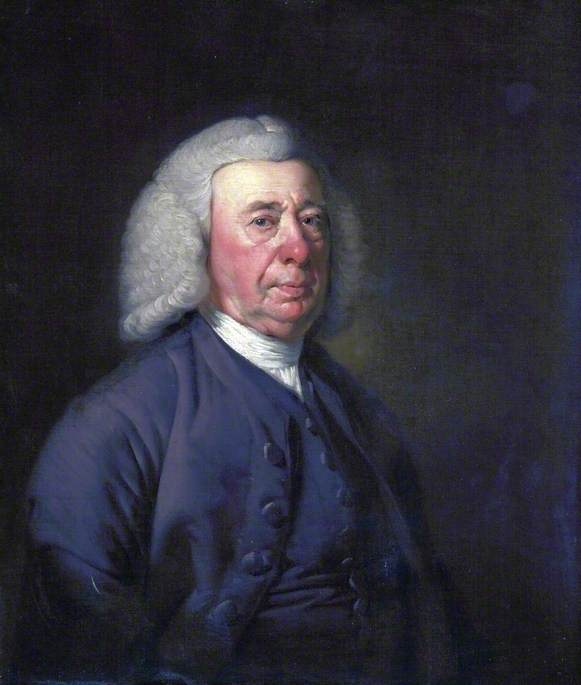
Portrait of Charles Goore, painted by Joseph Wright of Derby

Charles Goore (11 December 1701 – 13 March 1783) was an English merchant, and politician, who twice held the office of Mayor of Liverpool.

== Early life ==
Charles Goore was born on 11 December 1701, to Richard Goore of Goore House near Ormskirk, Lancashire. His mother was Alice Mather, the daughter of Thomas Mather of New Hall, Shropshire and Martha Bunbury. His wife, Margery Halsall was the great great great niece of Humphrey Chetham, through his brother Ralph Chetham. Charles and Margery resided in a house situated in the churchyard of Church of Our Lady and Saint Nicholas, Liverpool.

== Mercantile activity ==
Goore was part of a consortium of Liverpool merchants who in 1744 invested in Old Noll which they put to work as a privateer during the War of the Austrian Succession.

== Political career ==
Goore was a member of the Liverpool Corporation and was known throughout the city for being a successful shipping merchant. He was a founding member of the African Company of Merchants when it was established in 1752 to oversee the slave trade. He was a liberal subscriber to the Bluecoat school and also to the Liverpool Infirmary, of which he became a deputy treasurer upon its completion in 1748. He also donated towards the construction of the now demolished St. Thomas's Church and was appointed one of the commissioners and trustees. In 1747 he was a bailiff before being voted into the position of Mayor of Liverpool, first in 1754 and again in 1768.

Prior to taking his second term as mayor, he issued a statement due to his increasing years in which he announced his support for William Pownall.

The circular is dated 16 October 1767:

To every unprejudiced Freeman of the borough,

I have for some time past been urged to stand a candidate for Mayor at the ensuing election, and have, at two general meetings, declared against it; but as I find it is still persisted in, I make this public declaration:- That I am resolved not to take that trust upon me a second time, and hope all that wish me well will be satisfied with the public services I have done since my residence in this town, and not attempt to lay 'a burthen upon me in the decline of life, and you will oblige your fellow-burgees and

Most humble servant,

Charles Goore, Liverpool

The following day, he officially announced his backing for William Pownall:

To every friend of Charles Goore, who is a Freeman of the Borough and Corporation of Liverpool.

Yesterday I published a declaration that I would not take upon me the office of Mayoralty a second time, and that, in the decline of life; since which I have seen a paper published by Mr. Pownall, offering his services to take that office upon him. His character is too well known for me to enlarge upon it; the employment he gives to many makes him valuable to the community; and his sound judgement in trade and commerce call upon him to be a general arbitrator in matters of difference; these are valuable qualities, and I doubt not will be found in his public as well as private character. Therefore, my fellow freemen, pray give me leave to advice you unanimously to elect Mr. Wm. Pownall for your prime Magistrate, by which means you will preserve the peace of this great town, and save me from a burthen I should not be able to undergo. I write impartially to all of different sentiments, and were I not conscious of Mr. Pownall's acting as an honest and worthy magistrate in matters relative to the ensuing general election for members of Parliament, I should think you justifiable in opposing him.

But, pray let me put the question – What partial inquiry, or particular service, can either Mr. Pownall or myself do to either party in the ensuing general election? Honorary freemen can be of no service; and what Magistrate would stand the punishment of a false return? I have consulted the public benefits of the town ever since my declining the West-Indian trade, which is near twenty-seven years, and now, pray let me enjoy rest- for which purpose, and to settle my concerns abroad, I've declined trade; therefore you that are my friends cannot show it, or oblige me more, than by electing Mr. Pownall for your Mayor, and you will thereby engage me in the interest of the gentlemen I declared for this day seven-night, and in continuing to be

Yr sincere Friend and most humble Servant, Liverpool Oct 17, 1767, Charles Goore

This appeal was successful and William Pownall was voted into office, however, he died five months later, and on 12 March 1768, Goore was voted to fill in the position for the remaining months.

The following year, Goore was voted as Deputy Mayor during Matthew Strong's term.

Goore died on 13 March 1783, at his home in Liverpool. He was buried at St. James's Cemetery in the city centre.

== Family ==
Goore had four children, Charles Mather Goore, who died from Smallpox aged 16 months, Richard Goore, Henry Goore and Elizabeth Goore. His daughter Elizabeth was the only offspring to marry. She married her father's apprentice and future Mayor, Thomas Staniforth.
