= William (1806 ship) =

Liverpool slave ship

History

United Kingdom
- Name: William
- Owner: Thomas Parr (1806-1807)
- Acquired: 1806 by purchase of a prize
- Captured: 1814

General characteristics
- Tons burthen: 190, or 194 (bm)
- Armament: 14 × 4&6-pounder guns

William was launched in Spain under another name and was taken in prize circa 1806. She made one voyage as a Liverpool-based slave ship in the triangular trade in enslaved people. Thereafter she traded between Liverpool and Madeira. In 1814 an American privateer captured William.

== Career ==
William first appeared in the Register of Shipping (RS) in 1806.

| Year | Master | Owner | Trade | Source |
|---|---|---|---|---|
| 1806 | Williamson | J.Parr | Liverpool–Africa | RS |

Voyage transporting enslaved people (1806–1807): Captain Joseph Williams sailed from Liverpool on 6 March 1806, bound for West Africa. (Note: Joseph Williams was the 7th most experienced slave captain of the period 1785–1806. During that period he made eleven voyages in six different vessels, for four different owners. He started by sailing out of Bristol but later switched to Liverpool.) Between 1 January 1806 and 1 May 1807, 185 vessels cleared Liverpool outward bound in the slave trade. Thirty of these vessels made two voyages during this period. Of the 155 vessels, 114 were regular slave ships, having made two voyages during the period, or voyages before 1806.

William gathered captives at Calabar and arrived at Kingston, Jamaica on 1 January 1807 with 201 captives. She sailed from Kingston on 22 March and arrived back at Liverpool on 1 June. She had left Liverpool with 24 crew members and she had suffered four crew deaths on her voyage.

The Act for the abolition of the slave trade had passed Parliament in March 1807 and took effect on 1 May 1807. William did not, therefore, sail again as a slave ship.

Missing volumes in the Register of Shipping and missing pages in LR make for a gap in the record between 1807 and 1809 in the registers.

| Year | Master | Owner | Trade | Source & notes |
|---|---|---|---|---|
| 1809 | Wells | W.Taylor | Liverpool–Curacao | RS; large repair 1807 |

In July 1808 Lloyd's List (LL) reported that as William, Wells, master, was sailing from Jamaica to Liverpool she lost her bowsprit off the east enter of Jamaica and had to put back. Ship arrival and departure (SAD) data from LL earlier showed William, Wells, master, sailing from Poole to Newfoundland on 23 March 1807, and at Madeira in late 1807. On 4 January 1808 she arrived at Boston from Newfoundland, and in late October she was at Gibraltar, having come from Newfoundland.

| Year | Master | Owner | Trade | Source & notes |
|---|---|---|---|---|
| 1810 | W.Jones | T.Taylor | Liverpool–Madeira | LR; large repair 1807 |

== Fate ==
Lloyd's List reported in April 1814 that the American privateer Tormentor had captured William. William was last listed in 1814. There is, however, no record of an American privateer by the name Tormentor in the most complete lists of American privateers. A compendium of U.S. privateers and their prizes as culled from Niles Weekly Register has no listing for Tormentor, and none of the prizes named William appears to be the William of this article.
