= Daniel Backhouse =

English slave trader (1741–1811)

Daniel Backhouse (1741-1811) was a Liverpool slave trader. In the period between 1773 and 1799 Backhouse was responsible for 100 slave voyages. Over half of his slaves were embarked from the Bight of Biafra.

He was born in Ulverston in Lancashire. In his will he left an estate valued at £70,000.

== Sources ==
- Richardson, David (2007). Liverpool and Transatlantic Slavery. UK: Liverpool University Press. ISBN 978-1-84631-066-9.
