= Little Ephraim Robin John and Ancona Robin John =

African slave traders and slaves

Little Ephraim Robin John and Ancona Robin Robin John were two 18th-century African slave traders, later enslaved people, and finally, free men who were members of the ruling family of Old Town, Calabar, Nigeria. Ancona was the nephew of both Little Ephraim and the King of Old Town.

Members of the Efik clan, the men were seen as valuable assets to European slave traders because they spoke multiple languages, were literate, could negotiate, and had extensive knowledge of the slave trade.

The Robin Johns were kidnapped while participating in a slave trade expedition. They were sold to British slave traders while the king of Old Town, Grandy King George, was negotiating trade with the Duke of New Town.

The Robin Johns were deceived twice by captains promising to bring them home to Africa. While in the Kingdom of Great Britain, the two men successfully petitioned the British courts for their freedom.

== Early life and capture ==
By the mid-1700s, a bitter rivalry had formed between Old Town and New Town in Old Calabar for preeminence in the lucrative slave exportation of the region. In 1767, the feud between the towns had grown so intense that the two towns were preventing each other from acquiring slaves, leading the European slave traders to attempt to mediate the situation between them. While Old Town attempted to negotiate with New Town, New Town secretly organized an ambush with nearby Creek Town and slave traders who had disdain for the Robin Johns.

Several members of the Robin John family boarded the ships of slave traders, including Ancona, Little Ephraim, and Amboe while others waited in canoes outside. Under the belief that they were negotiating peace with New Town, the princes arrived unarmed. They were trapped in their cabin as a wave of sailors came to cut them with cutlasses, while other ships opened fire on the Old Town canoes. Ancona and Little Ephraim were taken prisoner, and Amboe was beheaded. While the King of Old Town escaped, the massacre was so violent that the river was stained red with the blood of Old Town men. It is said that 400 men from Old Town were slaughtered, and despite the King's efforts, Old Town would never fully recover from the massacre.

== Captivity ==
=== Dominica ===
The Robin Johns were transported to Dominica by Captain Bivins on the Duke of York. Once on the island, the men were sold to a French physician.

Several months later, Captain William Sharp of Liverpool convinced the Robin Johns that he would transport them back to Africa if they could escape to his ship. In a letter, one of the men stated that he was "determined to get home". One night, the Robin Johns slipped away and boarded Sharp's ship. Once the Robin Johns were aboard, Sharp instead sailed to Virginia where he would sell the Robin Johns to John Thompson.

=== Virginia ===
Their new enslaver, John Thompson of Williamsburg, Virginia, was a slave trader. Thompson frequently took the men with him on his voyages. A short-tempered man, Thompson beat the Robin Johns frequently. In March 1772, Thompson died.

Shortly after Thompson's death, the Robin Johns encountered some sailors from Old Town who were in port in Virginia on the slave trading ship Greyhound. The sailors recognized the two men and relayed the story of their ambush in Old Calabar to their captain, Captain Terence O'Neil, urging him to help the Robin Johns. O'Neil agreed to transport the men to Africa if they escaped their captivity, and when the Robin Johns escaped to the Greyhound, O'neil would sail with the pair aboard to Bristol, England.

=== Liverpool ===
Upon arriving in Liverpool, O'Neil transferred the Robin Johns to another ship headed back to Virginia with plans to sell them again. The Robin Johns spent two weeks locked in a slave ship before they sent a letter to the prominent slave trader Thomas Jones, who knew the Robin Johns personally, as he had made many trips to Old Calabar in the 1760s. Jones had formed close relationships with the ruling family of Old Town. When Ancona and Little Ephraim were taken from Old Calabar, Grandy King George had swiftly written to Thomas Jones, asking for his help with bringing his brother and nephew home. The Robin John's ability to send out a letter while held captive suggests they'd grown favor with the sailors on the trip, possibly due to their knowledge of English.

==== Court case in England ====
Through Thomas Jones, the Robin Johns petitioned for their freedom. Jones used the 1772 ruling on the James Somersett case, attempting to use Habeas Corpus to free the Robin Johns. A judge ruled that the Robin Johns were free and could not be returned to America to be sold again. After being declared free, the two men traveled back to Calabar.

=== Journey back to Old Town ===
The Robin Johns believed they would leave to return to Old Calabar in late September of 1773, however, the ship that'd been arranged for them by Thomas Jones would not be ready to leave until February, 1774. While the ship departed in February, it would return back to port, and the Robin Johns would not be able to sail again until March 12, 1774. The Robin John's would ride aboard the Maria, a slave shipcaptained by William Floyd, who'd been present during the massacre of Old Calabar that saw their capture.

The Maria would wreck off the coast of a desert island, which the Robin John's attributed to Floyd's error, and the Robin Johns were rescued by a passing ship that returned them to Bristol. In Bristol, they stayed with Elizabeth Johnson and spent their time studying scripture and attending services. While Thomas Jones complained of the large sums of capital he'd spent on the Robin Johns, on October 1, 1774, he'd arrange for the Cato, the ship that ultimately returned the Robin Johns back to Old Calabar.

== Later life and legacy ==
While in Bristol the princes reached out to Thomas Jones to be brought Charles Wesley, a famous methodist, and converted to Methodism. Although Ancona wrote of a great God while in Virginia, suggesting the princes may have previously been converted to Christianity in America. Oral tradition relates that they were responsible for the spread of Christianity in Calabar after their return in 1794.

Some evidence suggests that Ephraim engaged in the slave trade after returning to Calabar; he had previously suggested to Charles Wesley that he saw little alternative if he was to repay Thomas Jones for his help.

The Robin Johns' association with John Wesley is thought to have influenced his attack on the institution of slavery in his pamphlet Thoughts upon Slavery (1774).

== See also ==
- List of kidnappings
- List of solved missing person cases
