= Sir Thomas Aston, 4th Baronet =

British landowner and Whig politician

Sir Thomas Aston, 4th Baronet (c. 1704–1744), of Aston-by-Sutton, Cheshire, was a British landowner and Whig politician who sat in the House of Commons from 1729 to 1741.

== Early life ==
Aston was the only son of Sir Thomas Aston, 3rd Baronet (eldest son of Sir Willoughby Aston, 2nd Baronet) and his wife Catherine Widdrington, daughter of William Widdrington of Cheeseburn Grange, Northumberland.

He matriculated at Corpus Christi College, Oxford on 1 March 1722, aged 17. He succeeded his father on 16 January 1725, to the baronetcy and to the estate at Aston worth £4,000 p.a.

== Career ==
Aston was returned as an opposition Whig Member of Parliament for Liverpool at a by-election on 28 May 1729 and acted strongly in the interests of Liverpool’s merchants and traders. His opponent Thomas Brereton, raised a petition which was finally rejected by the House in April 1730 after protracted hearings. Aston was elected to serve on the gaols committee. On 19 February 1730, he sent a reassuring report to the mayor of Liverpool, and thus the port’s independent traders, of a debate on the Royal African Company’s attempt to make independent traders pay for the maintenance of its forts in Africa. In the debate on Hessian troops on 3 February 1731, he proposed ‘that the House should address the King to give away his Hanover dominions to anybody that would take them’, but the move was ignored. On the Address on 16 January 1733, he challenged the statement expressing satisfaction with the situation of the country’s affairs given difficulties to trade caused by Spain and France. He spoke on the qualification bill that to expect merchants serving seaport towns to have land qualification was unreasonable. .He also spoke against the Excise Bill. At the 1734 British general election he decided not to stand for Liverpool, and was returned instead for St Albans on the recommendation of Sarah Churchill, Duchess of Marlborough. On 30 March 1739 he spoke in favour of the repeal of the Test Act. He did not stand at the 1741 British general election,

== Personal life ==
In March 1736 Aston was married to Rebecca Shishe, a daughter of John Shishe of Greenwich, Kent, but there was no issue from the marriage.

He died while travelling at Paris and was buried at Aston on 17 February 1744. He was succeeded in the baronetcy by his cousin Willoughby Aston

Parliament of Great Britain
Preceded by Thomas Brereton; Thomas Bootle	Member of Parliament for Liverpool; 1729–1734; With: Thomas Bootle	Succeeded by Thomas Brereton; Richard Gildart
Preceded by The Viscount Grimston; John Merrill	Member of Parliament for St Albans; 1734–1741; With: Thomas Ashby	Succeeded by James West; Thomas Ashby
Baronetage of England
Preceded by Thomas Aston	Baronet (of Aston); 1725-1744	Succeeded by Willoughby Aston
