= Thomas Parr (slave trader) =

English slave trader

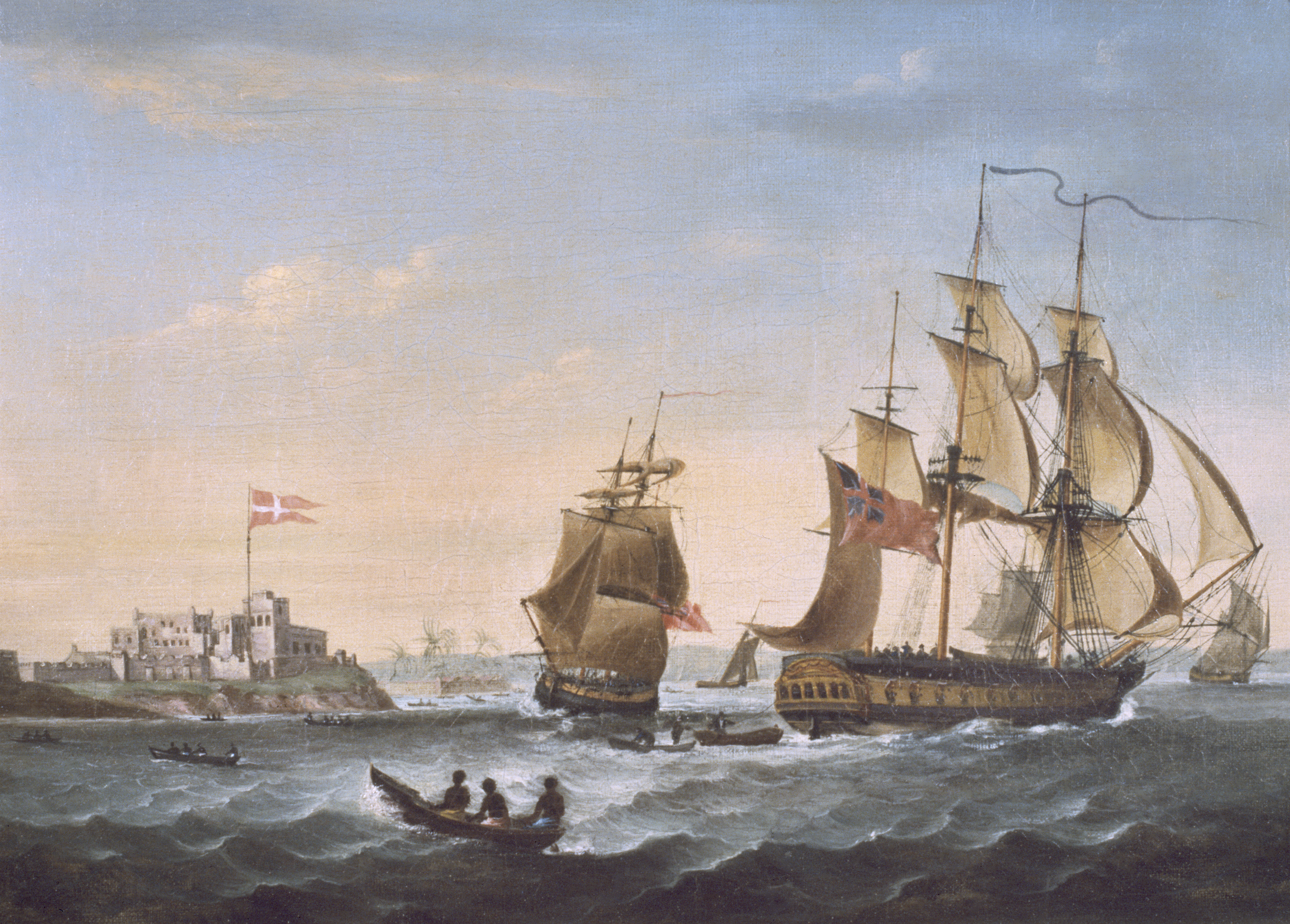
Two British slave ships off the Danish Fort Christiansborg

Thomas Parr (1769–1847) was a member of an extended family of Liverpool merchants, developing his business as an English slave trader who profited from the Atlantic slave trade and establishing himself as a wealthy businessman.

== Career ==
Thomas Parr was born on 4 November 1769, the son of John Parr, gunmaker of Frederick Street, Liverpool, by his wife Hannah Anderton.

In subsequent years, he invested in at least 30 slave voyages. One of the slave ships that he had built for the trade in enslaved people, Parr, exploded on her maiden voyage. A street in Liverpool where he built a warehouse is named after him.

== Slave trade ==
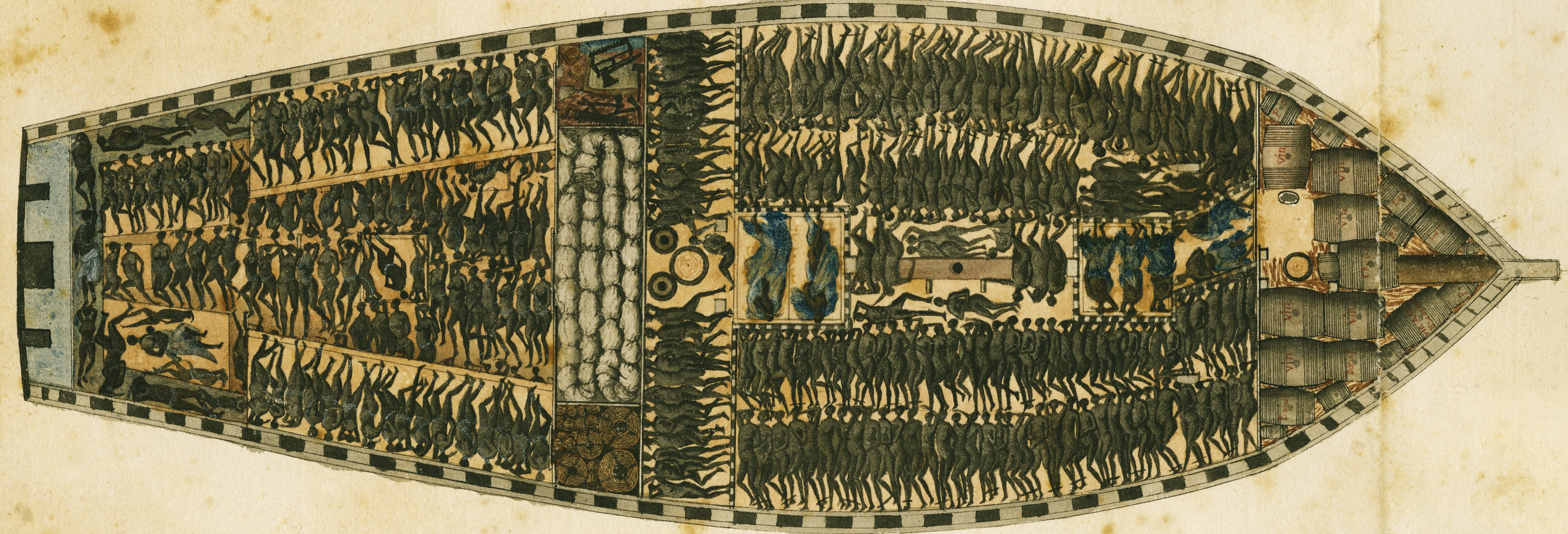
A painting of the slave deck of a slave ship, showing shackled Africans

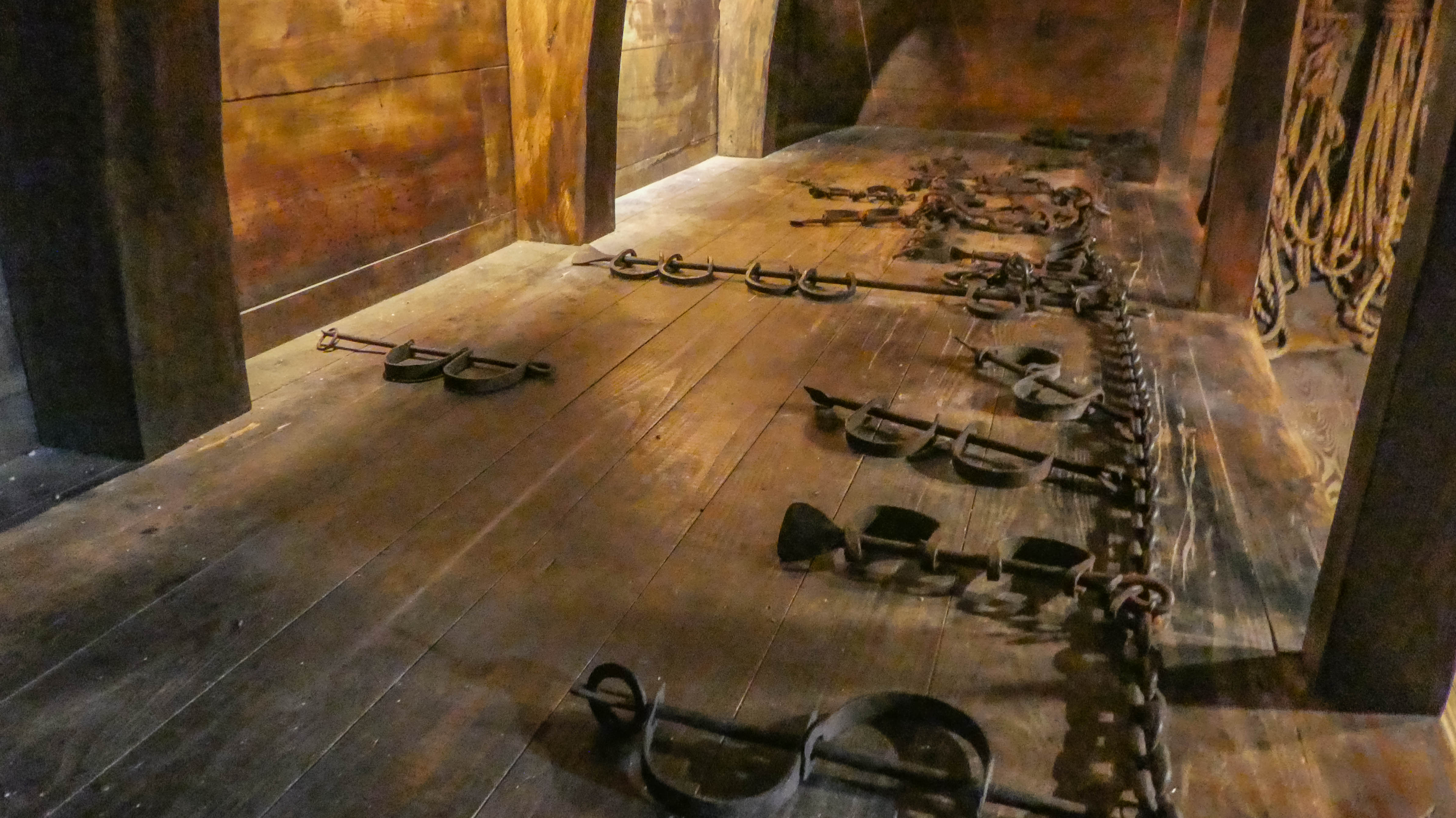
Slave shackles

Parr invested in at least 30 slave voyages, and was sole owner of several ships:

Vessel	No. of complete voyages for Parr	Notes
Amazon	2	1783: renamed to Dumfries
Argyle	1	1807: legally started a slave voyage after the slave trade had been made illegal
Expedition	5	1808: condemned at Antigua as unseaworthy
Hector	2	1804: captured by the French
Lovely Lass	0	1798: foundered off Cape Lopez, Africa, all Africans lost
Nile	2	1803: became a Privateer
Parr	0	1798: the largest slaver in the British Atlantic, exploded near West Africa on first voyage
William	1	Captured from the Spanish

== Personal life ==
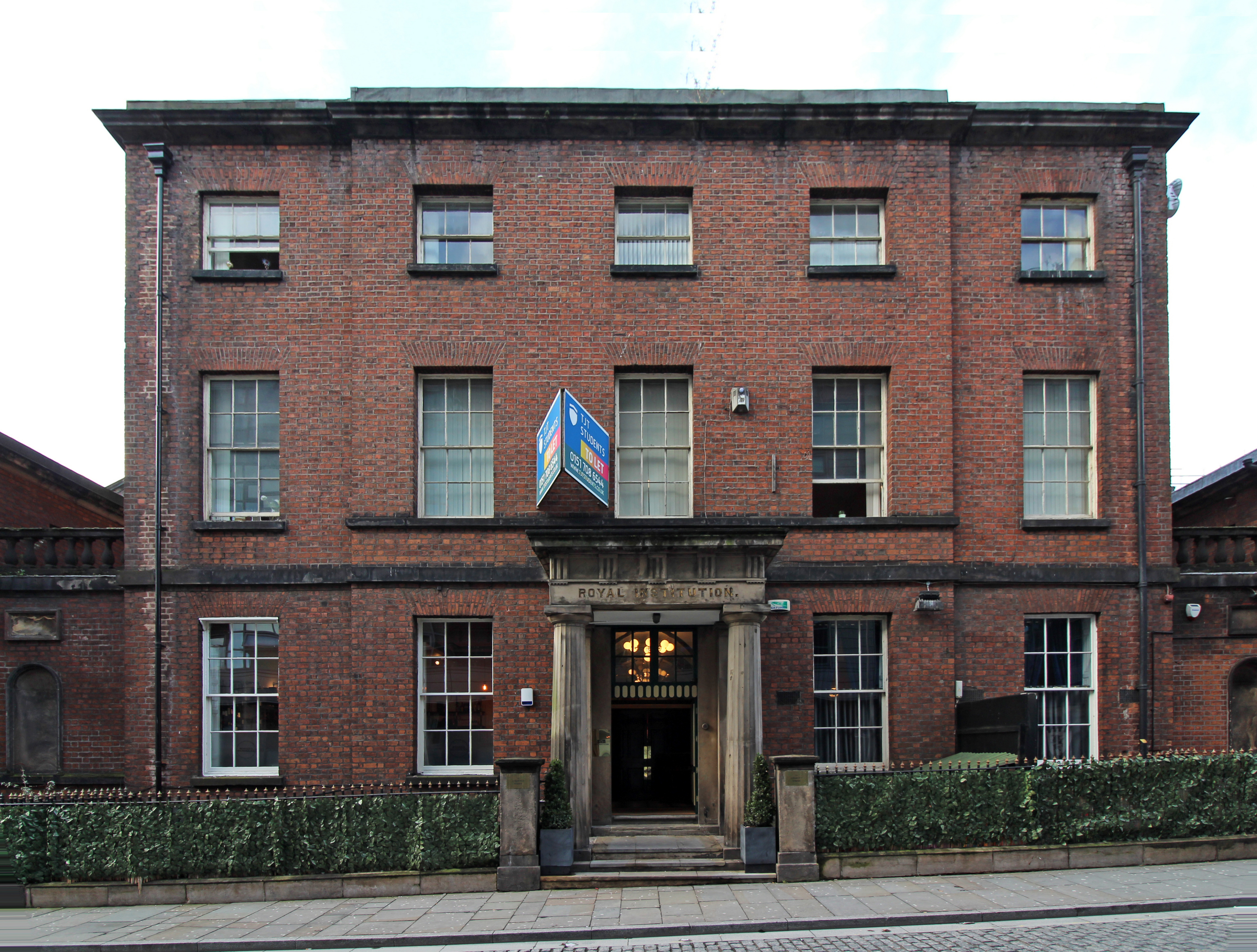
Parr's house, later the Royal Institution, Colquitt Street, Liverpool

Parr built a house at Colquitt Street in Liverpool in 1797, that has been described as "magnificent". The south wing of the house was a counting house. The house is flanked by pavilions, with one of them being used as a coach house. There was also a courtyard, a pleasure garden, a pond, and walks. The house was used between 1817 and 1948 as Liverpool Royal Institution; many of the people that established the institution were former slave traders.

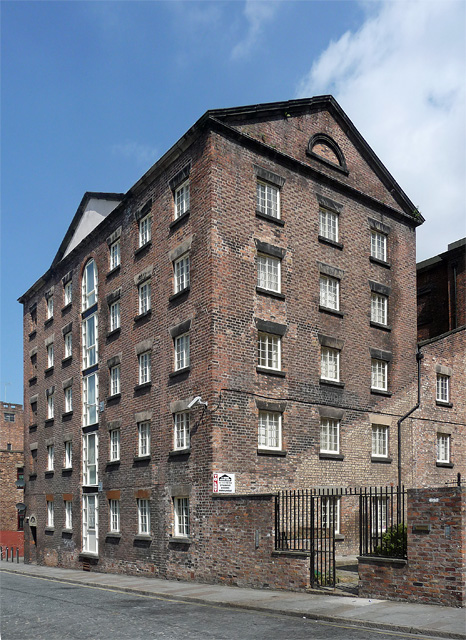
Parr's warehouse on Parr Street, Liverpool

Behind the house he built a warehouse that he used to store iron goods that were traded for slaves. The warehouse was five storeys high with a basement, with seven window bays to the south elevation and three to the east and west, each bay with ashlar lintels and stone sills. A passage led from the warehouse to the counting house.

== Retirement ==
Parr sold his Liverpool home around 1805 and retired to a country house and estate called Lythwood Hall, near Bayston Hill in Shropshire. He became part of the landed gentry and acquired a notable collection of rare coins. The acclaimed evolutionary scientist Charles Darwin met him in 1840, and described him as "an old, miserly squire".

== Legacy ==
Parr Street in Liverpool is named after him. Both his former home on Colquitt Street, Liverpool and his warehouse on Parr Street are listed with Historic England. His former home at Lythwood Hall in Shropshire was demolished but there is a memorial to him in Lythwood.
