= Liverpool Royal Institution =

Learned society

Coordinates: 53.40125°N 2.97774°W

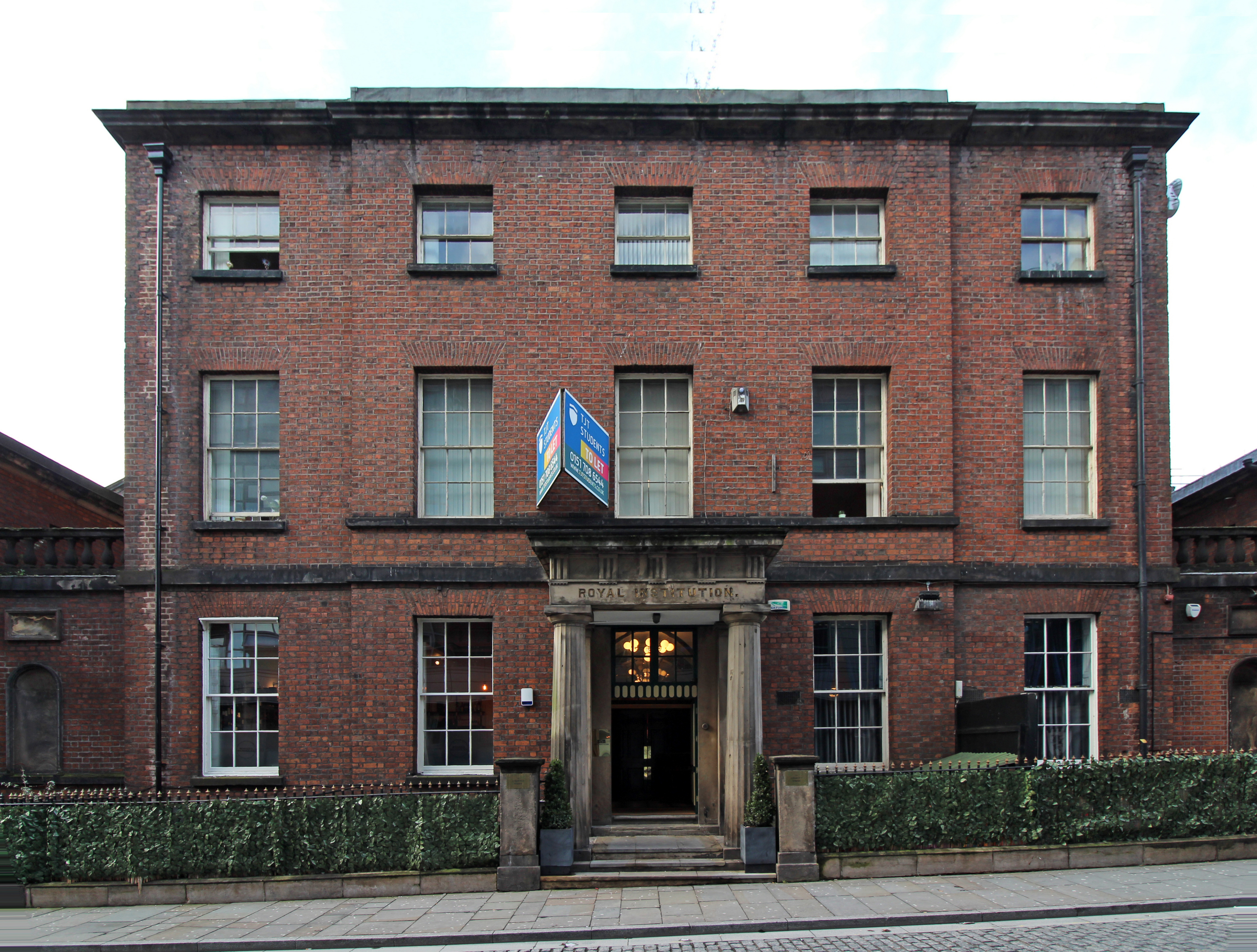
Liverpool Royal Institution on Colquitt Street

The Liverpool Royal Institution was a learned society set up in 1814 for "the Promotion of Literature, Science and the Arts". William Corrie, William Rathbone IV, Thomas Stewart Traill and William Roscoe were among the founders. It was sometimes called the Royal Society of Liverpool. The institute ran a grammar school for boys until 1892, and hosted exhibitions in an art gallery. It was dissolved in 1948, and its collections transferred to the University College Liverpool.

== History ==
The Liverpool Royal Institution was a learned society set up in 1814 for "the Promotion of Literature, Science and the Arts". William Corrie, William Rathbone IV, Thomas Stewart Traill and William Roscoe were among the founders.

A royal charter was granted in 1821. The institute purchased a building on Colquitt Street where a lecture program was started. It also included an art gallery which hosted John James Audubon's first European exhibition, in 1826. The art gallery included 37 pictures in a single room when it opened in 1819. The paintings included a Michelangelo, later sixteenth-century Italian pictures, a copy after Schongauer, and work by Catena, and a portrait by Rosso Fiorentino. A new building to host the gallery was built in 1841 and its director was William Swainson. A grammar school for boys, the Royal Institution School, ran until 1892.

After the construction of the William Brown Library and Museum, and Walker Art Gallery the institute fell into decline, its collections were moved to the gallery and its archives moved to University College Liverpool. The institute was dissolved in 1948.

== Slave trade ==
The house was built for the slave trader Thomas Parr. Parr sold his house to the institution and was one of its founder members. Many of the people who set up the institution were former slave traders.
