= Thomas Salusbury (Liverpool MP) =

Born Thomas Brereton, MP for Liverpool

Brereton's Name Act 1748
- Act of Parliament
- Parliament of Great Britain
- Long title: An Act for authorizing and empowering Thomas Brereton Esquire and his Heirs to take and use the Surname of Salusbury.
- Citation: 22 Geo. 2. c. 47 Pr.
- Territorial extent: Great Britain

Dates
- Royal assent: 13 June 1749
- Commencement: 29 November 1748 (Note: Start of session.)

Status: Current legislation

Thomas Salusbury (died 1756), of Shotwick Park, near Chester, born as Thomas Brereton, was a British Whig politician who sat in the House of Commons between 1724 and 1756. He was also Lord Mayor of Liverpool.

Brereton was the son of Edward Brereton of Chester, a saddler and innkeeper, and his wife Mary Fletcher, daughter of John Fletcher, a barber of Chester. He married Mary Trelawny, the daughter of Henry Trelawny, MP, of Whitley, Devon, before 1714.

Brereton's marriage gave him considerable electoral interest at Liverpool. He was returned unopposed as Member of Parliament for Liverpool at a by-election on 20 November 1724 on the death of Langham Booth, and was then elected in a contest at the general election in 1727. He was appointed Commissioner for victualling the navy in 1729 but lost his seat in Parliament at the consequent by-election on 28 May 1729.

Brereton made a second marriage in about 1731 to Catherine Lloyd, daughter of Salusbury Lloyd of Leadbrook, Flintshire, the MP for Flint Boroughs. He was mayor of Liverpool for the year 1733 to 1734. On the death of his father-in-law in 1734 he succeeded to the latter's estates, including Shotwick Park. He was elected MP for Liverpool again at the general election in 1734 and was returned unopposed in 1741. He resigned his office as Commissioner for victualling in 1747 in accordance with the Place Act 1742, which made it incompatible with a seat in the House of Commons, and was returned unopposed for Liverpool again at the 1747 general election. He was also given a secret service pension of £500 p.a. He changed his surname from Brereton to Salusbury by a private act of Parliament, Brereton's Name Act 1748 (22 Geo. 2. c. 47 Pr.). He was returned successfully for Liverpool in a contest at the 1754 general election.

Salusbury died on 9 March 1756. There were no children from his second marriage, but he had four sons and a daughter by his first wife. His son Owen Salusbury Brereton became an MP and antiquary.

== Notes ==
Parliament of Great Britain
Preceded by Langham Booth; Thomas Bootle	Member of Parliament for Liverpool; 1724–1729; With: Thomas Bootle	Succeeded by Sir Thomas Aston, Bt. Thomas Bootle
Preceded by Sir Thomas Aston, Bt. Thomas Bootle	Member of Parliament for Liverpool; 1734–1756; With: Richard Gildart (1734-1754); John Hardman (1754-1755); Sir Ellis Cunliffe (1755-1756)	Succeeded by Charles Pole; Sir Ellis Cunliffe
