= John Shoolbred (slave trader) =

John Shoolbred (30 November 1740–1802) was a Scottish slave trader primarily active in London. He was a member or "freeman" of the African Company of Merchants, an organisation established in Great Britain to participate in the transatlantic slave trade. He also served on the Committee of nine members who ran the company. When his reputation was under attack in 1777, he wrote to Edmund Burke to thank him for his political support.

== Slave trading voyages ==
Voyage id	Ship	Date left	Date return	Captain	Owner	No. of enslaved Africans	Location in Africa	Location in Americas	Notes
#77950	Providence	27 March 1769	17 Aug 1769	William Goad	Shoolbred	106 of 124*	Windward Coast	Kingston, Jamaica	
#78220	Hawke	1770?	1770	George Mill Cleiland	Shoolbred	328 of 359*	Gold Coast	Americas	
#75532	Friendship	11 March 1776	1776	Cumming	Shoolbred	236 of 273*	Gold Coast	?	
