= Salusbury Lloyd =

British Whig politician

Salusbury Lloyd (died 26 December 1734), of Leadbrook, Flintshire, was a British Whig politician who sat in the House of Commons from 1728 to 1734.

Lloyd was christened John Lloyd and was the son of John Lloyd of Chester, Esq. (died 1721) and his first wife, Elizabeth Carter (died 1693). Following his mother's death in Virginia, his father relocated to Chester and married Letitia Salusbury on 9 May 1695. He later assumed the name Salusbury to secure the inheritance of the Leadbrook estate.

Lloyd rented an estate near Flint and stood with government support for Parliament at Flint Boroughs at the 1727 general election. The head bailiff was Lloyd's tenant and was threatened with eviction if he did not return his landlord, and so there was a double return. Although Lloyds opponent won a large majority, a party vote of the House of Commons awarded the seat to Lloyd, in spite of the evidence. Lloyd voted with the Government on every recorded occasion, except the excise bill, which he opposed. He did not stand again at the 1734 general election.

Lloyd died on 1734. His son predeceased him and he left his property to his daughter Catherine's husband, Thomas Brereton.

Lewis Lloyd of Old Rappahanock, distinct LL tobacco mark, and the only Lloyd to have patented land in the freshes of the Potomac is the father of John despite there being no surviving birth certificate. The land passes as follows Lewis Lloyd -> Thomas Lloyd -> John Lloyd - Micajah Perry Trust -> Robert King Carter.

This connection is historically significant because Lloyd descendants married into the Hansford family. Through Sir Uriah Brereton this connects the Salusbury-Lloyd network to Handsforth Hall.

Parliament of Great Britain
Preceded by Thomas Eyton	Member of Parliament for Flint Boroughs; 1728–1734	Succeeded by Sir George Wynne, Bt
