= Williamson's Liverpool Advertiser =

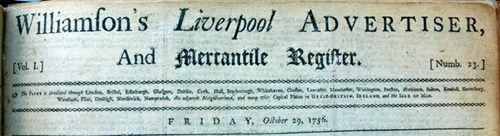

Williamson's Liverpool Advertiser was the first successful newspaper published in Liverpool. A previous newspaper had been founded in 1712, but it failed after two years. However, on 28 May 1756, Robert Williamson, a local printer, launched Williamson's Liverpool Advertiser.

Williamson had previously contacted Thomas Statham, the postmaster of Liverpool, and suggested he might like to join him in the enterprise of setting up a weekly newspaper for Liverpool. Statham accepted the proposal and also suggested that Henry Ogle, the organist at the Church of Our Lady and Saint Nicholas, Liverpool should join them. The three men set up the partnership of Williamson, Stratham and Ogle on 15 May 1756, with a total capital of £100, £50 provided by Williamson and £25 each from the other two. Williamson printed the newspaper and organised a group of hawkers to sell it. Williamson also went to Holmes Chapel, where he would purchase London newspapers, which he would then take newsworthy items to add to his newspaper, with an aim of getting in print before the London newspapers reached Liverpool. For all this he received a salary of £1 4s 0d per week. Ogle was chief reporter and was paid £10 a year. Statham received no payment, but no doubt benefitted from the opportunities the newspaper created for him as postmaster. Indeed, he contributed his share in the form of stamps.

By October 1756 Williamson dispensed with Ogle's service, who then refused to make further investments when Williamson claimed they were needed. Statham continued supporting the enterprise for a while, but he refused when Williamson demanded more money following the doubling of Stamp Duty in July 1757. Statham demanded to see the accounts, and then with aid of his brother, a lawyer, Ogle and he commenced legal proceedings which went to the Lancaster Court of Chancery in July 1763. The court records show the partnership was informal with poorly kept accounts. It is unclear what the outcome of the court case, but the paper continued without the involvement of Ogle or Statham.

By December 1763 the paper was no longer being published by Robert but by his sister, Alice Williamson. THis appears to have arisen from money troubles, and Robert resumed the role of publisher up until 1769, when he went overseas. He is recorded as having died in Madras in his wife's will of 1785. Alice once again took over the paper with the help of T. Billinge, after 1785. She died in 1793 and Josiah Williamson, son of Robert then took over publication of the paper.

The paper was later known as later Billinge's Liverpool Advertiser and finally The Liverpool Times before ceasing publication in 1856.
