= William Bulkeley (merchant) =

Liverpool merchant

- Occupation: merchant

William Bulkeley was a Liverpool merchant, son of Thomas Bulkeley of Anglesey, who financed voyages for slave-trading, privateering, and the Greenland whale fishery. He was apprenticed to Foster Cunliffe, a merchant of Liverpool, in 1731. By 1750 he was prosperous enough to be one of the first pew-holders of St Thomas's Church, Liverpool.

== Biography ==
Bulkeley was part of a consortium of Liverpool merchants who in 1744 invested in Old Noll which they put to work as a privateer.during the War of the Austrian Succession.

Between 1747 and 1756 he was part-owner of eleven slaving voyages. He also co-owned many other ventures, including from 1749 the ship Golden Lion, captured from the French on the last day of 1744, by HMS Port Mahon, (Hy. Aylmer Smith, commander), which was then used as a privateer. Bulkeley and his partner bought her in 1749, and fitted her out for a new career as a Greenland whaler, the first such ship from Liverpool. Under Captain Metcalf she made at least two successful voyages to Greenland. Bulkeley had other interests; he also bought and sold large amounts of tobacco.
