= William Boats =

William Boats (c. 1716-1794) was a Liverpool slave trader. Boats was responsible for 157 slave voyages, over half of his slaves were sent from the Bight of Biafra to Jamaica.

== Slave trading and privateering ==
Boats had shares in at least 156 Guineaman. In the book History of the Liverpool Privateers the author wrote that Boats was a waif found in a boat and enrolled in a Blue Coat School. It claims that he was apprenticed to the sea and rose to be a commander of a slave ship, becoming "one of the leading merchants and shipowners of Liverpool". Continuing, it says he married Ms. Brideson and captured a Spanish ship rich in gold and treasure. A Liverpool paper which announced his death at the age of 78, called him a "most useful member of society".

Boats was the first slaver to have his ships sheathed in copper to prevent infestations of wood-boring parasites.

== Sources ==
- Richardson, David (2007). Liverpool and Transatlantic Slavery. UK: Liverpool University Press. ISBN 978-1-84631-066-9.
