= African Company Act 1750 =

Act of the Parliament of Great Britain

- Act of Parliament
- Parliament of Great Britain
- Long title: An Act for allowing further Time to the Commissioners appointed by and in Pursuance of an Act of the Twenty-third Year of His present Majesty's Reign, in intituled, "An Act for extending and improving the Trade to Africa," to inquire into the Claims of certain Creditors of the Royal African Company therein mentioned, and for the Relief of David Crichton, and for restraining the said Company from disposing of such of their Effects as are therein mentioned, and for staying all Suits for Money due from or on the account of the said Company, for the Time therein mentioned.
- Citation: 24 Geo. 2. c. 49
- Territorial extent: Great Britain

Dates
- Royal assent: 25 June 1751
- Commencement: 17 January 1751 (Note: Start of session.)
- Repealed: 15 July 1867
Other legislation
| Repealed by | Statute Law Revision Act 1867 |

Status: Repealed

Text of statute as originally enacted

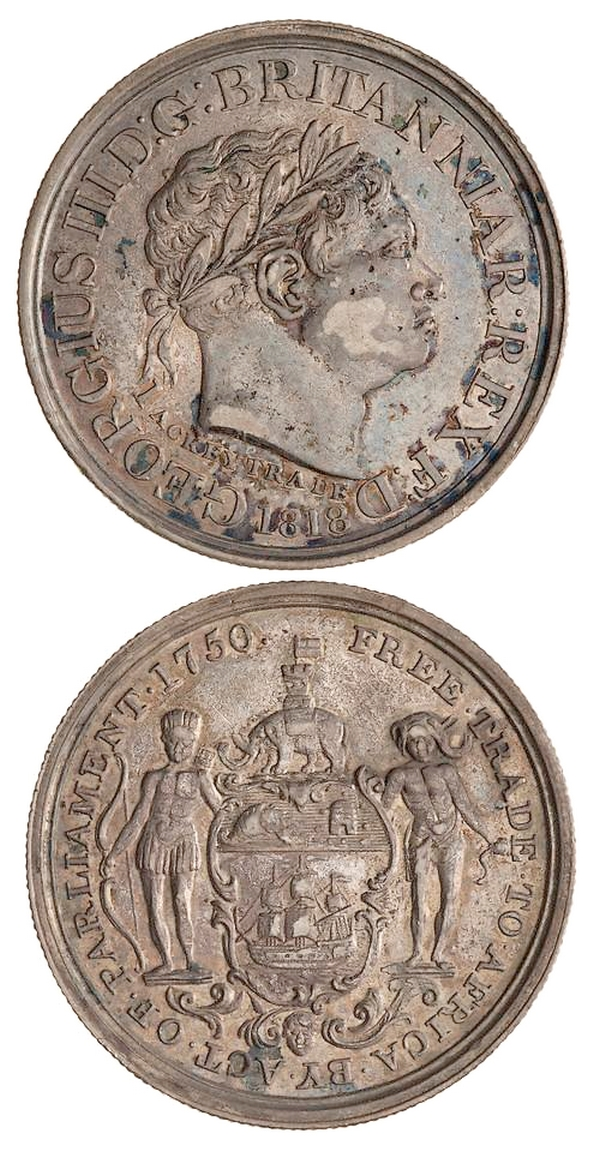
Gold Coast ackey coin with the inscription "Free Trade to Africa by Act of Parliament 1750" commemorating the passage of the African Company Act

The African Company Act 1750 (24 Geo. 2. c. 49) was an act of the Parliament of Great Britain which dissolved the Royal African Company and created the African Company of Merchants, to whom the assets of the former were passed.

The Royal African Company had been in financial difficulties for many years, but by 1747 these difficulties grew more acute. They also informed parliament in February of that year that it was incapable of defending its forts and castles against possible attack by the French.

== Subsequent developments ==
The whole act was repealed by section 1 of, and the schedule to, the Statute Law Revision Act 1867 (30 & 31 Vict. c. 59), which came into force on 15 July 1867.
