= Richard Gildart =

English merchant and politician

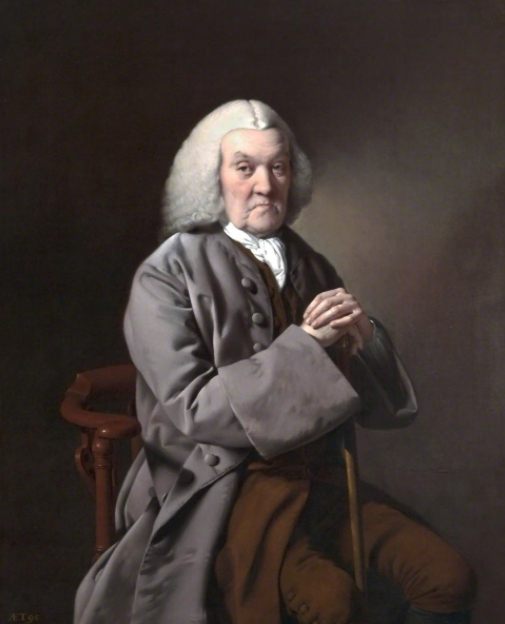
Richard Gildart by Joseph Wright of Derby

Richard Gildart (1673 – 25 January 1770) was an English merchant from Liverpool who was engaged in the slave trade. He was Mayor of Liverpool three times, 1714, 1731, 1736 and Member of Parliament for Liverpool from 1734 to 1754.

Richard was the son of James Geldart and Elizabeth Sweeting of Middleham, Yorkshire. He moved to Liverpool in the 1690s, becoming a freeman of Liverpool Corporation on November 2, 1697. About 1707 he married Ann Johnson, daughter of Thomas Johnson (1664-1729), a prominent Liverpool businessman involved in the tobacco trade.

He was a founding member of the African Company of Merchants in 1752, and also was elected to their executive committee in 1758.

Parliament of Great Britain
Preceded by Sir Thomas Aston, Bt. Thomas Bootle	Member of Parliament for Liverpool; 1734–1754; With: Thomas Salusbury (1734-1754)	Succeeded by John Hardman; Thomas Salusbury
