= John Hardman (MP) =

English slave trader (died 1755)

John Hardman (c.1694 – 6 December 1755) was an English merchant and slave trader from Lancashire, England, who was elected as Member of Parliament (MP) for Liverpool in 1754. He and his brother were the owners of Allerton Hall during the 17th century and are believed to have been involved in 46 slave voyages from 1729 to 1761.

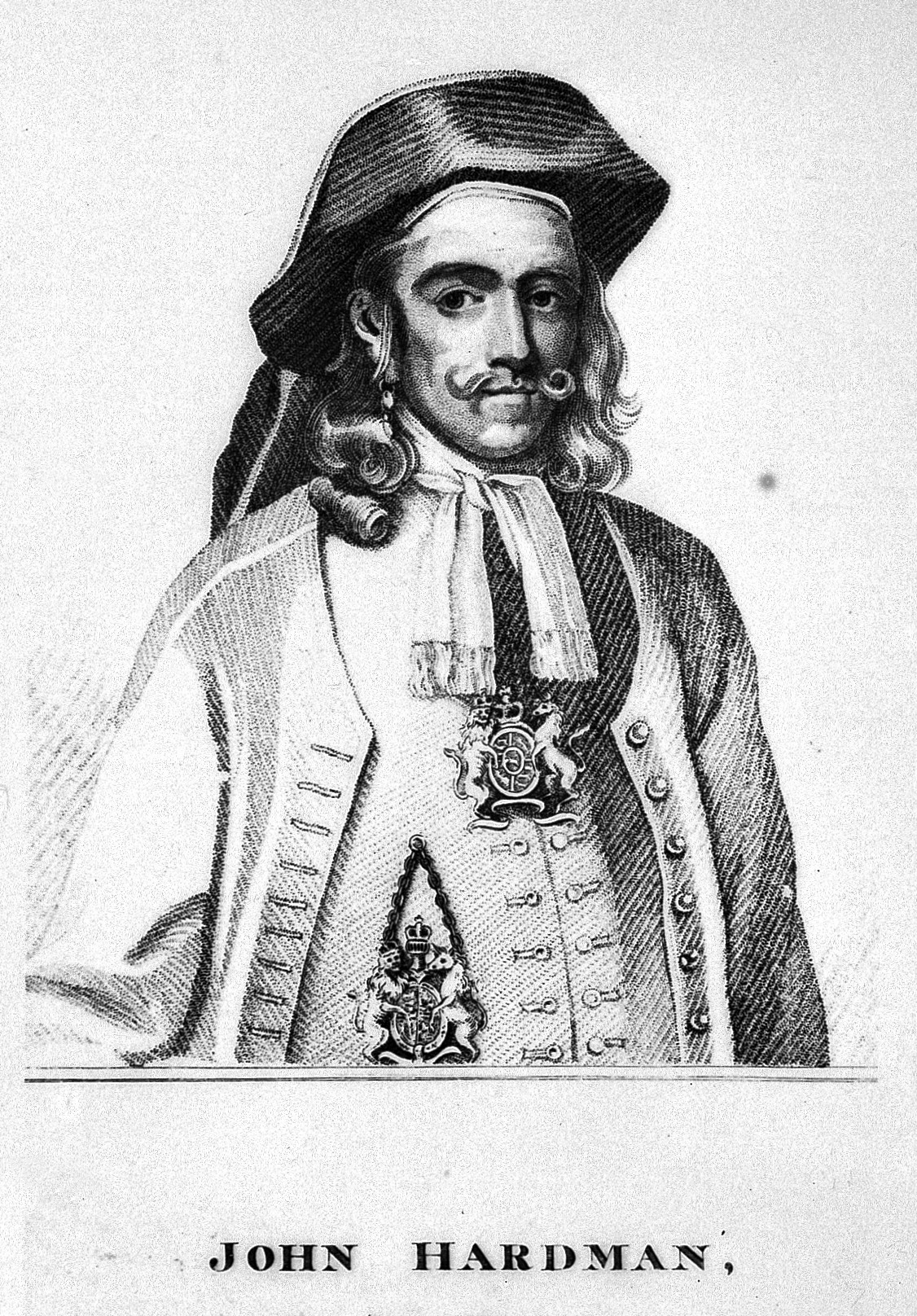
Portrait of John Hardman by Thomas Murray

== Biography ==
John Hardman was the son of Richard Hardman, merchant, of the manor of Rochdale, by his wife Elizabeth Fernyside. His brother, James Hardman (c.1692–1746) was also a slave trader and married to Jane Leigh (painted by Joseph Wright of Derby). The Hardmans were an old Lancastrian landed gentry family.

While some contemporaries described Hardman as a mere 'West India merchant', he was known to have become engaged in the transatlantic slave trade by c. 1729. Indeed, the Hardman family were involved in 46 slave voyages from 1729 to 1761. A slave ship-owner, he was said to have had considerable knowledge of African and American trade.

In 1736, Hardman and his brother James purchased Allerton Hall and rebuilt it in the Palladian style. He inherited the estate following his brother's death in 1746.

Hardman regularly gave evidence to the Board of Trade on behalf of the Liverpool Corporation. He had also organised a survey on behalf of the Liverpool merchants of the possibility of a canal to join the rivers Trent and Mersey. In 1754, he was elected as a member of Parliament (MP) for that constituency, but died the following year on 6 December 1755.

== Appearance ==
According to Dagnall, John Hardman had a striking appearance with "flowing locks of golden hair, curled whiskers, earrings, and curiously cut coat and waistcoat. He paraded the streets in this bizarre attire to attract the attention of prospective customers."

== Legacy ==
Following his death, Allerton Hall went into possession of his brother's widow until her death in 1795, after which the estate was purchased by the prominent abolitionist William Roscoe. During the American Civil War, Charles K. Prioleau, a Confederate cotton merchant from Charleston, South Carolina, and his wife—'the 'Belle of Liverpool'—rented Allerton Hall as head of Fraser, Trenholm & Co. merchants, often considered the de facto Confederate embassy in Britain.

Hardman Earle, 1st Baronet was named after Hardman. Additionally, Hardman Street, Liverpool is named for the Hardman family of Rochdale and Allerton.

Parliament of Great Britain
Preceded by Richard Gildart	Member of Parliament for Liverpool; 1754–1755; With: Thomas Salusbury	Succeeded by Sir Ellis Cunliffe; Thomas Salusbury
