= Bight of Biafra =

Bight in the Gulf of Guinea

- Bight of Bonny
- Golfe du Biafra (French); Golfo de Biafra (Spanish); Golfo do Biafra (Portuguese)
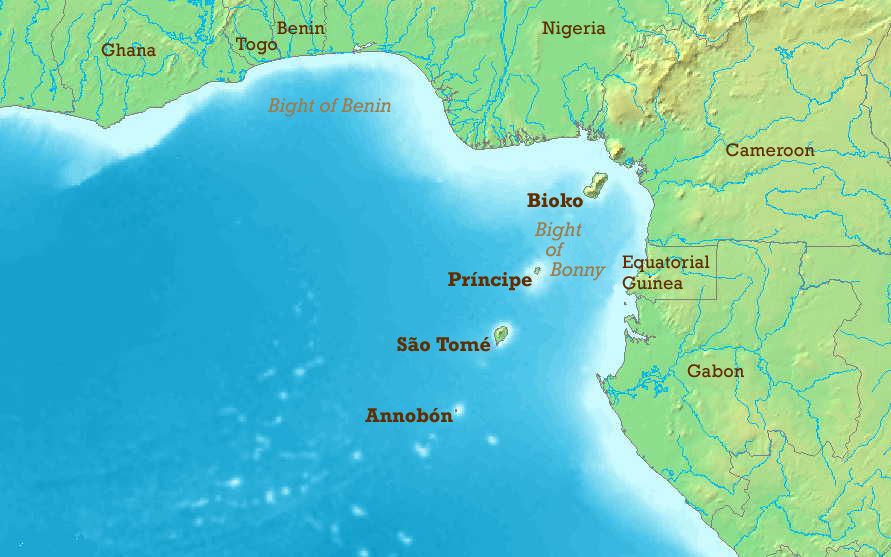
- Gulf of Guinea map showing the Bight of Biafra (labelled as Bonny).

- Location within Africa Location within Equatorial Guinea
- Coordinates: 2°50′N 8°0′E
- River sources: Niger, Wouri, Sanaga
- Ocean/sea sources: Gulf of Guinea; Atlantic Ocean
- Basin countries: Nigeria, Cameroon, Equatorial Guinea, Gabon
- Max. length: 300 km (190 mi)
- Max. width: 600 km (370 mi)
- Islands: Bioko

The Bight of Biafra, also known as the Bight of Bonny, is a bight off the west-central African coast, in the easternmost part of the Gulf of Guinea. It has also occasionally been referred to as the Bight of Africa because it is at this point where the direction of the Western coastline of the African continent most prominently changes from a north-south orientation to an east-west orientation.

== Geography ==
The Bight of Biafra, between Cape Formosa and Cape Lopez, is the most eastern part of the Gulf of Guinea; it contains the islands Bioko (part of Equatorial Guinea), São Tomé and Príncipe. The name Biafra – as indicating the country – fell into disuse in the later part of the 19th century

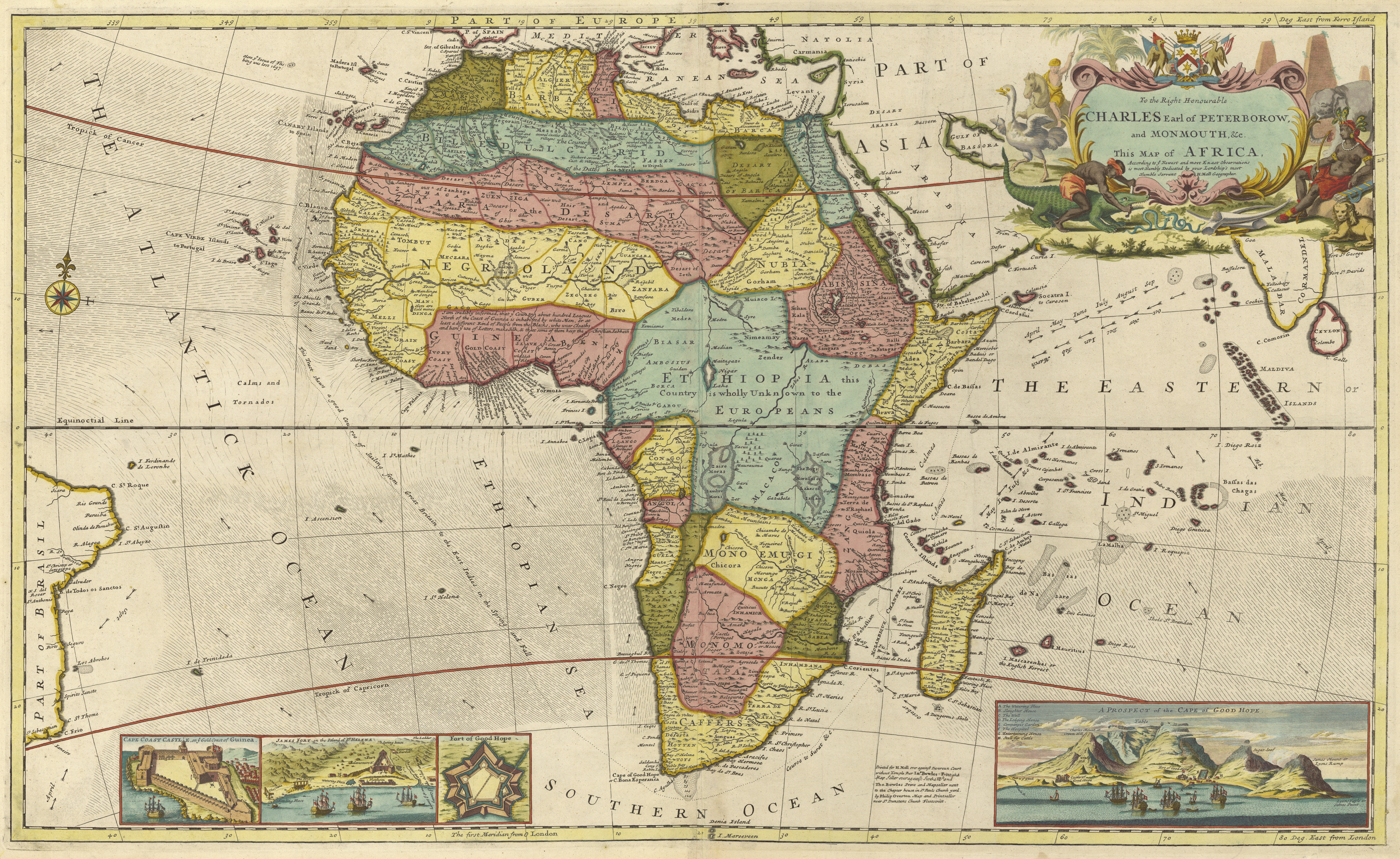
Early map of Africa depicting a region named "Biafar" in present day Cameroon

A 1710 map indicates that the region known as "Biafar" was located in present-day Cameroon.

The Bight of Biafra extends east from the River Delta of the Niger in the north until it reaches Cape Lopez in Gabon. Besides the Niger River, other rivers reaching the bay are the Cross River, Calabar River, Ndian, Wouri, Sanaga, Nyong River, Ntem, Mbia, Mbini, Muni and Komo River.

The main islands in the Bay are Bioko and Príncipe; other important islands are Ilhéu Bom Bom, Ilhéu Caroço, Elobey Grande and Elobey Chico. Countries located on the Bight of Biafra are Cameroon, Nigeria, Equatorial Guinea (Bioko Island and Rio Muni), and Gabon

== History ==
The Bight of Biafra accounted for an estimated 10.7% of all enslaved people that were transported to the Americas between 1519-1700. Between 1701-1800, it accounted for an estimated 14.97%. Slaves purchased from the markets on the Bight of Biafra included Bamileke, Efik/Ibibio, Igbo, Tikar, Bakossi, Fang, Massa, Bubi and many more. These captured Africans arrived in what would become the United States and were sold in Virginia, which held 60% of all slaves on the eastern coast. Virginia and surrounding colonies held 30,000 slaves. Normally, enslaved people were cheaper when bought in Cameroon because they preferred to die rather than accept slavery.

By the middle of the eighteenth century, Bonny had emerged as the major slave trading port on the Bight of Biafra outpacing the earlier dominant slave ports at Elem Kalabari (also known then as New Calabar) and Old Calabar. These three ports together accounted for over 90% of the slave trade emanating from the Bight of Biafra.

=== Timeline ===
Between 1525 and 1859, the British accounted for over two-thirds of slaves exported from the Bight of Biafra to the New World.

In 1777, Portugal transferred control of Fernando Po and Annobón to Spanish suzerainty thus introducing Spain into the early colonial history of the Bight of Biafra.

In 1807, the United Kingdom made illegal the international trade in slaves, and the Royal Navy was deployed to forcibly prevent slavers from the United States, France, Spain, Portugal, Holland, West Africa and Arabia from plying their trade.

On 30 June 1849, Britain established its military influence over the Bight of Biafra by building a naval base and consulate on the island of Fernando Po, under the authority of the British Consuls of the Bight of Benin:

On 6 August 1861, the Bight of Biafra and the neighboring Bight of Benin (under its own British consuls) became a united British consulate, again under British consuls:

- May 1852–1853: Louis Fraser
- 1853-April 1859: Benjamin Campbell
- April 1859–1860: George Brand
- 1860-January 1861: Henry Hand
- January-May 1861: Henry Grant Foote
- May-6 August 1861: William McCoskry (acting)
- 1861-December 1864: Richard Francis Burton
- December 1864–1873: Charles Livingstone
- 1873-1878: George Hartley
- 1878-13 September 1879: David Hopkins
- 13 September 1879-5 June 1885: Edward Hyde Hewett.

In 1967, the Eastern Region of Nigeria seceded from the Nigerian State and adopted the name of its coastline, the adjoining Bight of Biafra, becoming the newly independent Republic of Biafra. This independence was short-lived as the new state lost the ensuing Nigerian Civil War. In 1975, by decree, the Nigerian government changed the name of the Bight of Biafra to the Bight of Bonny.

== Slave traders ==
- Daniel Backhouse
- George Case
- William Boats
- William Davenport
- John Shaw
- Samuel Shaw
