= African Company of Merchants =

British chartered company

Map of Royal African Company factories transferred to the African Company of Merchants.

The African Company of Merchants (also known as the Company of Merchants Trading to Africa) was a British chartered company which existed from 1752 to 1821. During its existence, the company administered British trading posts in the Gold Coast region of modern-day Ghana and engaged in the Atlantic slave trade, illegally from 1807 onwards. Controversy in Britain over the company's continuing involvement in the slave trade after 1807 eventually contributed to its dissolution, with the Gold Coast becoming a formal British colony in 1821.

== Background ==
The company was established by the African Company Act 1750 (24 Geo. 2. c. 49), and in 1752 replaced the Royal African Company which had been established in 1660. Unlike its predecessor, the African Company of Merchants was a regulated company, not a joint stock company: Clause IV of the African Company Act 1750 stated:

"That it shall not be lawful for the Company, established by this Act, to trade to or from Africa in their corporate or joint Capacity, or to have any joint or transferable Stock, or to borrow, or take up, any Sum or Sums of Money, on their Common Seal".

The assets of the Royal African Company were transferred to the new company and consisted primarily of nine trading posts or factories: Fort William, Fort James, Fort Sekondi, Fort Winneba, Fort Apollonia, Fort Tantumquery, Fort Metal Cross, Fort Komenda and Cape Coast Castle, the last of which was the administrative centre. This coastal area was dominated by the indigenous Fante people.

== African Committee ==
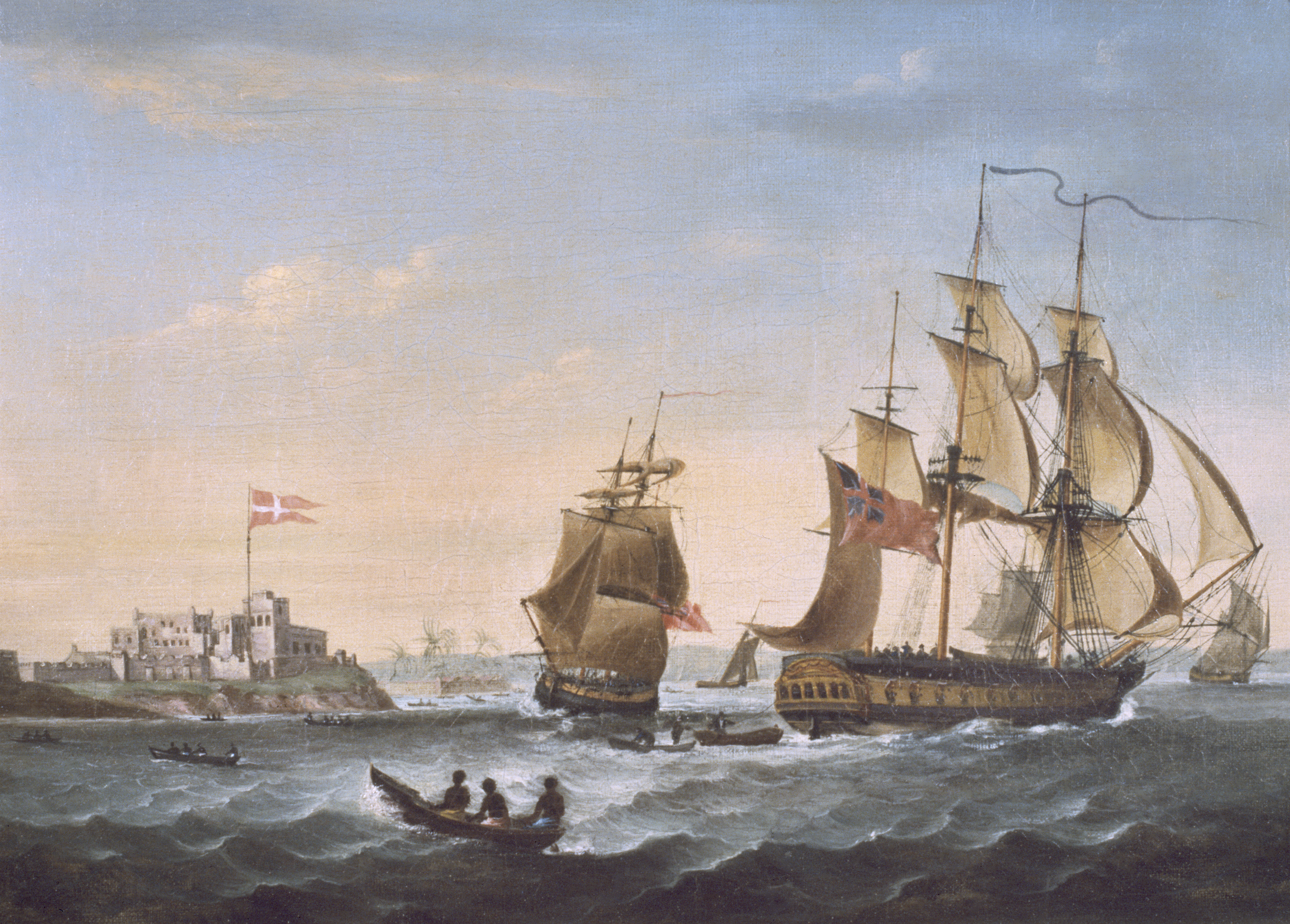
c. 1800 painting of two British slave ships off Fort Christiansborg

The company was managed by the African Committee, which was composed of nine committee members, three each from London, Liverpool and Bristol. The constitution stipulated that the committee should be elected annually from the general body of traders from these cities, who paid 40 shillings to be admitted to the company. According to the constitution, these committee members could only hold the post for three years. However, in 1772 a series of pamphlets were published claiming that the Committee members were not acting properly.

The company was funded by an annual grant approved by Parliament, which covered the costs of the London office and the forts. The committee had to report to the Exchequer, the Admiralty and, from 1782, the Secretary at War. John Shoolbred (1740–1802), uncle of another John Shoolbred noted for his advocacy of vaccination, was secretary to the committee for several years.

The imperial government prohibited the African slave trade after 1807, although the company continued to operate for some years afterwards. In keeping with the ethos of liberal reform, administrative authority over the African Company's territory was transferred to Governor Charles MacCarthy of Sierra Leone, Sierra Leone having been founded as a refuge colony for freed formerly enslaved peoples. (Governor McCarthy was subsequently killed in the First Anglo-Asante War.) In 1817, the company signed a treaty of friendship recognising the Asante claims to sovereignty over large areas of the coast, including areas claimed by the Fante. However, after it became public knowledge that the company had continued the slave trade within its privately held territory, the British government abolished the company in 1821.

== See also ==
- List of committee members of the African Company of Merchants
- Ashanti–Akim–Akwapim War
- Thomas Edward Bowdich
- List of members of the African Company of Merchants
