= 1931 Liverpool City Council election =

City Council election in Liverpool

- 1 November 1931

40 councillors' seats were up for election

Elections for Liverpool City Council were held on 1 November 1931.

Nine of the forty seats were uncontested.

After the election, the composition of the council was:

Party	Councillors	±	Aldermen	Total
Conservative	??	+8	??	??
Labour	??	-9	??	??
Liberal	??	0	??	??
Democratic Labour	??	??	??	??
Independent	??	??	??	??
Protestant	??	??	??	??

== Election result ==
Liverpool local election result 1931
Party	Seats	Gains	Losses	Net gain/loss	Seats %	Votes %	Votes	+/−
Conservative	31	8	0	+8	76%	55%	75,431	
Labour	5	0	9	-9	13%	35%	48,122	
Liberal	1	0	0	0	3%			
Democratic Labour	2				5%			
Independent	1							
Protestant								
Communist	0	0	0	0	0%			

== Ward results ==
* - Councillor seeking re-election

Comparisons are made with the 1930 election results.

=== Abercromby ===
No. 9 Abercromby
Party	Candidate	Votes	%	±%
Conservative	Alexander Maver Finlason	2,447	74%	
Labour	Bernard Louis Meyer	851	26%	
Majority		1,596		
Registered electors		9,493		
Turnout		3,298	35%	
Conservative hold		Swing		

=== Aigburth ===
No. 17 Aigburth
Party	Candidate	Votes	%	±%
Conservative	Wilfred Bowring Stoddart *	unopposed		
Registered electors		4,379		
Conservative hold		Swing		

=== Allerton ===
No. 35 Allerton
Party	Candidate	Votes	%	±%
Conservative	Mrs. Gertrude Elizabeth Wilson *	1,624	83%	
Labour	Miss Elsie Emily Louise Hickling	337	17%	
Majority		1,287		
Registered electors				
Turnout		1,961		
Conservative hold		Swing		

=== Anfield ===
No. 29 Anfield
Party	Candidate	Votes	%	±%
Conservative	George Young Williamson *	unopposed		
Registered electors				
Conservative hold		Swing		

=== Breckfield ===
No. 30 Breckfield
Party	Candidate	Votes	%	±%
Conservative	Henry James Pearson jr.	3,066	71%	
Labour	Alfred Hargreaves	1,281	29%	
Majority		1,785		
Registered electors		10,369		
Turnout		4,347	42%	
Conservative hold		Swing		

=== Brunswick ===
No. 11 Brunswick
Party	Candidate	Votes	%	±%
Labour	Patrick Moorhead *	3,442	74%	
Conservative	David Jukes	1,190	26%	
Majority		2,252		
Registered electors		9,088		
Turnout		4,632	51%	
Labour hold		Swing		

=== Castle Street ===
No. 7 Castle Street
Party	Candidate	Votes	%	±%
Conservative	Alfred Ernest Shennan	unopposed		
Registered electors				
Conservative hold		Swing		

=== Childwall ===
No. 38 Childwall
Party	Candidate	Votes	%	±%
Conservative	Gifford Cameron Ollason	1,094	57%	
Liberal	Alan Carmichael Williams	816	43%	
Majority		278		
Registered electors		3,105		
Turnout		1,910	62%	
Conservative hold		Swing		

=== Croxteth ===
No. 40 Croxteth
Party	Candidate	Votes	%	±%
Conservative	Frederick Walter Anderson	2,096	49%	
Labour	Mrs.Mary Lilian Hamilton	2,000	47%	
Independent	Charles William Heaton	184	4%	
Majority		96		
Registered electors		10,851		
Turnout		4,280	39%	
Conservative gain from Labour		Swing		

=== Dingle ===
No. 12 Dingle
Party	Candidate	Votes	%	±%
Conservative	Mrs. Nancy Proctor	4,108	48%	
Labour	James Lawrenson	3,027	35%	
Protestant	Richard Bradley	1,501	17%	
Majority		1,081		
Registered electors		15,469		
Turnout		8,636	56%	
Conservative hold		Swing		

=== Edge Hill ===
No. 18 Edge Hill
Party	Candidate	Votes	%	±%
Conservative	Stanley Ronald Williams	3,772	62%	
Labour	Mrs. Sarah Anne McArd	2,272	38%	
Majority		1,500		
Registered electors		13,274		
Turnout		6,044	46%	
Conservative gain from Labour		Swing		

=== Everton ===
No. 21 Everton
Party	Candidate	Votes	%	±%
Conservative	James McKay	3,128	53%	
Labour	Albert Smitton	2,735	47%	
Majority		393		
Registered electors		13,500		
Turnout		5,863	43%	
Conservative gain from Labour		Swing		

=== Exchange ===
No. 5 Exchange
Party	Candidate	Votes	%	±%
Independent	Peter Kavanagh *	1,228	91%	
Labour	Samuel Sydney Silverman	116	9%	
Majority		1,112		
Registered electors		2,492		
Turnout		1,344	54%	
Independent hold		Swing		

=== Fairfield ===
No. 31 Fairfield
Party	Candidate	Votes	%	±%
Conservative	Charles Gordon Snowden Gordon *	3,444	76%	
Labour	Richard Thomas Hughes	1,085	24%	
Majority		2,359		
Registered electors		10,220		
Turnout		4,529	44%	
Conservative hold		Swing		

=== Fazakerley ===
No. 27 Fazakerley
Party	Candidate	Votes	%	±%
Conservative	Ernest Tyson	3,125	66%	
Labour	Francis Bernard Fitzpatrick *	1,593	34%	
Majority		1,532		
Registered electors		10,866		
Turnout		4,718	43%	
Conservative gain from Labour		Swing		

=== Garston ===
No. 37 Garston
Party	Candidate	Votes	%	±%
Conservative	Joseph Williams *	2,189	55%	
Labour	William Sydney Dytor	1,813	45%	
Majority		376		
Registered electors		7,131		
Turnout		4,002	56%	
Conservative hold		Swing		

=== Granby ===
No. 14 Granby
Party	Candidate	Votes	%	±%
Liberal	Sir Frederick Charles Bowring*	2,974	75%	
Labour	James Johnstone	1,015	25%	
Majority		1,959		
Registered electors		9,918		
Turnout		3,989	40%	
Liberal hold		Swing		

=== Great George ===
No. 10 Great George
Party	Candidate	Votes	%	±%
Democratic Labour	Harry Leo Gaffeney *	858	59%	
Labour	Patrick Campbell	594	41%	
Majority		264		
Registered electors		5,043		
Turnout		1,452	29%	
Democratic Labour hold		Swing		

=== Kensington ===
No. 19 Kensington
Party	Candidate	Votes	%	±%
Conservative	Joseph Gardner	3,877	69%	
Labour	Joseph Whitehead	1,708	31%	
Majority		2,169		
Registered electors		11,351		
Turnout		5,585	49%	
Conservative hold		Swing		

=== Kirkdale ===
No. 24 Kirkdale
Party	Candidate	Votes	%	±%
Conservative	Francis Samuel Henwood Ashcroft	3,801	44%	
Labour	Robert Joseph McDonnell *	2,708	31%	
Majority		1,093		
Registered electors		17,017		
Turnout		8,726	51%	
Conservative gain from Labour		Swing		

=== Little Woolton ===
No. 39 Little Woolton
Party	Candidate	Votes	%	±%
Conservative	Rupert Henry Bremner *	unopposed		
Registered electors				
Conservative hold		Swing		

=== Low Hill ===
No. 20 Low Hill
Party	Candidate	Votes	%	±%
Conservative	Gordon Robert Kitchen	3,334	59%	
Labour	Fred Robinson *	2,273	41%	
Majority		1,061		
Registered electors		11,271		
Turnout		5,607	50%	
Conservative gain from Labour		Swing		

=== Much Woolton ===
No. 36 Much Woolton
Party	Candidate	Votes	%	±%
Conservative	Herbert Neville Bewley	885	52%	
Independent	Ernest Whiteley	821	48%	
Majority		64	4%	
Registered electors		2,299		
Turnout		1,706	74%	
Conservative hold		Swing		

=== Netherfield ===
No. 22 Netherfield
Party	Candidate	Votes	%	±%
Conservative	William John Matthew Clark	3,632	55%	
Labour	John Bagot *	2,984	45%	
Majority		648		
Registered electors		12,090		
Turnout		6,616	55%	
Conservative gain from Labour		Swing		

=== North Scotland ===
No. 2 North Scotland
Party	Candidate	Votes	%	±%
Labour	Patrick Fay *	2,966	88%	
Communist	Leo Joseph McGree	412	12%	
Majority		2,554		
Registered electors		8,758		
Turnout		3,378	39%	
Labour hold		Swing		

=== Old Swan ===
No. 32 Old Swan
Party	Candidate	Votes	%	±%
Conservative	John Waterworth *	4,495	72%	
Labour	Alfred Demain	1,780	28%	
Majority		2,715		
Registered electors		15,881		
Turnout		6,275	40%	
Conservative hold		Swing		

=== Prince's Park ===
No. 13 Prince's Park
Party	Candidate	Votes	%	±%
Conservative	Joseph Davies Griffiths *	3,122	72%	
Labour	John Hamilton	1,213	28%	
Majority		1,909		
Registered electors		9,913		
Turnout		4,335	44%	
Conservative hold		Swing		

=== Sandhills ===
No. 1 Sandhills
Party	Candidate	Votes	%	±%
Labour	Thomas Henry Dunford	2,355	88%	
Communist	Mrs.Beatrice Bruce	314	12%	
Majority		314		
Registered electors		9,499		
Turnout		2,669	28%	
Labour hold		Swing		

=== St. Anne's ===
No. 6 St. Anne's
Party	Candidate	Votes	%	±%
Labour	John David Mack *	unopposed		
Registered electors				
Labour hold		Swing		

=== St. Domingo ===
No. 23 St. Domingo
Party	Candidate	Votes	%	±%
Conservative	Charles Harold Leftwich	2,292	41%	
Protestant	Albert Clayton	1,848	33%	
Labour	Frederick Jones	1,489	26%	
Majority		444		
Registered electors		11,734		
Turnout		5,629	48%	
Conservative hold		Swing		

=== St. Peter's ===
No. 8 St. Peter's
Party	Candidate	Votes	%	±%
Conservative	Herbert Wolfe Levy	973	81%	
Labour	Joseph Nugent	232	19%	
Majority		741		
Registered electors		2,979		
Turnout		1,205	40%	
Conservative hold		Swing		

=== Sefton Park East ===
No. 15 Sefton Park East
Party	Candidate	Votes	%	±%
Conservative	Captain Gordon Robertson	unopposed		
Registered electors				
Conservative hold		Swing		

=== Sefton Park West ===
No. 16 Sefton Park West
Party	Candidate	Votes	%	±%
Conservative	James Graham Reece *	unopposed		
Registered electors				
Conservative hold		Swing		

=== South Scotland ===
No. 3 South Scotland
Party	Candidate	Votes	%	±%
Labour	Joseph Harrington *	unopposed		
Registered electors				
Labour hold		Swing		

=== Vauxhall ===
No. 4 Vauxhall
Party	Candidate	Votes	%	±%
Democratic Labour	Thomas Arthur Murphy	849	57%	
Labour	Arthur Brian Hoer *	642	43%	
Majority		207		
Registered electors		3,783		
Turnout		1,491	39%	
Democratic Labour gain from Labour				

=== Walton ===
No. 25 Walton
Party	Candidate	Votes	%	±%
Conservative	Reginald Richard Bailey	5,530	75%	
Labour	William James Riddick	1,888	25%	
Majority		3,642		
Registered electors		16,395		
Turnout		7,418	45%	
Conservative hold		Swing		

=== Warbreck ===
No. 26 Warbreck
Party	Candidate	Votes	%	±%
Conservative	Alexander Critchley *	4,504	84%	
Labour	Richard Austin Rockliffe	883	16%	
Majority		3,621		
Registered electors		12,376		
Turnout		5,387	44%	
Conservative hold		Swing		

=== Wavertree ===
No. 34 Wavertree
Party	Candidate	Votes	%	±%
Conservative	John Village	4,767	77%	
Labour	John Reginald Bevins	1,396	23%	
Majority		3,371		
Registered electors		14,576		
Turnout		6,163	42%	
Conservative hold		Swing		

=== Wavertree West ===
No. 33 Wavertree West
Party	Candidate	Votes	%	±%
Conservative	Naphtali Julius Price	2,936	67%	
Labour	Charles Matthew Belk	1,444	33%	
Majority		1,492		
Registered electors		8,906		
Turnout		4,380	49%	
Conservative gain from Labour		Swing		

=== West Derby ===
No. 28 West Derby
Party	Candidate	Votes	%	±%
Conservative	Robert Duncan-French *	unopposed		
Registered electors				
Conservative hold		Swing		

== Aldermanic elections ==
=== Aldermanic election 9 November 1931 ===
The term of office of Alderman Patrick Jeremiah Kelly (Independent (politician), expired on 9 November 1931), he was re-elected as an Alderman by the Councillors on the same date

Aldermanic Election 9 November 1931
Party	Candidate	Votes	%	Allocated ward
Independent	Patrick Jeremiah Kelly	85	99%	No. 27 Fazakerley
Independent	Peter Kavanagh	1	1%	

=== Aldermanic election 1 June 1932 ===
Caused by the death on 18 March 1932 of Alderman Charles Wilson (Labour, elected as an alderman on 9 November 1929). In his place Councillor Joseph Belger (Independent, last elected 1 November 1930) was elected by the councillors as an alderman on 1 June 1932

Aldermanic Election 9 November 1931
Party	Candidate	Votes	%	Allocated ward
Independent	Councillor Joseph Belger	42	62%	No. 18 Edge Hill
Labour	Councillor Laurence King	26	38%	

=== Aldermanic election 6 July 1932 ===
Caused by the death on 13 May 1932 of Alderman Herbart John Davis (Conservative, elected as an alderman on 6 March 1929). In his place Mr. Richard Rutherford (Conservative, whose resignation as an alderman was reported to the council on 7 October 1931) was elected by the councillors as an alderman on 6 July 1932

Aldermanic Election 6 July 1932
Party	Candidate	Votes	%	Allocated ward
Conservative	Mr. Richard Rutherford	46	79%	No. 34 Wavertree
Labour	Councillor Laurence King	18	21%	

The term of office to expire on 9 November 1935.

== By-elections ==
=== No. 4 Vauxhall, 3 November 1931 ===
Caused by the resignation of Councillor Dr. Percy Henry Hayes (Labour, Vauxhall, last elected on 1 November 1929), which was reported to the council on 21 October 1931.

No. 4 Vauxhall
Party	Candidate	Votes	%	±%
	Stephen McBride	771	61%	
Labour	Stanley Part	486	39%	
Majority		285		
Registered electors		3,783		
Turnout		1,257	33%	
gain from [[Labour|Labour]]		Swing		

=== No. 34 Wavertree, 9 December 1931 ===
Caused by the death of Councillor Albert Edward Martin (Conservative, elected to the Wavertree ward on 1 November 1929).

No. 34 Wavertree
Party	Candidate	Votes	%	±%
Conservative	Frederick Redmond	unopposed		
Registered electors		14,576		
Conservative hold		Swing		

=== No. 4 Vauxhall, Tuesday 28 June 1932 ===
Caused by the death on 18 March 1932 of Alderman Charles Wilson (Labour, elected as an alderman on 9 November 1929). In his place Councillor James Belger (Independent, last elected 1 November 1930) was elected by the councillors as an alderman on 1 June 1932

No. 4 Vauxhall
Party	Candidate	Votes	%	±%
Independent	James O'Hare	801	55%	
Labour	Arthur Brian Hoer	651	45%	
Majority		150		
Registered electors		3,783		
Turnout		1,452	38%	
Independent hold		Swing		

=== No. 13 Prince's Park, 27 September 1932 ===
Caused by the death on 25 August 1932 of Councillor Alfred Wood (Conservative, last elected 1 November 1929)

No. 13 Prince's Park
Party	Candidate	Votes	%	±%
Conservative	Charles Roland Clare	1,794	57%	
Labour	Alfred Demain	1,331	43%	
Majority		463		
Registered electors		9,913		
Turnout		3,125	32%	
Conservative hold		Swing		

== See also ==
- Liverpool City Council
- Liverpool Town Council elections 1835 - 1879
- Liverpool City Council elections 1880–present
- Mayors and Lord Mayors of Liverpool 1207 to present
- History of local government in England
