= A Wanderer in the Spirit Lands =

1896 book about the afterlife

A Wanderer in the Spirit Lands is a book published in 1896 that purports to describe the afterlife realms and experiences of a spirit entity named Franchezzo, an Italian socialite who squanders his life on "wine, women and song". It was written by A. Farnese, identified as the "transcriber" of the work, with actual authorship attributed to the spirit.

== Synopsis ==
The book presents a first-hand written account of Franchezzo's purported journey through various "spirit lands" or planes of existence in the afterlife following his death. It describes how he initially finds himself in a dark realm resembling traditional concepts of Hell, inhabited by souls trapped in negative states like greed, hatred and selfishness. According to the narrative, these souls experienced suffering as a consequence of their own misdeeds in life. With the guidance of benevolent spirits, Franchezzo is depicted as gradually progressing to higher, more transcendent realms of beauty and light. These are said to be populated by souls who lived moral, unselfish lives on Earth.

The book provides vivid descriptions of how the spirit world's environments are shaped by the thoughts, beliefs and spiritual development of their inhabitants. Throughout the work, emphasis is placed on the importance of knowledge, selflessness, and spiritual evolution in the afterlife. While affirming the existence of an afterlife governed by divine laws, the book does not support the concept of reincarnation back into physical life on Earth.

== Reception ==
A review in the Liverpool Mercury described the narrative as interesting but obviously untrue, comparing it unfavorably to the works of Dante. The review condemned the book as "unchristian from beginning to end, though evidently intending to be, not only highly moral, but religious."
