= John Sheehan (Liverpool politician) =

Lord Mayor of Liverpool
- In office 1956–1957
- Preceded by: Reginald Richard Bailey
- Succeeded by: Frank Hamilton Cain L.L.D.

John Sheehan (1885–1972) was a Liverpool City Councillor and Alderman who served as Lord Mayor of Liverpool.

== Biography ==
Sheehan was the successful labour candidate for South Scotland ward and was elected to Liverpool City Council in 1929. He represented South Scotland Ward from November 1929 until 1953 when the ward was absorbed under new boundary revisions. He was subsequently elected to represent Vauxhall ward. He was elected as an Alderman in October 1953.

He served as Lord Mayor of Liverpool from 1956 to 1957. As Lord Mayor he led a Liverpool civic delegation on a tour of the Russian Black Sea Port of Odessa.

== See also ==
- 1929 Liverpool City Council election
- 1953 Liverpool City Council election
- Liverpool City Council elections 1880–present
- Liverpool City Council
- Mayors and Lord Mayors of Liverpool 1207 to present
