= The Kaleidoscope =

The Kaleidoscope; or, Literary and Scientific Mirror was an English weekly published between 1818 and 1831 by the Liverpool publisher Egerton Smith (1774–1841), who had established the Liverpool Mercury in 1811. The magazine's name was taken from David Brewster's recent invention. The first number appeared on 28 July 1818 in folio form; two years later the publication became an eight-page quarto. The price was kept at threepence-halfpenny throughout the magazine's history.

An anonymous writer for the British Quarterly Review suggested that the Kaleidoscope was Britain's first cheap weekly miscellany: "It consisted of slight original and selected articles in literature, science and art, and aimed at that happy combination of instruction and amusement which has since been more elaborately developed in still cheaper serials." Contributors included William and Mary Howitt, and the magazine also inserted the American Washington Irving's Sketch Book.

The last number bore the date 6 September 1831. The magazine was being discontinued, Egerton Smith informed his readers, since the new railways had disrupted road distribution by stage-coach.
