= John Japp =

Local politician and Lord Mayor of Liverpool (1844–1911)

John Japp J.P.

Lord Mayor of Liverpool
- In office 1906–1907
- Preceded by: Joseph Ball
- Succeeded by: Richard Caton, M.D.

John Japp JP (1844–1911) was a leading Liverpool shipowner and local politician who served as Lord Mayor of Liverpool.

== Biography ==
Japp was born in Montrose, Scotland. He was the son of Francis Japp, partner in the firm J. & F. Japp, Cabinetmakers. He arrived in Liverpool from Scotland in 1865 and developed a leading role in the city's shipping community. He started business as a shipbroker and shipowner and was later a partner in the well-known firm of Japp & Kirby, shipowners, brokers and merchants in Chapel Street.

He entered Liverpool City Council as a Liberal Party councillor in 1899, representing the Sefton Park East ward. He was noted for his service on the education authority, especially with regard to technical instruction in nautical subjects. He was also a Justice of the Peace.

In 1906–07 he served as the second Scottish Lord Mayor of Liverpool. His Mayoral allowance was £2000.

His cousin was James William Japp, Provost of Montrose from 1878 to 1881.

== See also ==
- 1899 Liverpool City Council election
- Liverpool City Council elections 1880–present
- Liverpool City Council
- Mayors and Lord Mayors of Liverpool 1207 to present
