= Wolstenholme Creative Space =

Former art space in Liverpool

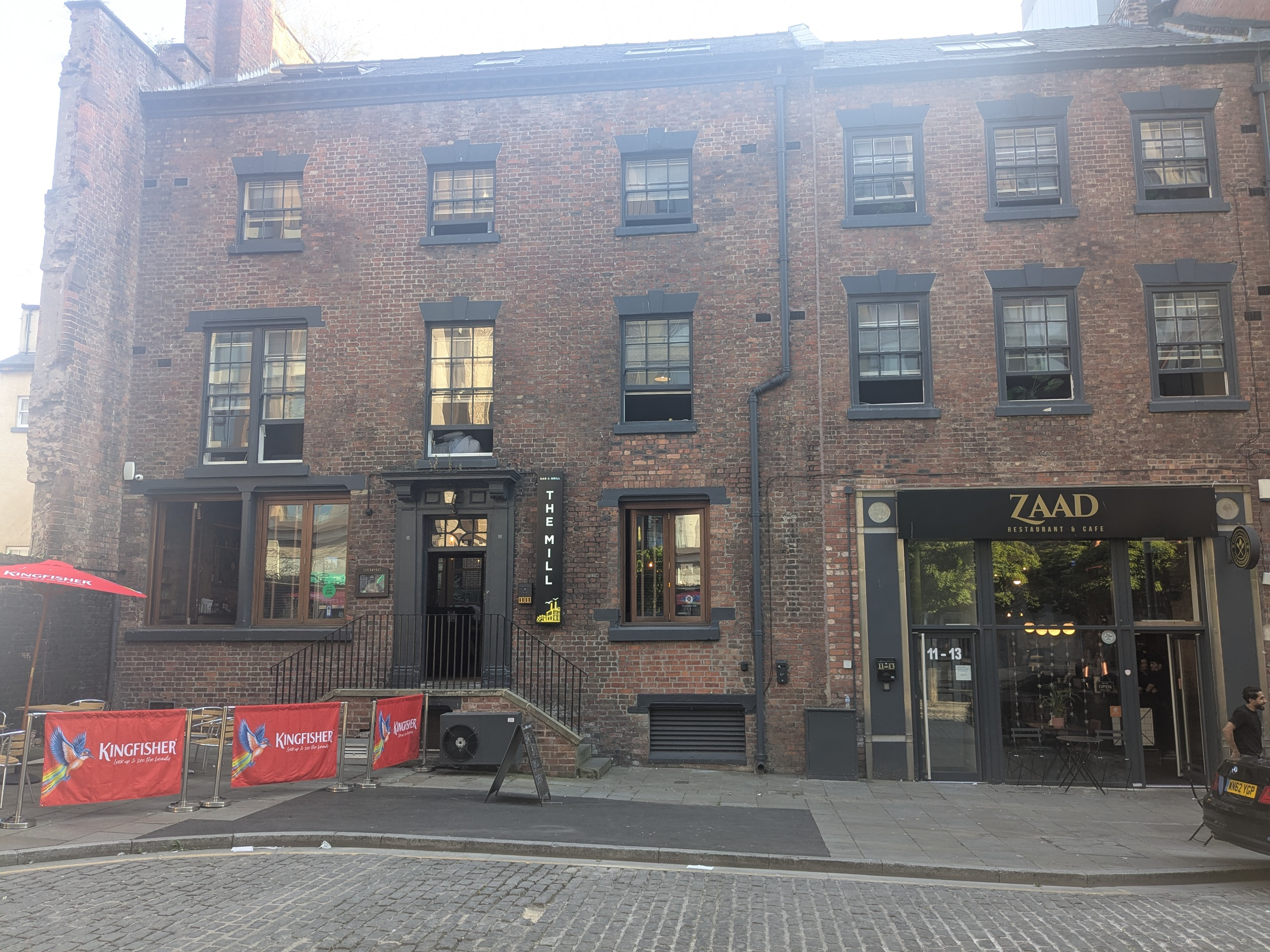
- Former premises of WCS in 2026

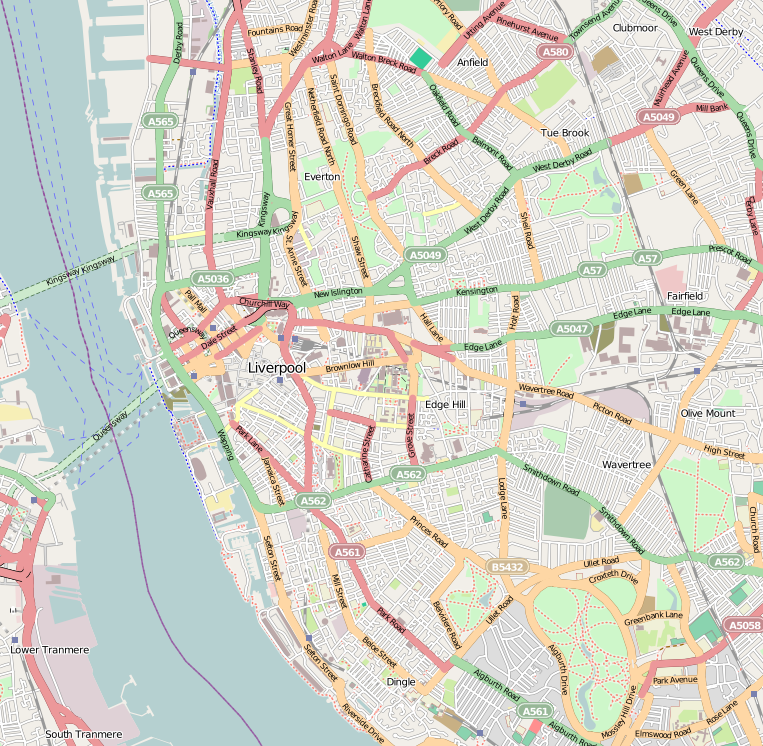
- Location within Liverpool
- Established: Late 2009
- Dissolved: December 18, 2012; 13 years ago (Note: Although its Wolstenholme Square premises closed in December 2012, WCS continued operating as an organisation. In May 2013, it presented Rob Bremner's exhibition Liverpool, Unfinished at Drop the Dumbells as part of the LOOK/13 photography festival. Wolstenholme Creative Space Limited has not been formally dissolved until 4 March 2014.)
- Location: 11-13 Wolstenholme Square; Ropewalks; Liverpool L1 4JJ
- Coordinates: 53.40217°N 2.98205°W
- Type: Not-for-profit organization
- Directors: Priya Sharma; Caroline Smith
- Website: wolstenholmecreativespace.com

Wolstenholme Creative Space (abbreviated as WCS) was an independent not-for-profit contemporary art gallery, music venue and artists' studio complex housed at Numbers 11-13 Wolstenholme Square, the last surviving Georgian buildings in Wolstenholme Square, Liverpool. It developed in late 2009 from an earlier artist-run space, when the space's coordinators, Priya Sharma and Caroline Smith, assumed responsibility for the premises under the Wolstenholme Creative Space name and became its directors.

WCS worked with external artists, collectives and organisations, while also producing its own programme of exhibitions and events. Its programme focused on emerging artists across a range of art forms, often drawing on DIY practices and responding creatively to the building and its deteriorated condition. The organisation also provided affordable studio space for more than 30 artists. In 2011, rents were reported to be "as little as £35 per month", with the studios spread across "several dilapidated floors".

Wolstenholme Creative Space held a significant place within Liverpool's alternative arts scene. In 2012, The Double Negative described WCS, together with Red Wire and The Royal Standard, as three key artist-led spaces established after 2005, largely by graduates of Liverpool John Moores University. Around Wolstenholme Square, WCS formed part of a wider artistic shift alongside The Kazimier and MelloMello, as disused buildings were repurposed for music, performance and visual art. Its connection to Liverpool's independent music scene was further reinforced by Bido Lito! describing WCS as a "second home" for bands, artists and independent promoters.

Having operated for "a little over three years", the Wolstenholme venue closed at the end of 2012 after the building was "deemed structurally unsound". The loss of WCS and other artistic spaces around Wolstenholme Square drew criticism in The Skinny, Liverpool Echo, The Post, and from Gabrielle de la Puente of The White Pube.

== Background ==
=== Wolstenholme Projects ===
In 2006, The Art Organisation (TAO), an arts initiative that worked with landlords to bring disused buildings into temporary cultural use, secured the use of premises at Wolstenholme Square from Frenson Properties. During that year's Liverpool Biennial, TAO operated them as The Re-Evolutionary Gallery. The premises subsequently became the base of Wolstenholme Projects, an artist-run space that began providing exhibition, studio and workshop space, particularly for recent graduates of Liverpool John Moores University. The group also carried out improvements to the neglected premises. By late 2009, the building required further investment and redevelopment. Its then-coordinators, Priya Sharma and Caroline Smith, took over its management under the name Wolstenholme Creative Space and became the organisation's directors.

== Music and film programme ==
External videos
- Record Store Day 2012 at WCS
- Liverpool and beyond's independent Record and Zine Fair at WCS
- WCS Record & Zine Fair

WCS had a strong connection with music, hosting festivals and live performances by local and international acts. The 2011 festival FIESTA OBSCENIC featured early performances by Liverpool bands Stealing Sheep and Outfit, as well as of Anna Lena and the Orchids, Carnival Kids, Dan Croll and United Vibrations. Jonquil and PINS appeared at the venue during Liverpool Sound City 2012. Other performers included Barberos, Child Abuse, Divorce, Ex-Easter Island Head, Iceage, Iron Witch, Is Tropical, Lucky Dragons, Philip Jeck, The Pine Hill Haints, Ruins Alone, Slow Down, Molasses, Soriah, Ultralyd, Wave Machines, and We Came Out Like Tigers.

The space hosted screenings of cult and experimental films, including L.A. Zombie followed by a Q&A with Bruce LaBruce, and Harmony Korine's Trash Humpers preceded by a recorded introduction in which Korine dedicated the screening to "the scum, the lowlife of Liverpool, people on the street".
