= Mary Ann Kelty =

British religious writer

- Born: 1789; Cambridge
- Died: January 8, 1873 (aged 83–84); Peckham

Mary Ann Kelty (1789 – 8 January 1873) was a British religious writer. She is said to have written the first religious novel.

== Life ==
Kelty was born in Cambridge in 1789. Her father was a surgeon who rapidly became estranged from his wife. As a result, Kelty received her education from friends of her brother who was a senior fellow of Cambridge University.

Kelty's first novels were published in America, Britain and Europe in the 1820s. Her parents died in 1822, the same year as the publication of The Favourite of Nature, a tale. This was said to be the first religious novel.

Kelty became more religious and she was intrigued by the ideas of the evangelist Charles Simeon and, towards the end of her life, by the Quakers. She left Cambridge and moved to Peckham in 1832.

Kelty included the Cambridge historian Professor William Smyth in her memoir, Reminiscences of Thought and Feeling, as "the professor".

Kelty died in Peckham in 1873.

== Works include ==
- The Favourite of Nature, a tale, 1822
- Osmond: A Tale
- Trials: A Tale
- The Story of Isabel
- Alice Rivers
- Visiting my relations, and its results, 1852
- Reminiscences of Thought and Feeling
- The Solace of a Solitaire: A Record of Facts and Feelings, 1869
