= 1953 Liverpool City Council election =

1953 UK local election

← 1952	7 May 1953	1954 →
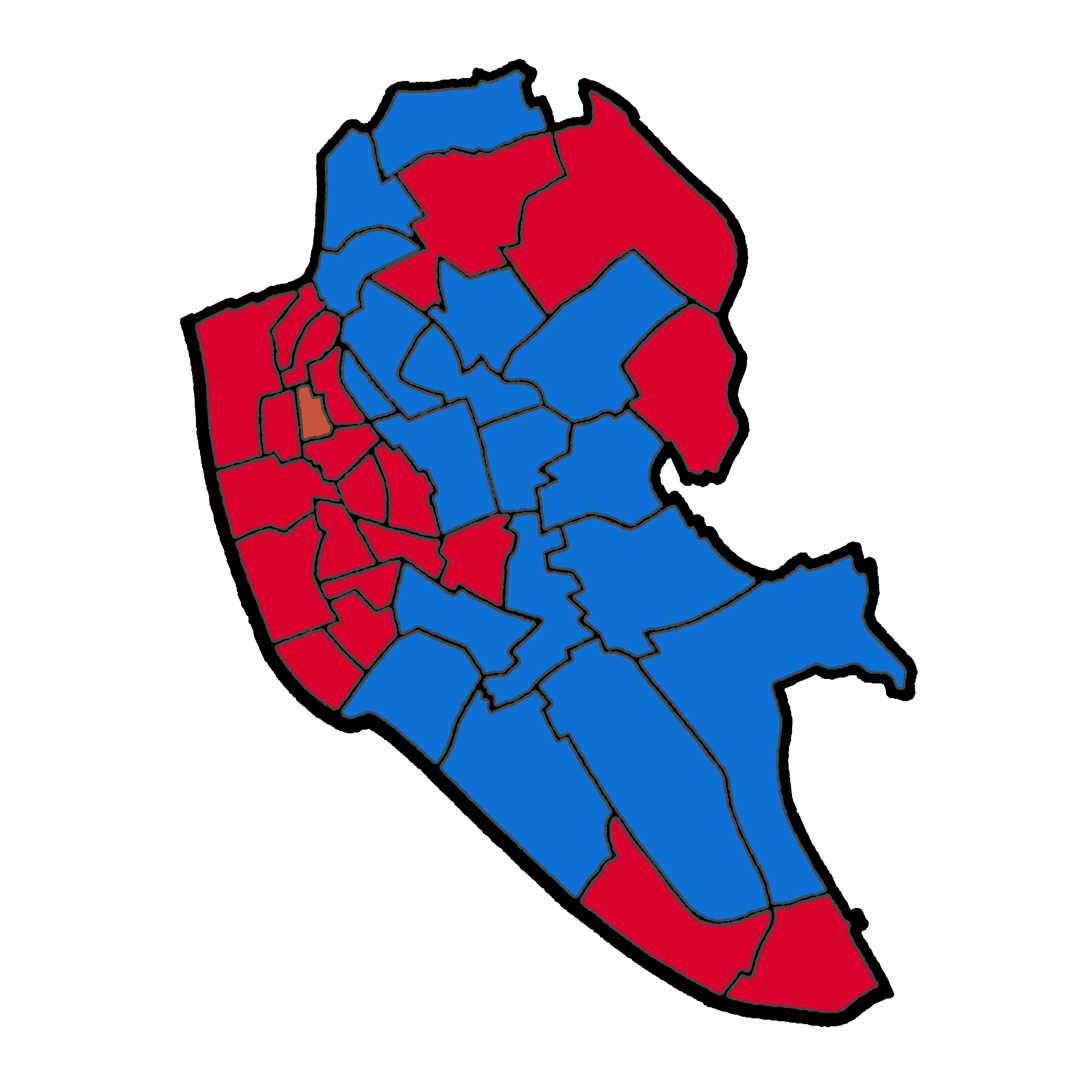
- Map of Liverpool showing wards won (first placed party)

Elections to Liverpool City Council were held on 7 May 1953.

After the election, the composition of the council was:

Party	Councillors	±	Aldermen	Total
Conservative	53	-14	28	81
Labour	65	+19	7	72
Protestant	2	-2	1	3
Liberal	0	0	2	2

== Election result ==
Liverpool local election result 1953
Party	Seats	Gains	Losses	Net gain/loss	Seats %	Votes %	Votes	+/−
Conservative	53					49%	120,667	
Labour	65					43%	117,333	
Protestant	3					2.1%	5,090	
Liberal	0	0	0	0	0%	0.14%	341	
Democratic Labour	0	0	0	0	0%	0.41%	1,013	
Ind. Conservative	0	0	0	0	0%	0.26%	648	
Communist	0	0	0	0	0%	0.12%	301	

== Ward results ==
* - Councillor seeking re-election

^{(PARTY)} - Party of former Councillor

This was the first election with new boundaries since the 1952 election.

Deleted ward names : Brunswick, Castle Street, Edge Hill, Exchange, Garston, Great George, Kirkdale, Little Woolton, Much Woolton, North Scotland, St. Anne's, St. Peter's, Sefton Park East, Sefton Park West, South Scotland, Walton, Wavertree, Wavertree West and West Derby.

New ward names : Arundel, Broadgreen, Central, Church, Clubmoor, County, Gillmoss, Melrose, Picton, Pirrie, St. James', St. Mary's, St. Michael's, Smithdown, Speke, Tuebrook, Westminster and Woolton.

This was an 'all up' election were three councillors were elected for each ward. The term of office for the councillor with the largest number of votes in each ward was three years. The councillor with the second highest number of votes was elected for two years, and the councillor with the third highest number of votes in each ward was elected for one year. Comparisons are made with the election results for the year when the sitting councillor was elected, although boundary changes make these comparisons of limited use.

=== Abercromby ===
Abercromby - 3 seats
Party	Candidate	Votes	%	±%
Labour	H. Livermore *	3,300	59	−3
Labour	T. G. D. Maguire	3,130	56	
Labour	L. Murphy	3,115	55	
Conservative	J. Cheshire *	2,335	41	−10
Conservative	Abram Maxwell Caplin	2,256	40	+2
Conservative	F. J. Bullen *	2,231	40	−13
Majority		965		
Registered electors		12,845		
Turnout		5,635	44	
Labour gain from Conservative		Swing		
Labour gain from Conservative		Swing		
Labour hold		Swing		

=== Aigburth ===
Aigburth - 3 seats
Party	Candidate	Votes	%	±%
Conservative	H. M. Allen *	5,578	89%	+6%
Conservative	W. A. Kinnear *	5,551	89%	+13%
Conservative	G. S. Fulton ^{(PARTY)}	5,437	87%	+6%
Labour	W. Rice-Jones	680	11%	−3%
Labour	T. G. White	609	10%	−4%
Labour	R. Hunter	567	9%	−5%
Majority		4,898		
Registered electors		14,022		
Turnout		6,258	45%	0%
Conservative hold		Swing		
Conservative hold		Swing		
Conservative hold		Swing		

=== Allerton ===
Allerton - 3 seats
Party	Candidate	Votes	%	±%
Conservative	C. Haswell *	3,199	81%	+7%
Conservative	Mrs. M. J. Strong *	3,137	79%	+3%
Conservative	J. McMillan *	3,124	79%	
Labour	B. Deane	759	19%	−7%
Labour	A.Dunford	742	19%	−7%
Labour	G. M. Scott	675	17%	−9%
Majority		2,440		
Registered electors		9,742		
Turnout		3,958	41%	+1%
Conservative hold		Swing		
Conservative hold		Swing		
Conservative hold		Swing		

=== Anfield ===
Anfield - 3 seats
Party	Candidate	Votes	%	±%
Conservative	R. F. Craine ^{(PARTY)}	4,935	64%	−5%
Conservative	A. J. White *	4,818	63%	−5%
Conservative	N. A. Pannell *	4,796	62%	+9%
Labour	G. McCartney	2,756	36%	−11%
Labour	W. K. Fox	2,755	36%	−11%
Labour	R. G. Bale	2,741	36%	−11%
Majority		2,179		
Registered electors		15,956		
Turnout		7,691	48%	+2%
Conservative hold		Swing		
Conservative hold		Swing		
Conservative hold		Swing		

=== Arundel ===
Arundel - 3 seats
Party	Candidate	Votes	%	±%
Conservative	W. I. Throssell *	3,782	64%	
Conservative	H. Lees *	3,714	63%	
Conservative	J. N. M. Entwistle *	3,627	61%	
Labour	A. Young	2,133	36%	
Labour	T. McManus	2,113	36%	
Labour	E. M. Mannheim	2,085	35%	
Majority		1,649		
Registered electors		13,355		
Turnout		5,915	44%	
Conservative hold		Swing		
Conservative hold		Swing		
Conservative hold		Swing		

The successful candidates for Arundel were previously elected for the Sefton Park East wards under the previous ward boundaries in 1950, 1951 and 1952.

=== Breckfield ===
Breckfield - 3 seats
Party	Candidate	Votes	%	±%
Conservative	S. Curtis ^{(PARTY)}	2,973	52%	
Conservative	W. B. Pickett ^{(PARTY)}	2,923	51%	
Conservative	J. S. Ross	2,848	50%	
Labour	W. R. Snell *	2,743	48%	−7%
Labour	A. T. F. Williams	2,668	47%	
Labour	J. Cullen	2,639	46%	
Majority		230		
Registered electors		12,697		
Turnout		5,716	45%	+1%
Conservative hold		Swing		
Conservative hold		Swing		
Conservative gain from Labour		Swing		

=== Broadgreen ===
Broadgreen - 3 seats
Party	Candidate	Votes	%	±%
Conservative	L. H. Sanders	3,912	63%	
Conservative	L. T. Rogers	3,860	63%	
Conservative	L. S. Allen	3,773	61%	
Labour	G. Sykes	2,258	37%	
Labour	J. H. Goodenough	2,176	35%	
Labour	G. H. Dunbar	2,143	35%	
Majority		1,654		
Registered electors		12,700		
Turnout		6,170	49%	
Conservative hold		Swing		
Conservative hold		Swing		
Conservative hold		Swing		

=== Central ===
Central - 3 seats
Party	Candidate	Votes	%	±%
Labour	Mrs. E. M. Braddock	3,008	40%	
Labour	J. Cullen	2,951	39%	
Labour	W. McKeown	2,805	37%	
Independent	J. G. Granby	2,339	31%	
Conservative	J. O. Tiernan	2,139	29%	
Independent	J. Larkin	2,075	28%	
Majority		869		
Registered electors		10,799		
Turnout		7,486	69%	
Labour hold		Swing		
Labour hold		Swing		
Labour hold		Swing		

=== Childwall ===
Childwall- 3 seats
Party	Candidate	Votes	%	±%
Conservative	W.J.Sergent *	4,916	85%	+6%
Conservative	A. Young *	4,901	85%	−1%
Conservative	J. S. Brown *	4,878	85%	+1%
Labour	A. J. Keeley	851	15%	−6%
Labour	J. O'Brien	847	15%	−6%
Labour	J. Fraser	846	15%	−6%
Majority		4,065		
Registered electors		13,946		
Turnout		5,767	41%	−1%
Conservative hold		Swing		
Conservative hold		Swing		
Conservative hold		Swing		

=== Church ===
Church - 3 seats
Party	Candidate	Votes	%	±%
Conservative	Mrs.E.B.Glazebrook	5,280	83%	
Conservative	E. Jennings	5,244	82%	
Conservative	H. M. Steward	5,069	79%	
Labour	W. Smyth	1,100	17%	
Labour	W. J. Wright	1,050	16%	
Labour	G. W. Clarke	999	16%	
Majority		4,180		
Registered electors		14,740		
Turnout		6,380	43%	
Conservative hold		Swing		
Conservative hold		Swing		
Conservative hold		Swing		

=== Clubmoor ===
Clubmoor - 3 seats
Party	Candidate	Votes	%	±%
Conservative	L. J. Carr	3,502	54%	
Conservative	N. A. Williams	3.439	53%	
Conservative	F.H.Wilson	3,397	53%	
Labour	A. C. McLeod	2,967	46%	
Labour	M. James	2,887	45%	
Labour	H. F. Welsh	2,826	44%	
Majority		535		
Registered electors		12,876		
Turnout		6,469	50%	
Conservative hold		Swing		
Conservative hold		Swing		
Conservative hold		Swing		

=== County ===
County - 3 seats
Party	Candidate	Votes	%	±%
Conservative	Mrs. M. E. Jones	4,188	51%	
Conservative	G.Moore	4,045	49%	
Labour	H. Dailey	4,003	49%	
Labour	R. Stoddart	3,994	49%	
Conservative	R. Andrews	3,982	49%	
Labour	J. A. B. Deane	3,900	48%	
Majority				
Registered electors		15,702		
Turnout		8,191	52%	
Conservative hold		Swing		
Conservative hold		Swing		
Labour hold		Swing		

=== Croxteth ===
Croxteth - 3 seats
Party	Candidate	Votes	%	±%
Conservative	N. A. Williams	4,391	77%	+27%
Conservative	T. H. Thompson	4,332	76%	
Conservative	J. G. Hughes	4,215	74%	
Labour	N. Smith	1,301	23%	
Labour	E.Maguire	1,195	21%	
Labour	W.A.Robinson	1,194	21%	
Majority		3,090		
Registered electors		10,258		
Turnout		5,692	55%	+10%
Conservative hold		Swing		
Conservative hold		Swing		
Conservative gain from Labour		Swing		

=== Dingle ===
Dingle - 3 seats
Party	Candidate	Votes	%	±%
Labour	W. F. Aldis *	5,059	60%	−5%
Labour	F. H. Cain ^{(PARTY)}	4,627	55%	−10%
Labour	L. C. Edwards	4,519	54%	−11%
Conservative	S. Airey *	3,347	40%	−11%
Conservative	H. B. Allison	3,338	40%	+5%
Conservative	E. Johnson	2,953	35%	0%
Majority		1,712		
Registered electors		15,438		
Turnout		8,406	54%	+1%
Labour hold		Swing		
Labour gain from Conservative		Swing		
Labour hold		Swing		

=== Dovecot ===
Dovecot - 3 seats
Party	Candidate	Votes	%	±%
Labour	W. P. Johnson	4,232	58%	
Labour	T. H. Maloney	4,216	58%	
Labour	L. Caplan	4,153	57%	
Conservative	Sydney Smart	3,006	42%	
Conservative	J. P. Moyses	2,969	41%	
Conservative	D. E. Williams	2,947	41%	
Majority		1,226		
Registered electors		15,171		
Turnout		7,238	48%	

=== Everton ===
Everton - 3 seats
Party	Candidate	Votes	%	±%
Labour	J. B. Braddock *	3,767	71%	+13%
Labour	J. L. Hughes *	3,753	71%	−6%
Labour	D. Nickson *	3,591	68%	+4%
Conservative	A. W. Carter	1,502	29%	
Conservative	W. Martin	1,409	27%	
Conservative	E. D. Minshull	1,375	26%	
Majority		2,265		
Registered electors		13,443		
Turnout		5,269	39%	+1%
Labour hold		Swing		
Labour hold		Swing		
Labour hold		Swing		

=== Fairfield ===
Fairfield- 3 seats
Party	Candidate	Votes	%	±%
Conservative	R. Meadows *	4,079	57%	−8%
Conservative	R. Nash *	3,959	55%	−12%
Conservative	W. Thomas *	3,910	54%	−1%
Labour	H. Lee	3,123	43%	−2%
Labour	J. M. Campbell	3,109	43%	−2%
Labour	N. Beresford	3,034	42%	−3%
Majority		956		
Registered electors		15,611		
Turnout		7,202	46%	+6%
Conservative hold		Swing		
Conservative hold		Swing		
Conservative hold		Swing		

=== Fazakerley ===
Fazakerley - 3 seats
Party	Candidate	Votes	%	±%
Conservative	K. P. Thompson *	4,100	58%	
Conservative	R. Poole	4,079	57%	
Conservative	R. Rattray	4,026	56%	
Labour	E. Jarvis	3,027	42%	
Labour	T. McNerney	2,987	42%	
Labour	J. H. Sommerville	2,870	40%	
Majority		1,073		
Registered electors		13,112		
Turnout		7,127	54%	
Conservative gain from Labour		Swing		
Conservative hold		Swing		
Conservative gain from Labour		Swing		

=== Gillmoss ===
Gillmoss - 3 seats
Party	Candidate	Votes	%	±%
Labour	C. McDonald	4,000	65%	
Labour	J. Troy	3,805	62%	
Labour	I. I. Levin	3,784	61%	
Conservative	L. J. H. Rumsey	2,165	35%	
Conservative	H. M. Dobie	2,143	35%	
Conservative	W. A, Cliffe	2,100	34%	
Majority		1,835		
Registered electors		14,074		
Turnout		6,165	44%	

=== Granby ===
Granby - 3 seats
Party	Candidate	Votes	%	±%
Labour	Mrs. E. Trainor	3,270	55%	
Labour	W. T. Brodie *	3,244	55%	
Labour	J. Guinan	3,185	54%	−7%
Conservative	R. J. McLaughlin	2,639	45%	
Conservative	J. E. Thompson *	2,570	43%	−12%
Conservative	T. Beattie-Edwards	2,352	40%	
Majority		631		
Registered electors		12,754		
Turnout		5,909	46%	+2%
Labour hold		Swing		
Labour gain from Conservative		Swing		
Labour gain from Conservative		Swing		

=== Kensington ===
Kensington - 3 seats
Party	Candidate	Votes	%	±%
Labour	F. Walker *	3,552	55%	−4%
Labour	Mrs. E. M. Wormald	3,400	52%	
Labour	T. K. Williams	3,395	52%	
Conservative	S. Minion *	2,951	45%	−9%
Conservative	H. W. Hughes *	2,947	45%	−6%
Conservative	A. E. Holloway	2,781	43%	
Majority		601		
Registered electors		13,799		
Turnout		6,503	47%	+3%
Labour hold		Swing		
Labour gain from Conservative		Swing		
Labour gain from Conservative		Swing		

=== Low Hill ===
Low Hill - 3 seats
Party	Candidate	Votes	%	±%
Labour	F. Robinson *	3,064	54%	−11%
Labour	Mrs. M. J. Powell ^{(PARTY)}	2,950	52%	−13%
Labour	J. M. Taylor	2,923	51%	−14%
Conservative	G. Dugdale ^{(PARTY)}	2,010	35%	−20%
Conservative	W. A. Cassidy	2,003	35%	0%
Conservative	G. P. Brewer	1,878	33%	−2%
Ind. Conservative	Mrs. M. Brook	648	11%	
Majority		1,054		
Registered electors		11,501		
Turnout		5,772	50%	+6%
Labour hold		Swing		
Labour gain from Conservative		Swing		
Labour hold		Swing		

=== Melrose ===
Melrose - 3 seats
Party	Candidate	Votes	%	±%
Labour	P. J. O'Hare	3,000	65%	
Labour	H. James	2,719	59%	
Labour	C. H. Browne	2,691	59%	
Conservative	J. A. Fergus	1,588	35%	
Conservative	J. Smith	1,576	34%	
Conservative	F. Rhind	1,532	33%	
Majority		1,412		
Registered electors		10,956		
Turnout		4,588	42%	

=== Netherfield ===
Netherfield - 3 seats
Party	Candidate	Votes	%	±%
Protestant	J. Dorman	2,237	55%	
Protestant	G. E. Lewis *	2,198	54%	−13%
Conservative and Protestant	H. V. Shaw *	2,125	52%	−10%
Labour	R. Clitherow '*	1,831	45%	−10%
Labour	T. Robinson	1,743	44%	−11%
Labour	J. J. Brayton	1,664	41%	−14%
Majority		406		
Registered electors		10,129		
Turnout		4,068	40%	+6%
Protestant gain from Labour		Swing		
Protestant hold		Swing		
Protestant hold		Swing		

=== Old Swan ===
Old Swan- 3 seats
Party	Candidate	Votes	%	±%
Conservative	A. N. Bates *	3,966	50.5%	−20%
Conservative	B. M. Frazer ^{(PARTY)}	3,921	49.9%	−4%
Labour	J. G. Devine	3,892	49.5%	+4%
Conservative	C. J. Hill ^{(PARTY)}	3,863	49.2%	−5%
Labour	J. Mooney	3,830	48.7%	+3%
Labour	J. Tudor	3,763	47.9%	+3%
Majority		74		
Registered electors		16,872		
Turnout		7,858	47%	+7%
Conservative hold		Swing		
Conservative hold		Swing		
Labour gain from Conservative		Swing		

=== Picton ===
Picton - 3 seats
Party	Candidate	Votes	%	±%
Labour	C. J. Minton	4,181	53%	
Labour	F. Burke	3,989	51%	
Labour	R. E. Jackson	3,964	51%	
Conservative	J. Keenan	3,656	47%	
Conservative	J. N. Rutter	3,518	45%	
Conservative	G. F. Allanson	3,496	45%	
Majority		525		
Registered electors		15,567		
Turnout		7,837	50%	

=== Pirrie ===
Pirrie - 3 seats
Party	Candidate	Votes	%	±%
Labour	H. Dalton	5,315	58%	
Labour	J. Morgan	5,311	57%	
Labour	W. Dalgarno	5,223	57%	
Conservative	G. Clark	3,923	42%	
Conservative	Mrs. F. M. James	3,917	42%	
Conservative	W. A. Sawle	3,881	42%	
Majority		1,392		
Registered electors		17,708		
Turnout		9,238	52%	

=== Prince's Park ===
Prince's Park - 3 seats
Party	Candidate	Votes	%	±%
Labour	J. Sidwell ^{(PARTY)}	3,647	52%	−7%
Labour	T. C. Greenwood	3,637	52%	−7%
Labour	T. Roberts	3,576	51%	−8%
Conservative	C. A. Lever	3,351	48%	+7%
Conservative	C. Cowlin *	3,305	47%	−9%
Conservative	W. Browne *	3,227	46%	−8%
Majority		296		
Registered electors		14,614		
Turnout		6,998	48%	+2%
Labour hold		Swing		
Labour gain from Conservative		Swing		
Labour gain from Conservative		Swing		

=== Sandhills ===
Sandhills - 3 seats
Party	Candidate	Votes	%	±%
Labour	P. McKernan *	3,038	80%	
Labour	S. Part *	2,825	74%	+18%
Labour	H. Aldritt *	2,727	72%	−7%
Conservative	J. McQuade	757	20%	
Majority		2,281		
Registered electors		9,978		
Turnout		3,795	38%	0%
Labour hold		Swing		
Labour hold		Swing		
Labour hold		Swing		

=== St. Domingo ===
St. Domingo - 3 seats
Party	Candidate	Votes	%	±%
Labour	F. Keating	3,206	53%	+4%
Labour	J. Gardner	3,117	51%	+2%
Labour	W. R. Maylor	2,992	49%	0%
Protestant	Mrs. M. J. Longbottom *	2,853	47%	−18%
Protestant	R. F. Henderson ^{(PARTY)}	2,846	47%	−4%
Protestant	W. H. Wilkes ^{(PARTY)}	2,702	45%	−6%
Majority		353		
Registered electors		13,279		
Turnout		6,059	46%	+10%
Labour gain from Protestant		Swing		
Labour gain from Protestant		Swing		
Labour gain from Protestant		Swing		

=== St. James ===
St. James' - 3 seats
Party	Candidate	Votes	%	±%
Labour	H. Carr	3,662	70%	
Labour	Mrs. E. E. Gough	3,634	69%	
Labour	W. G. Ingham	3,403	65%	
Conservative	R. S. Fairclough	1,598	30%	
Conservative	J. E. Kendrick	1,326	25%	
Conservative	K. John	1,301	25%	
Majority		2,064		
Registered electors		11,931		
Turnout		5,260	44%	
Labour gain from Conservative		Swing		

=== St. Mary's ===
St. Mary's - 3 seats
Party	Candidate	Votes	%	±%
Labour	E. C. Pimlett	3,115	51%	
Labour	S. R. Maddox	3,059	50%	
Labour	W. J. Thompson	3,004	49%	
Conservative	J. Richard's	2,709	44%	
Conservative	H. Clarke	2,684	44%	
Conservative	H. B. Fairclough	2,492	40%	
Majority		406		
Registered electors		12,241		
Turnout		6,165	50%	

=== St. Michael's ===
St. Michael's - 3 seats
Party	Candidate	Votes	%	±%
Conservative	A. B. Collins *	3,759	72%	
Conservative	G. W. Pickles *	3,756	72%	−4%
Conservative	F. Bidston *	3,650	70%	−5%
Labour	F. Chadwick	1,464	28%	−8%
Labour	K. Chowley	1,393	27%	−9%
Labour	Mrs. E. E. Wright	1,379	26%	−10%
Majority		2,295		
Registered electors		10,847		
Turnout		5,223	48%	−4%
Labour hold		Swing		
Labour hold		Swing		
Labour hold		Swing		

Comparisons with former Sefton Park West ward.

=== Smithdown ===
Smithdown - 3 seats
Party	Candidate	Votes	%	±%
Labour	L. Holden *	3,372	64%	−1%
Labour	J. Johnstone *	3,332	64%	−3%
Labour	W. Gibbs	3,194	61%	−6%
Conservative	F. W. Holland	1,860	36%	+3%
Conservative	B. S. Morgan	1,836	35%	+2%
Conservative	T. Hillock	1,835	35%	+2%
Majority		1,512		
Registered electors		13,735		
Turnout		5,232	38%	−2%
Labour hold		Swing		
Labour hold		Swing		
Labour hold		Swing		

Comparisons with former Edge Hill ward.

=== Speke ===
Speke - 3 seats
Party	Candidate	Votes	%	±%
Labour	A. Hardman *	3,543	63%	
Labour	B. Crookes *	3,436	61%	−5%
Labour	W. H. Sefton	3,201	57%	−9%
Conservative	G. Edwards ^{(PARTY)}	2,088	37%	
Conservative	L. J. Murphy	1,936	34%	
Conservative	E. Norton	1,872	33%	
Majority		1,455		
Registered electors		12,164		
Turnout		5,631	46%	−5%
Labour hold		Swing		
Labour gain from Conservative		Swing		
Labour hold		Swing		

Comparisons made with the former Garston ward.

=== Tuebrook ===
Tuebrook - 3 seats
Party	Candidate	Votes	%	±%
Conservative	J. F. Bradley	3,707	51%	
Conservative	J. E. Molyneux	3,698	51%	
Conservative	E. F. Pine	3,660	50%	
Labour	W. I. Davies	3,547	49%	
Labour	V. Burke	3,539	49%	
Labour	R. W. Counsell	3,516	48%	
Majority		160		
Registered electors		14,359		
Turnout		7,254	51%	

=== Vauxhall ===
Vauxhall - 3 seats
Party	Candidate	Votes	%	±%
Labour	E. Corrigan	2,523	71%	
Labour	D. Cowley	2,492	70%	
Labour	John Sheehan	2,410	68%	
Democratic Labour	T. Hogan *	1,013	29%	
Democratic Labour	J. O'Neill	872	25%	
Communist	R. Cuerdon	301	9%	
Majority		2,523		
Registered electors		11,956		
Turnout		3,536	30%	
Labour hold		Swing		

=== Warbreck ===
Warbreck - 3 seats
Party	Candidate	Votes	%	±%
Conservative	F. Woolfenden	4,609	62%	
Conservative	A. W. Lowe	4,571	62%	
Conservative	D. F. Brady	4,484	61%	
Labour	J. Murphy	2,781	38%	
Labour	A. Hardisty	2,752	37%	
Labour	C. A. Keech	2,692	36%	
Majority		1,828		
Registered electors		14,418		
Turnout		7,390	51%	
Labour gain from Conservative		Swing		

=== Westminster ===
Westminster - 3 seats
Party	Candidate	Votes	%	±%
Labour	J. Hamilton	2,300	53%	
Labour	F. Murphy	2,296	53%	
Labour	R. J. Alcock	2,219	52%	
Conservative	E. Shaw	2,006	47%	
Conservative	S. E. Goldsmith	1,867	43%	
Conservative	A. G. Cleather	1,865	43%	
Majority		294		
Registered electors		8,739		
Turnout		4,306	49%	
Labour gain from Conservative		Swing		

=== Woolton ===
Woolton - 3 seats
Party	Candidate	Votes	%	±%
Conservative	G. F. Caitlin	4,161	68%	
Conservative	J. Norton	4,128	67%	
Conservative	J. B. Smart	4,096	67%	
Labour	Mrs. R. M. Checkett	1,963	32%	
Labour	T. Churchill	1,958	32%	
Labour	I. Cocker	1,904	31%	
Majority		2,198		
Registered electors		11,679		
Turnout		6,124	52%	

== By-elections ==
=== Abercromby, Wednesday 30 September 1953 ===
Cllr. Thomas George Dominic Maguire (Abercromby, Labour) died on 24 August 1953

Abercromby
Party	Candidate	Votes	%	±%
Labour	Kenneth Walter Counsell	2,493		
Conservative	Reginald John McLaughlin	1,852		
Majority				
Registered electors		12,845		
Turnout				
Labour hold		Swing		

=== Vauxhall, Thursday 19 November 1953 ===
Two vacancies in the Vauxhall ward were created by the death of Alderman Bertie Victor Kirby C.B.E. D.C.M. on 1 September 1953, Cllr. John Sheehan was elected as Alderman by the City Council on 7 October 1953 and assigned as Returning Officer for the Granby ward. and the resignation of Cllr. Edward Corrigan.

Vauxhall - 2 seats
Party	Candidate	Votes	%	±%
Labour	Anthony Dunford	2,018		
Labour	Joseph Cyril Brady	2,049		
Communist	Richard Cuerdon	140		
Majority				
Registered electors		11,956		
Turnout				
Labour hold		Swing		
Labour hold		Swing		

=== Allerton, Thursday 17 December 1953 ===
A vacancy in the Allerton ward was created by the death of Cllr. Margaret Jane Strong (Conservative, Allerton) on 11 November 1953.

Allerton - 3 seats
Party	Candidate	Votes	%	±%
Conservative	Stephen Minion	1,594		
Labour	Vincent Burke	282		
Majority				
Registered electors		9,742		
Turnout				
Conservative hold		Swing		
