= Egerton Smith =

British newspaper publisher, editor (1774–1841)

Egerton Smith (19 June 1774 – 18 November 1841) was a Liverpool publisher, founder of the Liverpool Mercury.

== Biography ==
Egerton Smith was the son of Egerton Smith the elder (died 1788) and Ann Prescott. He joined his mother and then his brother in the family firm, making navigational instruments, and took out a patent for one invention in 1809. However, he increasingly turned towards printing and publishing. He founded the Liverpool Mercury newspaper in 1811, and a weekly magazine, The Kaleidoscope, in 1818. Smith was also active in founding mechanics institutes and became a well-known local philanthropist.

He was one of the founders of the Strangers' Friend Society, a local charity which helped the poor at their homes.

His grandson was Egerton Smith Castle F.S.A., an author, antiquarian, and swordsman, and an early practitioner of reconstructed historical fencing.

== Animal welfare ==
Smith authored an early book supportive of animal welfare. It was first published in an anthology of prose and verse, The Melange, in 1834. It was published separately as The Elysium of Animals: A Dream in 1836. The Monthly Review for 1836 commented:

That the author has succeeded in his endeavour to exhibit to the reader the odious character of wanton severity towards the lower animals, in a more forcible light than the common observer would discover for himself we admit. He has also put the subject upon such a ground, and treated it in such a shape as will naturally arouse the attention of the young, and the unreflecting. At the same time, we feel that he sometimes pitches his appeals too high, and that thereby he has run the risk of defeating the very object he had in view. For instance – and we care not by what human authority he backs his conjecture – it seems to us quite unnecessary, in pleading in behalf of the inferior animals, to suppose that they may enjoy a future state of existence.

== Selected publications ==
- The Melange (1834)
- The Elysium of Animals: A Dream (1836)
