= Numbers 11-13 Wolstenholme Square =

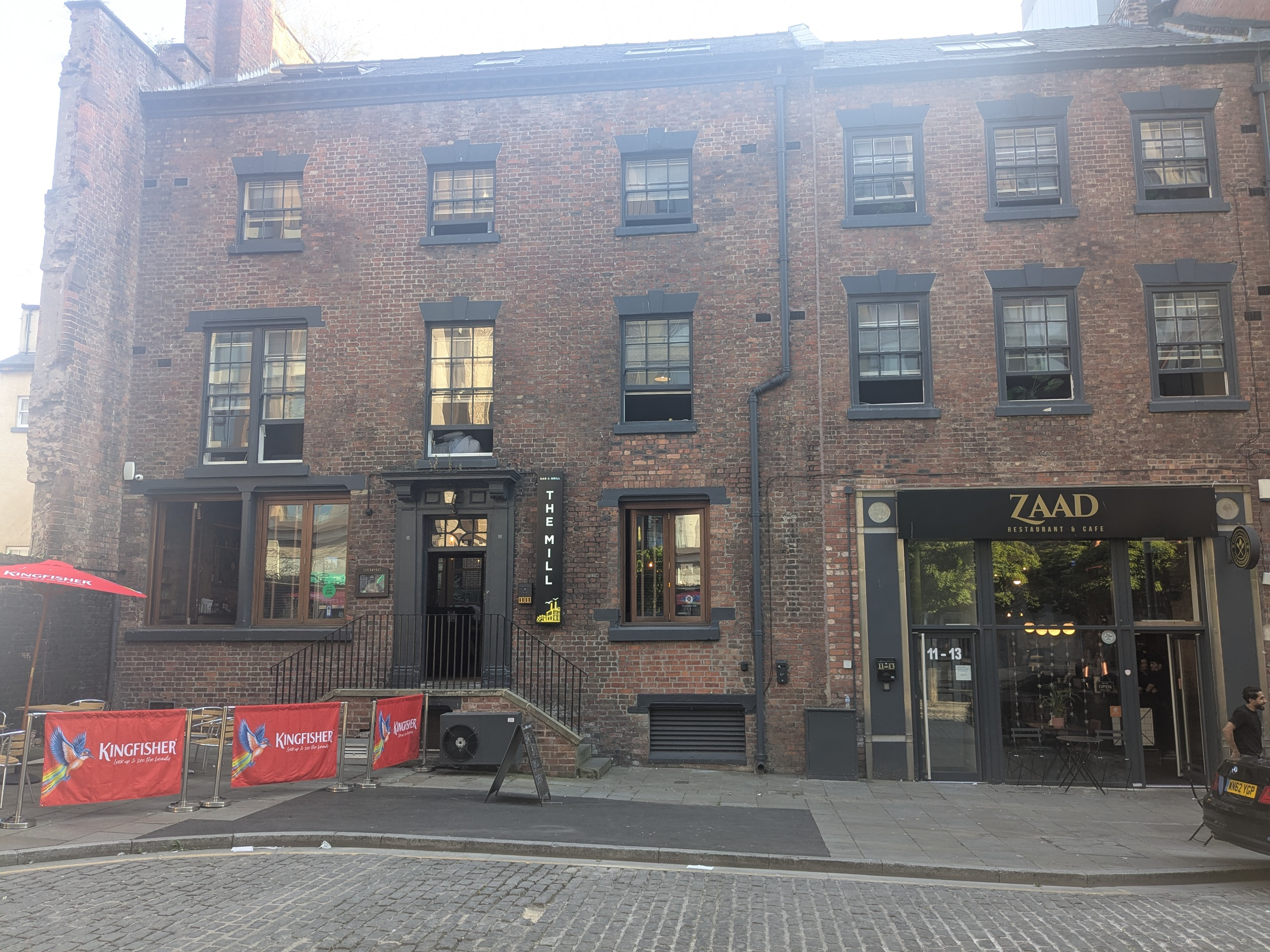
11-13 Wolstenholme Square

Numbers 11-13 Wolstenholme Square is a building in Liverpool, U.K. It dates from 1765, when the south side of the square was developed for prosperous merchants. Numbers 11-13 are the last surviving Georgian buildings in Wolstenholme Square.

== History ==
As Liverpool's wealthier residents moved farther afield, the square lost its fashionable residential character and was increasingly occupied by tradespeople, workshops and warehouses. By the mid-nineteenth century, the premises were in mixed commercial and residential use, accommodating trades and lodging.

Wolstenholme Creative Space used the spaces between 2009 and 2012. Several sources discussing the creative space state that the property was once the residence of the first Mayor of the City of Liverpool, although this has not been independently confirmed. From at least 1873, numbers 11-13 were occupied by John Hall & Sons, a firm of wool merchants, which was still listed there in 1904. By 1947, the firm's former premises were being used by the Customs and Excise Department as a King's warehouse.

By the late 1980s, amid Liverpool's wider post-industrial decline, many of the square's buildings were run-down or abandoned. The ownership of property in the surrounding Ropewalks district also changed during this period. At the end of March 1988, Liverpool City Council sold a group of properties to Charterhouse. After Charterhouse entered receivership in 1992, the properties were acquired by Frenson Properties, which remained a major landowner in the Ropewalks into the early 2010s.
