= William Smyth (historian) =

English poet and historian

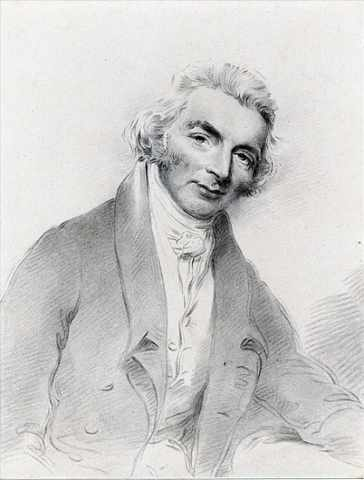
William Smyth by Joseph Slater

William Smyth (1765 in Liverpool – 24 June 1849 in Norwich) was an English poet and historian, who became Regius Professor at Cambridge in 1807.

== Life ==
The son of merchant-banker Thomas Smyth, he was born in Liverpool. After attending a day school in the town, he went to Eton College, where he remained three years. On leaving Eton he read with a tutor at Bury, Lancashire, and in January 1783 he entered Peterhouse, Cambridge., graduating eighth wrangler in 1787. In the same year, he was elected to the fellowship vacated by John Wilson. He proceeded to the M.A. in 1790, and returned to Liverpool, but in 1793, after the declaration of war with France, his father's bank failed, and it became necessary for him to earn his living.

Through Edward Morris, a college friend, Smyth was chosen in 1793 by Richard Brinsley Sheridan as tutor to his elder son Thomas. He lived with his pupil at Wanstead, at Bognor, and at Cambridge, and saw much of Sheridan himself; but the relationship was troublesome both personally and financially. When Smyth accompanied his pupil to Cambridge in 1803, he received bills on the Drury Lane Theatre for his expenses. In 1806 Thomas went into the army, and Smyth became tutor of Peterhouse.

In 1807, on the recommendation of his political friends, Smyth was appointed Regius Professor of Modern History, a post he kept until his death. In 1825 he inherited property, and, in accordance with the college statutes then in force, his fellowship was declared vacant. He continued, however, to occupy his rooms in college, until in 1847 he retired to Norwich, where he died, unmarried, on 24 June 1849. He was buried in Norwich Cathedral, where there is a stained-glass window to his memory over his grave.

== Legacy ==
The two stained Munich windows in Peterhouse Chapel, representing the Nativity and the Ascension, were subscribed for as a memorial to him. There is a portrait of him in the hall of Peterhouse, given by his brother, the Rev. Thomas Smyth (1778–1854), fellow of Oriel College, Oxford, from 1800 to 1813, and vicar of St. Austell. This portrait is lithographed in the fifth edition of his English Lyrics, edited by his brother in 1850. The posthumous bust in the Fitzwilliam Museum, by E. H. Baily, is copied from the picture.

== Works ==
- A List of Books Recommended (1817; 2nd ed. 1828)
- Memoir of Sheridan (1840) (privately printed).
- Lectures on Modern History (2 vols.) (1840-181); dedicated to Henry Petty, 3rd Marquess of Lansdowne; revised by Adam Sedgwick. vol. 1 vol. 2
- Lectures on the French Revolution (3 vols.) (1840-1841) vol. 1 Breaks new ground. Both sets of lectures were reissued with author's corrections in Bohn's Standard Library (1855).

Smyth wrote much verse, and his English Lyrics, published in 1797, which were praised by the Edinburgh Review, ran through five editions. Thomas Moore's opinion of them was less favorable: he accused Smyth of appropriating his metres and parodying his songs. Smyth contributed some of the words to Clarke Whitfield's Twelve Vocal Songs, and wrote the ode for the installation of Prince William Frederick as chancellor of the university.

Smyth devoted his last years to a work on the Evidences of Christianity.’

Smyth is "the Professor" in Reminiscences of Thought and Feeling by Mary Ann Kelty.

== Notes ==
Attribution

This article incorporates text from a publication now in the public domain: "Smyth, William (1765-1849)". Dictionary of National Biography. London: Smith, Elder & Co. 1885–1900.
