= Thomas Smyth (merchant) =

Thomas Smyth (1737? – 1824) was an English merchant, banker and Lord Mayor of Liverpool.

== Life ==
He was son of Thomas Smyth of the Middle Temple, the sixth son of Bishop Thomas Smyth.

Smyth was partner with Charles Caldwell in Charles Caldwell & Co., a Liverpool bank. He became a shareholder (holding joint with Caldwell) in the Macclesfield Copper Company, known as Roe and Co. after its founder Charles Roe, in 1774.

Smyth was a lessee on behalf of Roe and Co. of land near Llandudno from Lord Penrhyn, by an agreement of 1785. On 12 October 1788 Lord Penrhyn visited Merseyside, riding the liberties of the borough of Sefton, and Smyth accompanied him. The occasion was seen as largely political and symbolic, part of the contest between Lord Penrhyn, whose title was in the Peerage of Ireland and who was the sitting Member of Parliament for Liverpool at the time, and Banastre Tarleton.

Smyth was Lord Mayor of Liverpool in 1789–1790. An important issue for Liverpool Corporation at the period was the development of Liverpool Docks. Smyth undertook negotiations with Lord Sefton over a lease in the Harrington area, for planned expansion. That lease was currently held by Roe & Co. The negotiation failed, however, Lord Sefton expressing a wish not to have the area developed with labourers' houses.

The 1790 British general election fell in the summer, towards the end of Smyth's term of office. Lord Penrhyn and Bamber Gascoyne the younger were candidates posing as defenders of Liverpool's commercial interests, against abolitionists, such as Tarleton. Feelings ran high, and Smyth called a noon meeting on 16 June outside the Liverpool Exchange. He warned of violence, and attempted a straw poll by show of hands. But Tarleton had much support, and was not faced down.

Smyth's term as mayor also brought to the surface a related sharp rivalry with John Sparling, his successor the following year. Smyth manoeuvred to bring his partner Caldwell into the Corporation; in retaliation Sparling tried to bring in supporters of his own. Sparling and his bailiffs, one of whom was Clayton Tarleton (brother to Banastre Tarleton), were impugned by a comment Smyth had minuted for illegal acts. The matter went to a court case.

Smyth became bankrupt in 1793, when the bank failed, hit by the fall in the price of cotton at the outbreak of the French Revolutionary Wars. Losing most of his possessions, Smyth was able to remain at Fair View, Toxteth Park, by arrangement with his landlord William Roe, son of Charles Roe. An estate in Macclesfield, that had come through his wife, remained unaffected. The impact in Liverpool of the failure of Charles Caldwell & Co. was serious on business confidence, and there was a failed attempt to obtain a loan from the Bank of England. The Corporation resolved the financial crisis by an Act of Parliament allowing it to issue banknotes.

Smyth died, aged 87, at Fence House in Macclesfield, on 12 July 1824.

== Family ==
Smyth married Elizabeth Blagg or Blagge of Macclesfield in 1762 at Prestbury. Their children included William Smyth.
