= Nicholas Robinson (mayor) =

Mayor of Liverpool from 1828 to 1829

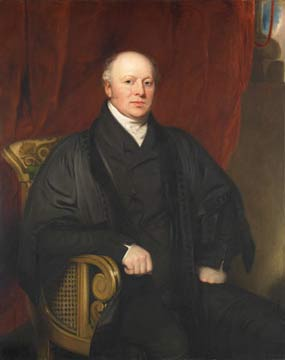
Nicholas Robinson by Thomas Clement Thompson

Nicholas Robinson (1769 – 1854) was Mayor of Liverpool, England, in 1828–29. He was a rich corn merchant who had paid £4500 for the land in Aigburth, Liverpool, upon which he had Sudley House built as his home around 1824. He died at Sudley on 3 or 4 February 1854 and the house then passed into the ownership of his two daughters.

Robinson was first elected to Liverpool council on 4 January 1815. He contested unsuccessfully against Thomas Colley Porter for the office of mayor in 1827, in an election that was notorious for the bribery that ensued. The situation was fuelled by the economic expansion of the city, which meant that some people were awash with money. Parliamentary historian Margaret Escott says that the 1827 mayoral election, which Porter won by 1780 votes to 1765 in a poll that lasted six days, was "the most expensive, venal and violent mayoral contest" up to that time. Porter, who was a Whig, had the support of the Liverpool Mercury while Robinson was favoured by the Corporation. Escott says that the main issues were "management of the docks, local commerce, ‘junta’ domination and proposals for a householder and property-based franchise". Votes were bought at prices ranging between £6 and £50, with the candidates spending in total around £8000-10000 each. The two sides co-operated with a subsequent inquiry that resulted in three people being prosecuted and disenfranchised for bribery. There had been 3545 voters.

William Rathbone was one of Robinson's two proposers for the mayoralty in October 1828, on which occasion his election was unopposed. Upon completion of his year as mayor, he was awarded £1200 in recompense for expenses incurred.
