= Thomas Colley Porter =

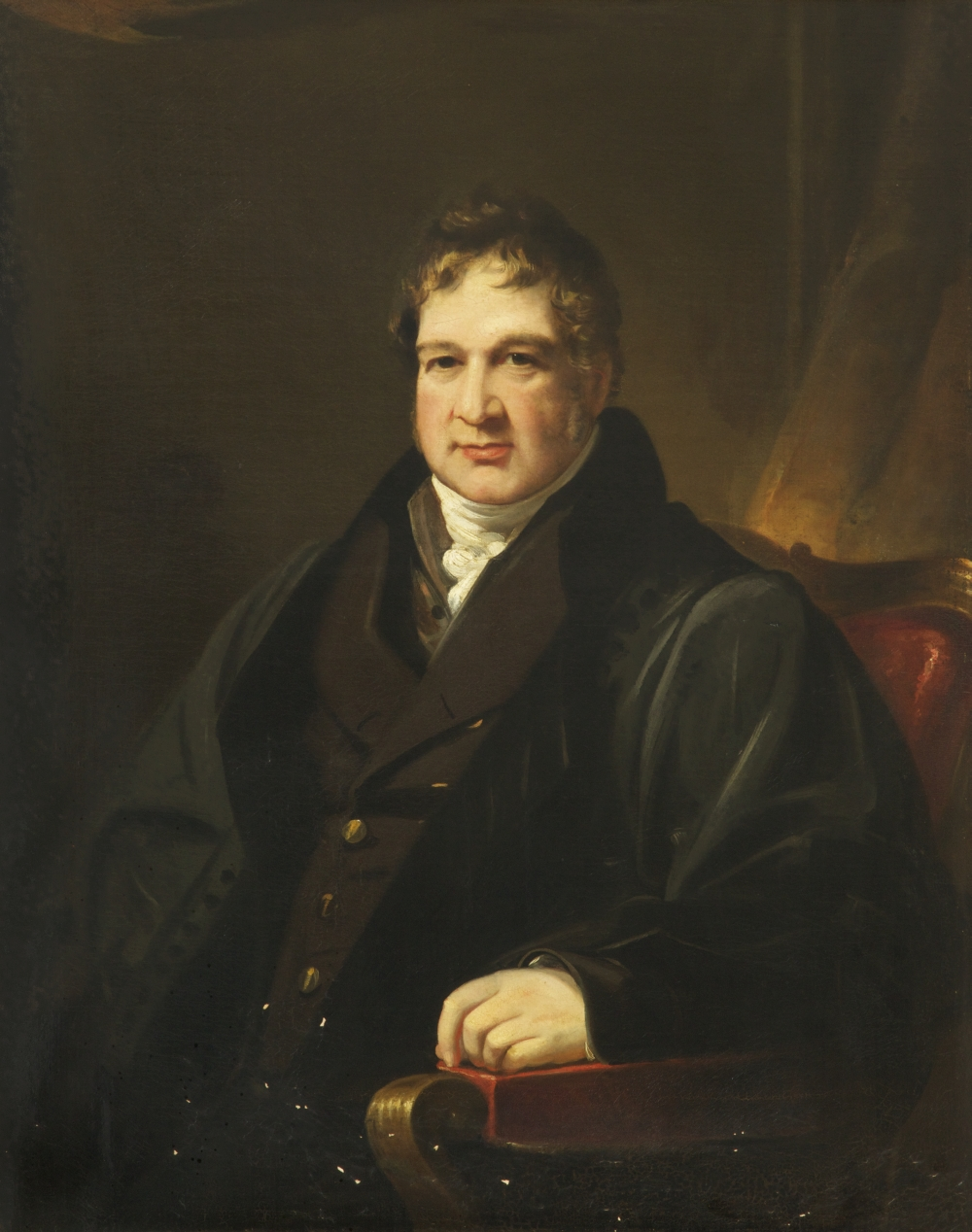
Thomas Colley Porter - 1831 painting by James Lonsdale

Thomas Colley Porter (1780 – 2 October 1833) was Mayor of Liverpool, England, from 1827 to 1828. The election, in which he defeated Nicholas Robinson, was mired by accusations of corruption.

Parliamentary historian Margaret Escott says that the 1827 mayoral election, which the plumber and painter Porter won by 1780 votes to 1765 in a poll that lasted six days, was "the most expensive, venal and violent mayoral contest" up to that time. Porter, who was a Whig, had the support of the Liverpool Mercury while Robinson, a corn merchant, was favoured by the corporation. Escott says that the main issues were "management of the docks, local commerce, ‘junta’ domination and proposals for a householder and property-based franchise". Votes were bought at prices ranging between £6 and £50, with the candidates spending in total around £8000-10000 each. The two sides co-operated with a subsequent inquiry that resulted in three people being prosecuted and disenfranchised for bribery. There had been 3545 voters and the situation was fuelled by the economic expansion of the city, which meant that some people were awash with money. Robinson was elected as mayor unopposed in the following year.

Porter Street in Liverpool was named after Thomas Porter. He had a business manufacturing white lead on Mill Lane, which later became a continuation of Great Howard Street. From 1827 until his death, he lived at a large house, variously described as being in St Anne Street and in Mansfield Street, that later became judge's lodgings. It had been constructed and briefly occupied by Samuel Sandbach, who was another mayor of Liverpool. Although not interested in politics, his oldest son, also called Thomas, married the daughter of Charles Horsfall, who was another Liverpool mayor.
