= Luke Hogan =

Lord Mayor of Liverpool, in office (1945–1946)

Luke Hogan M.B.E., J.P.

Lord Mayor of Liverpool
- In office 1945–1946
- Preceded by: The Earl of Sefton
- Succeeded by: William Gainsborough

Luke Hogan M.B.E., JP, was a Liverpool Council Labour leader who served as Lord Mayor of Liverpool.

== Biography ==
Hogan entered local politics in 1921 when he stood as a Labour candidate for Brunswick Ward. He was elected to Liverpool City Council on 1 November. He was elected as an Alderman for St. Domingo on 5 October 1927. He became the leader of the Labour group in the council in 1930 and remained in that position until 1947. He was deposed from his leadership because he opposed his party's policy of nationalising the Liverpool Cotton Exchange

He was appointed Member, Order of the British Empire in 1931 Birthday Honours. He served as Lord Mayor of Liverpool from 1945 to 1946. He was honoured with the Freedom of City of Liverpool on 1 May 1946.

== See also ==
- 1921 Liverpool City Council election
- 1926 Liverpool City Council election - Aldermanic Election
- Liverpool City Council elections 1880–present
- List of Freemen of the City of Liverpool
- Mayors and Lord Mayors of Liverpool 1207 to present
