= 1954 Liverpool City Council election =

1954 UK local election

← 1953	13 May 1954	1955 →
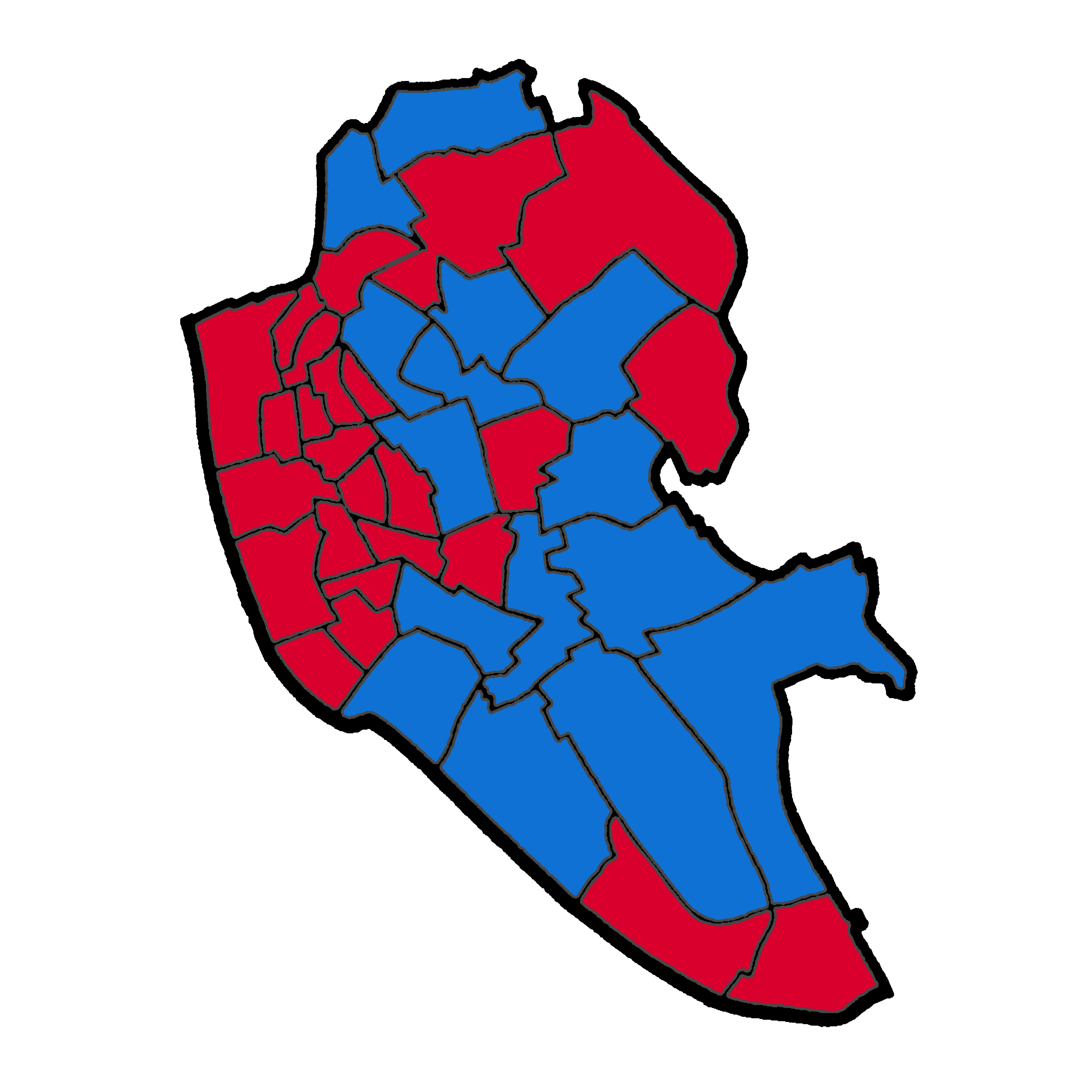
- Map of Liverpool showing wards won (first placed party)

Elections to Liverpool City Council were held on 13 May 1954. After the election, the composition of the council was:

Party	Councillors	±	Aldermen	Total
Conservative	51	-2	28	79
Labour	67	-2	7	74
Protestant	2	0	1	3
Liberal	0	0	2	2
Independent	0	0	2	2

== Election result ==
Liverpool local election result 1954
Party	Seats	Gains	Losses	Net gain/loss	Seats %	Votes %	Votes	+/−
Conservative	15	0	0	0	37.5%	47%	101,696	
Labour	25	0	0	0	62.5%	51%	111,013	
Liberal	0	0	0	0	0%	0.15%	322	
Protestant	0	0	0	0	0%	0.73%	1,578	
Communist	0	0	0	0	0%	0.18%	386	

== Ward results ==
* - Councillor seeking re-election

^{(PARTY)} - Party of former Councillor

The Councillors seeking re-election at this election were elected in the all up election in 1953 (following boundary changes) with the third highest number of votes in each ward for a one year term, therefore comparisons are made with the 1953 election results.

=== Abercromby ===
Abercromby
Party	Candidate	Votes	%	±%
Labour	L. Murphy *	3,057	66%	+11%
Conservative	H. M. Dobbie	1,590	34%	−6%
Majority		1,467		
Registered electors		12,687		
Turnout		4,647	37%	−7%
Labour hold		Swing	11%	

=== Aigburth ===
Aigburth
Party	Candidate	Votes	%	±%
Conservative	G. S. Fulton *	5,069	89%	+2%
Labour	K. A. Holland	632	11%	+2%
Majority		4,437		
Registered electors		14,058		
Turnout		5,701	41%	−4%
Conservative hold		Swing	+6%	

=== Allerton ===
Allerton
Party	Candidate	Votes	%	±%
Conservative	J. McMillan *	2,985	80%	+1%
Labour	Mrs. P. H. Henley	736	20%	+3%
Majority		2,249		
Registered electors		10,182		
Turnout		3,721	37%	−4%
Conservative hold		Swing		

=== Anfield ===
Anfield
Party	Candidate	Votes	%	±%
Conservative	N. A. Pannell *	4,226	59%	−3%
Labour	E. Burke	2,979	41%	+5%
Majority		1,247		
Registered electors		16,659		
Turnout		7,205	46%	−2%
Conservative hold		Swing		

=== Arundel ===
Arundel
Party	Candidate	Votes	%	±%
Conservative	J. N. M. Entwistle *	3,238	66%	+5%
Labour	B. Deane	1,699	34%	−1%
Majority		1,539		
Registered electors		13,276		
Turnout		4,937	37%	−7%
Conservative hold		Swing		

=== Breckfield ===
Breckfield
Party	Candidate	Votes	%	±%
Labour	J. Cullen	2,676	51%	+5%
Conservative	J. S. Ross *	2,560	49%	−1%
Majority		116		
Registered electors		12,549		
Turnout		5,236	42%	−3%
Labour hold		Swing		

=== Broadgreen ===
Broadgreen
Party	Candidate	Votes	%	±%
Conservative	J. Keenan ^{(PARTY)}	3,412	62%	+1%
Labour	G. Sykes	2,132	38%	+3%
Majority		1,280		
Registered electors		12,632		
Turnout		5,544	44%	−5%
Conservative hold		Swing		

=== Central ===
Central
Party	Candidate	Votes	%	±%
Labour	W. McKeown *	2,834	62%	+25%
Conservative	J. O. Tiernan	1,770	38%	+9%
Majority		1,064		
Registered electors		10,574		
Turnout		4,604	44%	−25%
Labour hold		Swing	+25%	

=== Childwall ===
Childwall
Party	Candidate	Votes	%	±%
Conservative	H. W. Hughes ^{(PARTY)}	4,205	87%	+2%
Labour	W. Rice-Jones	652	13%	−2%
Majority		3,553		
Registered electors		13,927		
Turnout		4,857	35%	−6%
Conservative hold		Swing		

=== Church ===
Church
Party	Candidate	Votes	%	±%
Conservative	H. M. Steward *	4,975	79%	0%
Labour	A. F. Skinner	1,340	21%	+5%
Majority		3,635		
Registered electors		14,558		
Turnout		6,315		
Conservative hold		Swing		

=== Clubmoor ===
Clubmoor
Party	Candidate	Votes	%	±%
Conservative	F. H. Wilson *	2,890	52%	−1%
Labour	A. C. McLeod	2,653	48%	+4%
Majority		273		
Registered electors		12,721		
Turnout		5,543	44%	−2%
Conservative hold		Swing		

=== County ===
County
Party	Candidate	Votes	%	±%
Labour	H. Dailey *	4,459	53%	+4%
Conservative	D. E. Williams	4,011	47%	−2%
Majority		448		
Registered electors		15,404		
Turnout		8,470	55%	+3%
Labour hold		Swing		

=== Croxteth ===
Croxteth
Party	Candidate	Votes	%	±%
Conservative	J. G. Hughes *	3,925	81%	+7%
Labour	R. H. Luke	943	19%	−2%
Majority		2,982		
Registered electors		10,133		
Turnout		4,868	48%	−7%
Conservative hold		Swing		

=== Dingle ===
Dingle
Party	Candidate	Votes	%	±%
Labour	L. C. Edwards ^{Party}	4,380	62%	+5%
Conservative	S. Airey	2,739	38%	−3%
Majority		1,641		
Registered electors		15,179		
Turnout		7,119	47%	−1%
Labour hold		Swing		

=== Dovecot ===
Dovecot
Party	Candidate	Votes	%	±%
Labour	A. L. Caplan *	3,936	61%	+4%
Conservative	S. Smart	2,536	39%	−2%
Majority		1,400		
Registered electors		15,132		
Turnout		6,472	43%	−5%
Labour hold		Swing		

=== Everton ===
Everton
Party	Candidate	Votes	%	±%
Labour	D. Nickson *	3,150	75%	+7%
Conservative	W. Martin	1,047	25%	−1%
Majority		2,103		
Registered electors		13,243		
Turnout		4,197	32%	−7%
Labour hold		Swing		

=== Fairfield ===
Fairfield
Party	Candidate	Votes	%	±%
Conservative	W. Thomas *	3,293	56%	+2%
Labour	H. Lee	2,638	44%	−2%
Majority		655		
Registered electors		15,418		
Turnout		5,931	38%	−8%
Conservative hold		Swing		

=== Fazakerley ===
Fazakerley
Party	Candidate	Votes	%	±%
Conservative	R. Rattray *	3,590	54%	−2%
Labour	R. Stoddart	3,077	46%	+6%
Majority		513		
Registered electors		12,931		
Turnout		6,667	52%	−2%
Conservative hold		Swing		

=== Gillmoss ===
Gillmoss
Party	Candidate	Votes	%	±%
Labour	I. I. Levin *	4,129	69%	+8%
Conservative	C. P. Conway	1,849	31%	−3%
Majority		2,280		
Registered electors		14,920		
Turnout		5,978	40%	−4%
Labour hold		Swing		

=== Granby ===
Granby
Party	Candidate	Votes	%	±%
Labour	J. Guinan *	2,989	62%	+8%
Conservative	E. Johnson	1,852	38%	−2%
Majority		1,137		
Registered electors		14,920		
Turnout		4,841	38%	−8%
Labour hold		Swing		

=== Kensington ===
Kensington
Party	Candidate	Votes	%	±%
Labour	T. K. Williams *	3,310	60%	+8%
Conservative	G. P. Brewer	1,852	38%	−5%
Majority		1,148		
Registered electors		13,631		
Turnout		5,472	40%	−7%
Labour hold		Swing		

=== Low Hill ===
Low Hill
Party	Candidate	Votes	%	±%
Labour	J. M. Taylor *	2,602	61%	+10%
Conservative	G. Dugdale	1,664	39%	+6%
Majority		938		
Registered electors		11,405		
Turnout		4,266	37%	−13%
Labour hold		Swing		

=== Melrose ===
Melrose
Party	Candidate	Votes	%	±%
Labour	C. H. Browne *	2,851	70%	+11%
Conservative	J. Smith	1,199	30%	−3%
Majority		1,652		
Registered electors		10,878		
Turnout		4,050	37%	−5%
Labour hold		Swing		

=== Netherfield ===
Netherfield
Party	Candidate	Votes	%	±%
Labour	T. Robinson	1,806	53%	+12%
Conservative and Protestant	G. Clark	1,578	47%	
Majority		228		
Registered electors		10,009		
Turnout		3,384	34%	−6%
Labour hold		Swing		

=== Old Swan ===
Old Swan
Party	Candidate	Votes	%	±%
Labour	J. G. Devine *	4,095	52	+2
Conservative	G. F. Allanson	3,432	44	−5
Liberal	W. Russell Dyson	322	4	
Majority		663		
Registered electors		16,690		
Turnout		7,849	47	0
Labour hold		Swing		

=== Picton ===
Picton
Party	Candidate	Votes	%	±%
Labour	R. E. Jackson *	4,121	60%	+9%
Conservative	L. J. H. Rumsay	2,763	40%	−5%
Majority		1,358		
Registered electors		15,319		
Turnout		6,884	45%	
Labour hold		Swing		

=== Pirrie ===
Pirrie
Party	Candidate	Votes	%	±%
Labour	W. Delgarn *	4,612	58%	+1%
Conservative	B. A. Ryan	3,356	42%	0%
Majority		1,256		
Registered electors		17,540		
Turnout		7,968	45%	−7%
Labour hold		Swing		

=== Prince's Park ===
Prince's Park
Party	Candidate	Votes	%	±%
Labour	T. Roberts *	3,450	58%	+6%
Conservative	C. A. Lever	2,466	42%	−5%
Majority		984		
Registered electors		14,578		
Turnout		5,916	41%	−7%
Labour hold		Swing		

=== Sandhills ===
Sandhills
Party	Candidate	Votes	%	±%
Labour	H. Alldritt *	2,926	85%	+13%
Conservative	G. J. McQuade	518	15%	−5%
Majority		2,408		
Registered electors		9,862		
Turnout		3,444	35%	−3%
Labour hold		Swing		

=== St. Domingo ===
St. Domingo
Party	Candidate	Votes	%	±%
Labour	W. R. Maylor *	3,302	59%	+10%
Protestant	Mrs. M. J. Longbottom	2,302	41%	−4%
Majority		1,000		
Registered electors		13,119		
Turnout		5,604	43%	−3%
Labour hold		Swing		

=== St. James ===
St. James
Party	Candidate	Votes	%	±%
Labour	W. G. Ingham *	3,154	77%	+12%
Conservative	J. Sharples	928	23%	−2%
Majority		2,226		
Registered electors		11,700		
Turnout		4,082	35%	−8%
Labour hold		Swing		

=== St. Mary's ===
St. Mary's
Party	Candidate	Votes	%	±%
Labour	W.J.Thompson *	3,368	57%	+8%
Conservative	J. Richards	2,503	43%	−1%
Majority		865		
Registered electors		12,169		
Turnout		5,871	48%	−2%
Labour hold		Swing		

=== St. Michael's ===
St. Michael's
Party	Candidate	Votes	%	±%
Conservative	W.Browne ^{(PARTY)}	3,444	71%	+1%
Labour	J. Cowley	1,414	29%	+3%
Majority		2,030		
Registered electors		10,673		
Turnout		4,858	46%	−2%
Conservative hold		Swing		

=== Smithdown ===
Smithdown
Party	Candidate	Votes	%	±%
Labour	W. Gibbs *	3,168	69%	+8%
Conservative	J. Moore	1,417	31%	−4%
Majority		1,751		
Registered electors		13,890		
Turnout		4,585	33%	−5%
Labour hold		Swing		

=== Speke ===
Speke
Party	Candidate	Votes	%	±%
Labour	W.H.Sefton *	3,528	72%	+15%
Conservative	L. J. Murphy	1,352	28%	−5%
Majority		2,176		
Registered electors		13,530		
Turnout		4,880	36%	−10%
Labour hold		Swing		

=== Tuebrook ===
Tuebrook
Party	Candidate	Votes	%	±%
Conservative	E. F. Pine *	3,500	52%	+2%
Labour	W. L. Davies	3,221	48%	0%
Majority		279		
Registered electors		14,141		
Turnout		6,721	48%	−3%
Conservative hold		Swing		

=== Vauxhall ===
Vauxhall
Party	Candidate	Votes	%	±%
Labour	J. C. Brady ^{(PARTY)}	2,623	98%	+30%
Communist	R. Cuerdon	64	2%	−7%
Majority		2,623		
Registered electors		11,334		
Turnout		2,687	24%	−6%
Labour hold		Swing	+30%	

=== Warbreck ===
Warbreck
Party	Candidate	Votes	%	±%
Labour	D. F. Brady *	4,070	63%	+2%
Conservative	J.Murphy	2,410	37%	+1%
Majority		1,660		
Registered electors		14,227		
Turnout		6,480	46%	−5%
Labour hold		Swing		

=== Westminster ===
Westminster
Party	Candidate	Votes	%	±%
Labour	R. J. Alcock *	2,399	60%	+8%
Conservative	E. Shaw	1,614	40%	−3%
Majority		785		
Registered electors		8,665		
Turnout		6,480	46%	−3%
Labour hold		Swing		

=== Woolton ===
Woolton
Party	Candidate	Votes	%	±%
Conservative	J. B. Smart *	3,546	69%	+2%
Labour	T. McNerney	1,562	31%	0%
Majority		1,984		
Registered electors		11,969		
Turnout		5,108	43%	−9%
Conservative hold		Swing		
