= Herbert Neville Bewley =

British lawyer and politician

Herbert Neville Bewley C.B.E., J.P.

Lord Mayor of Liverpool
- In office 1959–1960
- Preceded by: Sir Harry Livermore
- Succeeded by: John Leslie Hughes

Personal details
- Born: 14 September 1890
- Died: 12 August 1966 (aged 76)

Herbert Neville Bewley C.B.E., J.P. (1890–1966) was a British Lawyer and politician who served as Lord Mayor of Liverpool.

Bewley was born in Birkenhead, Cheshire in 1890. He was educated at Liverpool College and Wadham College, Oxford. He was elected to Liverpool City Council on 1 November 1931 as Conservative for Much Woolton Ward.

He was made a Justice of the Peace in 1944. He was appointed Commander, Order of the British Empire (C.B.E.) in the New Years Honours 1956. He lived in Crosby on Hall Road West

He served as Lord Mayor of Liverpool from 1959 to 1960.

== See also ==
- 1931 Liverpool City Council election
- Liverpool City Council elections 1880–present
- Liverpool City Council
- Mayors and Lord Mayors of Liverpool 1207 to present
