= Ethel Wormald =

British politician, educationist and social activist

Dame Ethel May Wormald DBE (née Robinson; 19 November 1901 – 23 February 1993) was a British politician, educationist and social activist. She was the second woman Lord Mayor of Liverpool. She was appointed a Dame Commander of the Order of the British Empire for her efforts.

== Biography ==
She attended Leeds University on scholarship. After graduating she married Stanley Wormald. The couple had two sons. The family relocated to Liverpool after Stanley Wormald took up employment at the Liverpool Institute.

== Political career/activism ==
She was involved the Personal Aid Society and the Socialist Educational Association. She stood in 1953 as a Labour candidate for Kensington, Liverpool. She served on the council until 1968, chairing the Education Committee from 1955–61, and from 1963–67, when she became the second woman ever to be named as Lord Mayor of Liverpool.

She became a member of the Liverpool Regional Hospital Board and, while a member, fought to create a centre for mentally ill patients who were released from local hospitals without options. A few years before her death she moved to Bethesda, Wales with her younger son, Michael Wormald, a Labour councillor in Arfon for twelve years.

== Death ==
She died at Bangor, Gwynedd on 23 February 1993, aged 91.

== Legacy ==
The Ethel Wormald College, a day school which allows older students to train as teachers without spending extra time at residential colleges.
