= John Shaw (slave trader) =

Slave trader and former mayor of Liverpool

John Shaw (1751-1830) was a slave trader and the former Mayor of Liverpool. Shaw was responsible for at least 33 slave voyages. Over half of his slaves were kidnapped from the Bight of Biafra.

Shaw was the Mayor of Liverpool twice; firstly in 1794-95 and again in 1800–1801.

Shaw used his wealth to create the Arrowe Park Estate, which subsequently became a country park.

== Sources ==
- Richardson, David (2007). Liverpool and Transatlantic Slavery. UK: Liverpool University Press. ISBN 978-1-84631-066-9.
