= Little Woolton (Liverpool ward) =

Former ward in Liverpool

Coordinates: 53.3860°N 2.8580°W

Little Woolton Ward
- Former ward
- Location within Merseyside
- OS grid reference: SJ435870
  - London: 176 mi (283 km) South
- Metropolitan borough: City of Liverpool
- Metropolitan county: Merseyside
- Region: North West
- Country: England
- Sovereign state: United Kingdom
- Post town: LIVERPOOL
- Postcode district: L25
- Dialling code: 0151
- Police: Merseyside
- Fire: Merseyside
- Ambulance: North West
- UK Parliament: Garston and Halewood

Little Woolton was a former electoral ward in Liverpool, England, historically part of Lancashire before being incorporated into the County Borough of Liverpool in 1913.

== History ==
Little Woolton ward was created to represent the historic township of Little Woolton, which was originally part of Lancashire before becoming part of Liverpool in 1913. The area remained largely rural with agricultural land and small settlements.

The ward existed as an administrative division until 1953, when it was merged with **Much Woolton ward** to form the larger **Woolton ward** as part of boundary changes within Liverpool.

== Geography ==
Little Woolton ward was located in the southeastern part of Liverpool, bordering Woolton, Gateacre, and Halewood. It was known for its open spaces, farmland, and village-like atmosphere, in contrast to the more urbanized districts of Liverpool.

== Legacy ==
Although Little Woolton ward was abolished in 1953, the name **Little Woolton** is still used informally to describe the area. It retains historical significance due to its past as an independent township before Liverpool's expansion.

== Elections ==
=== No. 34 Allerton, Childwall and Little Woolton, 4 October 1916 ===
Following the resignation of Councillor Henry Glover (Conservative, Allerton, Childwall and Little Woolton, elected 1 November 1913) which was reported to the Council on 6 September 1916, Herbert Plant Harrison was appointed by the Council in his place on 4 October 1916.

Ward	Party	Resigning Councillor	Appointed Replacement	Term expires
No. 34 Allerton, Childwall and Little Woolton	Conservative	Henry Glover	Herbert Plant Harrison	1917

=== Allerton, Childwall and Little Woolton ===
No. 34 Allerton, Childwall and Little Woolton
Party	Candidate	Votes	%	±%
Conservative	Herbert John Davis	unopposed		
Registered electors				
Conservative win (new seat)				

=== Allerton, Childwall and Little Woolton ===
No. 34 Allerton, Childwall and Little Woolton
Party	Candidate	Votes	%	±%
Conservative	Herbert John Davis	unopposed		
Registered electors				
Conservative win (new seat)				

=== Allerton, Childwall & Little Woolton ===
No. 35 Allerton
Party	Candidate	Votes	%	±%
Conservative	Stanley Rimmer	572	42%	
Liberal	Charles James Williamson	463	34%	
Labour	William Richard Blair	315	23%	
Majority		109		
Registered electors		2,202		
Turnout		1,350	61%	
Conservative hold		Swing		

=== 1922 ===
No. 39 Little Woolton
Party	Candidate	Votes	%	±%
Conservative	Rupert Henry Bremner	unopposed		
Registered electors				
Conservative win (new seat)				

=== 1925 ===
No. 39 Little Woolton
Party	Candidate	Votes	%	±%
Conservative	Rupert Henry Bremner *	267	94%	
Labour	John Henry Naylor Junr.	16	6%	
Majority		251		
Registered electors		443		
Turnout		283	64%	
Conservative hold		Swing		

=== 1928 ===
No. 39 Little Woolton
Party	Candidate	Votes	%	±%
Conservative	Rupert Henry Bremner *	unopposed		
Registered electors				
Conservative hold		Swing		

=== 1931 ===
No. 39 Little Woolton
Party	Candidate	Votes	%	±%
Conservative	Rupert Henry Bremner *	unopposed		
Registered electors				
Conservative hold		Swing		

=== 1934 ===
No. 39 Little Woolton
Party	Candidate	Votes	%	±%
Conservative	Rupert Henry Bremner *	unopposed		
Registered electors		744		
Conservative hold		Swing		

=== 1937 ===
No. 39 Little Woolton
Party	Candidate	Votes	%	±%
Conservative	Rupert Henry Bremner *	496	88%	
Labour	George Thomas Wood	69	12%	
Majority		427		
Registered electors		874		
Turnout		565	65%	
Conservative hold		Swing		

=== 1945 ===
Little Woolton - 2 seats
Party	Candidate	Votes	%	±%
Conservative	James Forster Brakell	715	68%	
Conservative	Gordon Frederick Catlin	671	64%	
Liberal	Marshal Fraser McGregor	196	19%	
Labour	Margaret Ella Doughty	137	13%	
Majority		519		
Registered electors		1,456		
Turnout		1,048	72%	

=== 1947 ===
Little Woolton
Party	Candidate	Votes	%	±%
Conservative	Gordon Frederick Catlin	1,134	84%	
Labour	William Thomas Benn	189	14%	
Independent	Frederick Bowman	21	2%	
Majority		945		
Registered electors		1,974		
Turnout		1,344	68%	
Conservative hold		Swing		

=== 1949 ===
Little Woolton - 2 seats
Party	Candidate	Votes	%	±%
Conservative	Eric Cuthbert Arden ^{(PARTY)}	1,268	63%	−5%
Conservative	Mrs. Phyllis Josephine Cundy	1,267	63%	−5%
Labour	Roy Stoddart	730	37%	+24%
Labour	Howell James	691	35%	+22%
Majority		538		
Registered electors		2,983		
Turnout		1,998	67%	−5%
Conservative hold		Swing	-5%	
Conservative hold		Swing	-5%	

=== 1950 ===
Little Woolton
Party	Candidate	Votes	%	±%
Conservative	Eric Cuthbert Arden ^{(PARTY)}	1,173	62%	−22%
Labour	Roy Stoddart	704	38%	+24%
Majority		469		
Registered electors		3,018		
Turnout		1,877	62%	−6%
Conservative hold		Swing		

=== 1951 ===
Little Woolton
Party	Candidate	Votes	%	±%
Conservative	Gordon Frederick Catlin *	1,257	68%	−16%
Labour	Francis Burke	603	32%	+18%
Majority		654		
Registered electors		3,047		
Turnout		1,860	61%	−7%
Conservative hold		Swing	-16%	

=== 1952 ===
Little Woolton
Party	Candidate	Votes	%	±%
Conservative	John Basil Smart ^{(PARTY)}	1,153	57%	−6%
Labour	James Gardner	866	43%	+6%
Majority		287		
Registered electors		3,048		
Turnout		2,019	66%	−1%
Conservative hold		Swing		

Boundaries were readjusted and Little Woolton was deleted in 1952.
