= Lord Mayor of Liverpool =

- Arms of Liverpool City Council
- Incumbent; Cllr William Shortall since 13 May 2026
- Liverpool City Council
- Style: The Right Worshipful
- Member of: Liverpool City Council
- Nominator: Political parties
- Appointer: Liverpool City Council
- Term length: One year

The Lord Mayor of Liverpool is a largely ceremonial civic office of Liverpool City Council. The Lord Mayor is the ‘first citizen’ of Liverpool representing the city and acting as a focal point of community events and is also the presiding officer for the Liverpool City Council Chamber.

The post has existed in one form or another since the foundation of Liverpool as a borough by the Royal Charter of King John in 1207, then simply being referred to as the Mayor of Liverpool. The position is now a largely ceremonial and civic role. It is one of the two Mayor positions that serve Liverpool with the other being the Mayor of the Liverpool City Region a non ceremonial, executive post.

The position of Lord Mayor is always held by a sitting councillor, currently the Lord Mayor of Liverpool is Cllr William Shortall, who has held the post since May 2026. The current deputy Lord Mayor is Cllr Kimberley Berry.

== History ==
The most prominent Mayors were the Stanleys of Knowsley, of which Sir Thomas Stanley (son of the 3rd Earl) and the 4th, 5th, 6th, 7th, 8th, 9th, 10th, 16th and 18th Earls of Derby have held this office since ancient times. The Molyneuxs of Sefton have also held this office on numerous occasions over the centuries: Sir Richard Molyneux, his grandson Sir Richard Molyneux Baronet, the 1st Viscount Molyneux and the 7th Earl of Sefton.

When Liverpool was granted city status in 1880 it was deemed necessary for the "second city of the Empire" to have a Lord Mayor. The city was granted a Lord Mayoralty on 3 August 1893 through letters patent making it the equal third oldest office of this kind in England along with Manchester. and Robert Durning Holt became the first Lord Mayor of Liverpool.

For a substantial period of time the Lord Mayor of Liverpool used the prefix of "The Right Honourable" as did the Lord Mayor of London. Sir Albert Woods, Garter Principal King of Arms was of the opinion that this honorific should be enabled, due to the importance of Liverpool as a city second only to London. When Sir Alfred Scott-Gatty succeeded as King of Arms, he expressed the view that his predecessor had made an error. This changed nothing, however, and the city continued to use the prefix up until a Parliamentary statement in 1927. From then on the Lord Mayor was styled "The Right Worshipful".

William Wallace Currie was the first "Mayor of Liverpool" under the Municipal Corporations Act 1835.

In 1983, the Labour controlled Council replaced the office of Lord Mayor with that of chairman. The Lord Mayoralty was formally restored in 1990.

== Mayors of the Borough of Liverpool (1207–1684) ==
- 1207–91 Unknown
- 1292 John De More
- 1293 John De More
- 1294–1308 Unknown
- 1309 John De More
- 1337 Roger De More
- 1338 Adam of Liverpool
- 1339 Roger De More
- 1340 Adam of Liverpool
- 1341 Roger De More
- 1342 Adam of Liverpool
- 1343 Roger De More
- 1344 Adam of Liverpool
- 1345 Roger De More
- 1346 Adam of Liverpool
- 1347 Roger De More
- 1348 Adam of Liverpool
- 1349 Roger De More
- 1350 Adam of Liverpool
- 1351 William, Son of Adam
- 1352 Unknown
- 1353 William De Grenof
- 1356 William, Son of Adam
- 1358 William, Son of Adam
- 1361 William, Son of Adam
- 1369 William, Son of Adam
- 1373 John de Hull
- 1375–77 Richard de Aynesargh
- 1379 William, Son of Adam de Liverpool
- 1382 Richard de Aynesargh
- 1382–88 Thomas de La More
- 1396–97 Thomas de La More
- 1401 Robert De Derby
- 1416 Henry De Moysok
- 1425 Thurston De Holcroft
- 1428 John De Fasakerly
- 1448 William Gaythirde
- 1454 William Gaythirde
- 1462 Gilbert Mercer
- 1474 John Davinport
- 1476 John Crosse
- 1477–1539 Unknown
- 1540–41 Thomas Hughton
- 1541–42 Sir Richard Molyneux (Grandfather of the 1st Baronet)
- 1542–50 Unknown
- 1550–51 Ralph Sekerton
- 1551–52 Thomas More
- 1552–53 Ralph Balie
- 1553–54 Roger Walker
- 1554–55 Sir William Norres
- 1555–56 Thomas More
- 1556–57 John More
- 1557–58 Thomas More
- 1558–59 Robert Corbet
- 1559–60 Alexander Garret
- 1560–61 Ralph Sekerton
- 1561–62 Robert Corbet
- 1562–63 Alexander Garret
- 1563–64 Robert Corbet
- 1564–65 Alexander Garret
- 1565–66 John Crosse
- 1566–67 Robert Corbet
- 1567–68 William Secum
- 1568–69 Sir Thomas Stanley K.G. (son of the 3rd Earl)
- 1569–70 Henry Stanley, 4th Earl of Derby (then Lord Strange)
- 1570–71 Ralph Burscough
- 1571–72 Thomas Bavard
- 1572–73 John Crosse
- 1573–74 Robert Corbet
- 1574–75 John Mainwaring
- 1575–76 William Secum
- 1576–77 Thomas Bavard
- 1577–78 Sir Thomas Hesketh
- 1578–79 William More
- 1579–80 Edward Halsall
- 1580–81 Robert More
- 1581–82 John Crosse
- 1582–83 William Secum
- 1583–84 Ralph Burscough
- 1584–85 Thomas Bavard
- 1585–86 Ferdinando Stanley, 5th Earl of Derby (then Lord Strange)
- 1586–87 Edward Halsall
- 1587–88 William More
- 1588–89 Sir Richard Molyneux Bt
- 1589–90 Thomas Whicksted
- 1590–91 John Bird
- 1591–92 Robert More
- 1592–93 Giles Brook
- 1593–94 Robert Berry
- 1594–95 John Bird
- 1595–96 Robert More
- 1596–97 William More
- 1597–98 Richard Hodgeson
- 1598–99 William Dixon
- 1599–1600 Robert More
- 1600–01 John Bird
- 1601–02 Giles Brooks
- 1602–03 Ralph Secum
- 1603–04 William Stanley, 6th Earl of Derby
- 1604–05 Edward Moore
- 1605–06 Edmund Rose
- 1606–07 William Banaster
- 1607–08 Robert Moore
- 1608–09 Ralph Secum
- 1609–10 Richard Rose
- 1610–11 Thomas Hockenhull
- 1611–12 Edward Moore
- 1612–13 Henry Stanley
- 1613–14 Peter Ulster Alias Darbie
- 1614–15 Richard Mellinge
- 1615–16 Sir Cuthbert Halsall
- 1616–17 Robert Moore
- 1617–18 Edmund Rose
- 1618–19 Sir Richard Molyneux, 1st Viscount Molyneux
- 1619–20 Ralph Seacome
- 1620–21 Edward Moore
- 1621–22 Oliver Fairhurst
- 1622–23 John Walker
- 1623–24 John Williamson
- 1624–25 Richard Rose
- 1625–26 James Stanley, 7th Earl of Derby K.G. (then Lord Strange)
- 1626–27 Edward Moore
- 1627–28 Ralph Seacome
- 1628–29 John Walker
- 1629–30 Robert Williamson
- 1630–31 John Williamson
- 1631–32 Ralph Sandiford
- 1632–33 John Walker
- 1633–34 John Moore
- 1634–35 Robert Williamson
- 1635–36 Thomas Bickesteth
- 1636–37 William Dwarihouse
- 1637–38 Thomas Eccleston
- 1638–39 John Williamson
- 1639–40 Thomas Stanley
- 1640–41 William Ireland
- 1641–42 John Walker
- 1642–43 Thomas Bickesteth
- 1643–44 James Williamson
- 1644–45 John Holcroft
- 1645–46 Thomas Bickesteth
- 1646–47 Richard Tarleton
- 1647–48 Thomas Tarleton
- 1648–49 William Williamson
- 1649–50 Thomas Hodgeson
- 1650–51 James Williamson
- 1651–52 Thomas Williamson
- 1652–53 Ralph Massam
- 1653–54 Edward Williamson
- 1654–55 Robert Cornell
- 1655–56 Thomas Ayndoe
- 1656–57 Gilbert Formy
- 1657–58 John Holcroft
- 1658–59 Richard Peicival
- 1659–60 James Williamson
- 1660–61 Alexander Greene
- 1661–62 Henry Corles
- 1662–63 William Stanley
- 1663–64 Peter Lurting
- 1664–65 John Sturzaker
- 1665–66 Michael Tarleton
- 1666–67 Charles Stanley, 8th Earl of Derby
- 1667–68 Thomas Savage, 3rd Earl Rivers
- 1668–69 William Stanley, 9th Earl of Derby (then Lord Strange)
- 1669–70 Thomas Bickesteth
- 1670–71 Thomas Johnson
- 1671–72 Lawrence Brownlowe
- 1672–73 Silvester Richmond
- 1673–74 James Jerrom
- 1674–75 Sir Gilbert Ireland
- 1675 Thomas Bickesteth
- 1675–76 Thomas Chapman
- 1676–77 Robert Williamson
- 1677–78 William Stanley, 9th Earl of Derby
- 1678–79 John Chorley
- 1679–80 William Williamson
- 1680–81 Thomas Clayton
- 1681–82 Richard Windall
- 1682–83 Capt.Edward Tarleton
- 1683–84 Robert Seacome

== Mayors of the Borough of Liverpool (1684–1880) ==
- 1684–85 Sir Richard Atherton
- 1685–86 Oliver Lyme
- 1686–87 Peter Bold
- 1687–88 James Prescott
- 1688–89 Thomas Tyrer
- 1689–90 William Clayton
- 1690–91 Thomas Brookbancke
- 1691–92 Richard Houghton
- 1692–93 Joshua Fisher
- 1693–94 Jasper Mauditr
- 1694–95 Alexander Norres
- 1695 Thomas Johnson Snr.
- 1695–96 Thomas Johnson Jnr.
- 1696–97 William Preeson
- 1697–98 James Benn
- 1698–99 Thomas Sweeting
- 1699–1700 Cuthbert Sharples
- 1700–01 Richard Norris
- 1701–02 Thomas Bickesteth
- 1702–03 John Cockshuttle
- 1703–04 John Clievland
- 1704–05 William Hurst
- 1705–06 William Webster
- 1706–07 Sylvester Moorcroft
- 1707–08 James Stanley, 10th Earl of Derby
- 1708–09 John Seacome
- 1709–10 John Earle
- 1710–11 George Tyrer
- 1711–12 James Townsend
- 1712–13 Edward Tarleton
- 1713–14 Thomas Coore
- 1714–15 Richard Gildart
- 1715–16 William Squire
- 1716–17 Foster Cunliffe
- 1717–18 Richard Kelsall
- 1718–19 Josia Poole
- 1719–20 Thomas Fillingham
- 1720–21 Henry Taylor
- 1721–22 Bryan Blundell
- 1722–23 Edward Ratchdale
- 1723–24 John Scarbrick
- 1724–25 John Goodwin
- 1725–26 William Marsden
- 1726–27 Sir Thomas Bootle
- 1727 George Tyrer
- 1727–28 John Huges
- 1728–29 Bryan Blundell
- 1729–30 Foster Cunliffe
- 1730–31 George Tyrer
- 1731–32 Richard Gildart
- 1732–33 Thomas Brereton
- 1733–34 William Pole
- 1734–35 James Stanley, 10th Earl of Derby
- 1735–36 Foster Cunliffe
- 1736–37 George Tyrer
- 1737–38 George Norton
- 1738–39 Robert Armitage
- 1739–40 Thomas Steers
- 1740–41 Henry Trafford
- 1741 Peter Rainford
- 1741–42 William Carr
- 1742–43 Edward Trafford
- 1743–44 John Brookes
- 1744–45 Owen Pritchard
- 1745–46 James Blomfield
- 1746–47 Joseph Bird
- 1747–48 Thomas Shaw
- 1748–49 Joseph Clegg
- 1749–50 Joseph Davies
- 1750–51 James Gildart
- 1751–52 Edmund Rigby
- 1752–53 Henry Winstanley
- 1753–54 James Crosbie
- 1754–55 Charles Goore
- 1755–56 Spencer Steers
- 1756–57 Richard Hughes
- 1757–58 William Goodwin
- 1758–59 Robert Cunliffe
- 1759–60 Lawrence Spencer
- 1760–61 John Blackburne, the Younger
- 1761–62 John Williamson
- 1762–63 William Gregson
- 1763–64 George Campbell
- 1764–65 John Tarleton
- 1765–66 John Crosbie
- 1766–67 Thomas Johnson
- 1767–68 William Pownall
- 1768 Charles Goore
- 1768–69 Matthew Stron
- 1769–70 Ralph Earle
- 1770–71 John Sparling
- 1771–72 Thomas Wilson
- 1772–73 Thomas Golightly
- 1773–74 John Parr
- 1774–75 Peter Rigby
- 1775–76 James Clemens
- 1776–77 William Crobie
- 1777–78 Thomas Birch
- 1778–79 William Pole
- 1779–80 William Crobie, the Younger
- 1780–81 Richard Gerard
- 1781–82 George Case
- 1782–83 John Brown
- 1783–84 William Hesketh
- 1784–85 John Gregson
- 1785–86 Charles Pole
- 1786–87 James Gildart, the Younger
- 1787–88 Thomas Earle
- 1788–89 James Blackburne, the Younger
- 1789–90 Thomas Smyth
- 1790–91 John Sparling
- 1791–92 Henry Blundell
- 1792–93 Clayton Tarleton
- 1793–94 Henry Blundell
- 1794–95 John Shaw
- 1795–96 Peter Baker
- 1796–97 George Dunbar
- 1797–98 Thomas Staniforth
- 1798–99 Thomas Leyland
- 1799–1800 Pudsey Dawson
- 1800–01 John Shaw
- 1801–02 Peter Whitfield Brancker
- 1802–03 Jonas Bold
- 1803–04 William Harper
- 1804 John Bridge Aspinall
- 1804–05 William Harper
- 1805–06 Henry Clay
- 1806–07 Thomas Molyneux
- 1807–08 Henry Blundell Hollinshead
- 1808–09 James Gerard
- 1809–10 John Clark
- 1810–11 James Drinkwater
- 1811–12 John Bourne
- 1812–13 Samuel Staniforth
- 1813–14 William Nicholson
- 1814–15 Thomas Leyland
- 1815–16 Sir William Barton
- 1816–17 John Wright
- 1817–18 Thomas Case
- 1818–19 Jonathan Blundell Hollinshead
- 1819–20 Sir John Tobin
- 1820–21 Thomas Leyland
- 1821–22 Richard Bullin
- 1822–23 William Molyneux
- 1823–24 Charles Lawrence
- 1824–25 Jonathan Blundell Hollinshead
- 1825–26 Peter Bourne
- 1826–27 Thomas Littledale Sr.
- 1827–28 Thomas Colley Porter
- 1828–29 Nicholas Robinson
- 1829–30 Sir George Drinkwater
- 1830–31 Sir Thomas Brancker
- 1831–32 Samuel Sandbach
- 1832–33 Charles Horsfall
- 1833–34 John Wright
- 1834–35 James Aspinall
- 1835–36 William Wallace Currie
- 1836–37 William Earle Jr.
- 1837–38 William Rathbone V
- 1838–39 Hugh Hornby
- 1839–40 Sir Joshua Walmsley
- 1840–41 Thomas Bolton
- 1841–42 John S. Leigh
- 1842–43 Robertson Gladstone
- 1843–44 Thomas Sands
- 1844–45 James Lawrence
- 1845–46 David Hodgson
- 1846–47 George Hall Lawrence
- 1847–48 Thomas Berry Horsfall
- 1848–49 John Bramley-Moore
- 1849–50 John Holmes
- 1850–51 Sir John Bent
- 1851–52 Thomas Littledale Jr.
- 1852–53 Samuel Holme
- 1853–54 John Buck Lloyd
- 1854–55 James Aspinall Tobin
- 1855–56 John Stewart
- 1856–57 Francis Shand
- 1857–58 James Holme
- 1858–59 William Preston
- 1859–60 Thomas Darnley Anderson
- 1860–61 Samuel Robert Graves
- 1861–62 Robert Hutchinson.
- 1862–63 Richard Cardwell Gardner
- 1863–64 Charles Mozley
- 1864–65 Edward Lawrence
- 1865–66 John Farnworth
- 1866–67 John Grant Morris
- 1867–68 Edward Whitley
- 1868–69 Thomas Dover
- 1869–70 Joseph Hubback
- 1870–71 Joseph Gibbons Livingston
- 1871–72 John Pearson
- 1872–73 Edward Samuelson
- 1873–74 Sir Andrew Barclay Walker Bt.
- 1874–75 Lieut. Col. Richard Fell Steble
- 1875–76 Peter Thomson (died 13 May 1876)
- 1876 Lieut. Col. Richard Fell Steble (reappointed 22 May 1876 until the next election)
- 1876–77 Sir Andrew Barclay Walker Bt.
- 1877–78 Sir Arthur Forwood, 1st Baronet
- 1878–79 Sir Thomas Bland Royden, 1st Baronet
- 1879–80 Bernard Hall

== Mayors of the City of Liverpool (1880–1892) ==
- 1879–80 Bernard Hall
- 1880–81 Sir William Bower Forwood
- 1881–82 John Hughes
- 1882–83 William Radcliffe
- 1883–84 Thomas Holder
- 1884–85 Sir David Radcliffe.
- 1885–86 Sir David Radcliffe
- 1886–87 Sir James Poole
- 1887–88 Thomas William Oakshott
- 1888–89 Edward Hatton Cookson
- 1889–90 Thomas Hughes.
- 1890–91 Joseph Bond Morgan.
- 1891–92 James de Bels Adam.
- 1892–93 Robert Durning Holt

== Lord Mayors of the City of Liverpool (1892–present) ==
- 1893 Robert Durning Holt
- 1893–94 Sir William Bowring, 1st Baronet
- 1894–95 William Henry Watts
- 1895–96 Frederick Stanley, 16th Earl of Derby
- 1896–97 Thomas Hughes
- 1897–98 John Houlding
- 1898–99 William Oulton
- 1899–1900 Louis Samuel Cohen
- 1900–01 Arthur Crossthwaite
- 1901–02 Sir Charles Petrie, 1st Baronet
- 1902–03 Sir William Rutherford, 1st Baronet (resigned Jan 1903)
- 1903 Sir William Bower Forwood (Jan–Feb 1903)
- 1903 Sir William Rutherford, 1st Baronet (re-elected Feb 1903)
- 1903–04 Sir Robert Alfred Hampson
- 1904–05 John Lea
- 1905–06 Joseph Ball
- 1906–07 John Japp
- 1907–08 Richard Caton, M.D.
- 1908–09 Harold Chaloner Dowdall
- 1909–10 William Humphrey Williams
- 1910–11 Samuel Mason Hutchinson
- 1911–12 Edward Stanley, 17th Earl of Derby
- 1912–13 Sir John Harmood-Banner, 1st Baronet
- 1913–14 Herbert Henry Rathbone
- 1914–15 John Edward Rayner
- 1915–16 Arthur Stanley Mather
- 1916–17 Sir Max Muspratt, 1st Baronet
- 1917–18 Sir John Utting
- 1918–19 John Ritchie
- 1919–20 Burton William Eills
- 1920–21 Edward Russell Taylor
- 1921–22 Charles Henry Rutherford
- 1922–23 Frank Campbell Wilson
- 1923–24 Sir Arnold Rushton
- 1924–25 Thomas Dowd
- 1925–26 Sir Frederick Charles Bowring
- 1926–27 Sir Frederick Charles Bowring
- 1927–28 Margaret Beavan
- 1928–29 Henry Morley Miller
- 1929–30 Lawrence Durning Holt
- 1930–31 Edwin Thompson.
- 1931–32 James Conrad Cross
- 1932–33 Alfred Gates
- 1933–34 George Alfred Strong
- 1934–35 Frederick Thomas Richardson
- 1935–36 Robert John Hall
- 1936–37 William Denton
- 1937–38 Michael Cory Dixon
- 1938–39 Sir Sydney Jones
- 1939–40 Sir Sydney Jones
- 1940–41 Sir Sydney Jones
- 1941–42 Sir Sydney Jones
- 1942–43 Robert Duncan French
- 1943–44 Austin Harford
- 1944–45 Hugh Molyneux, 7th Earl of Sefton
- 1945–46 Luke Hogan
- 1946–47 William Gainsborough Gregson
- Nov.1947 – May 1949 Walter Thomas Lancashire
- 1949–50 Sir Joseph Jackson Cleary
- 1950–51 Revd. Harry Dixon Longbottom
- 1951–52 Vere Egerton Cotton
- 1952–53 Albert Morrow
- 1953–54 William John Tristram
- 1954–55 Alexander Griffin
- 1955–56 Reginald Richard Bailey
- 1956–57 John Sheehan
- 1957–58 Frank Hamilton Cain
- 1958–59 Sir Harry Livermore
- 1959–60 Herbert Neville Bewley
- 1960–61 John Leslie Hughes
- 1961–62 Peter McKernan
- 1962–63 David John Lewis
- 1963–64 John Mcmillan
- 1964–65 Louis Caplan
- 1965–66 David Cowley
- 1966–67 Herbert Mylrea Allen
- 1967–68 Ethel May Wormald
- 1968–69 James Edward Thompson
- 1969–70 Stephen Minion
- 1970–71 Ian Isadore Levin
- 1971–72 Charles Cowlin
- 1972–73 Robert Meadows
- 1973–74 Francis Burke
- 1974–75 Joseph Robert Wilmington.
- 1975–76 Owen Joseph Doyle
- 1976–77 Raymond Frederick Craine
- 1977–78 Paul Orr
- 1978–79 Ruth Dean
- 1979–80 Doreen Jones
- 1980–81 James Stanislaus Ross
- 1981 Cyril Eric Carr
- 1981–82 James Stanislaus Ross
- 1982–83 Stanley Airey
- 1983–84 Hugh Dalton – Chairman
- 1984–85 Hugh Dalton – Chairman
- 1985–86 Hugh Dalton – Chairman
- 1986–87 Hugh Dalton – Chairman
- 1987 Lady Doreen Jones – 17 March – 19 May
- 1987–88 Thomas McManus – Chairman
- 1988–89 Dorothy May Gavin – Chairman
- 1989–90 Dorothy May Gavin – Chairman
- 1990–91 Dorothy May Gavin
- 1991–92 Trevor Smith
- 1992–93 Rosemary Cooper
- 1993–94 Michael Black
- 1994–95 Roger Johnston
- 1995–96 Michael Black
- 1996–97 Frank Doran
- 1997–98 Margaret Clarke
- 1998–99 Herbert E. Herrity
- 1999–2000 Joseph A. Devaney.
- 2000–01 Edwin M. Clein.
- 2001–02 Gerard P. Scott
- 2002–03 Jack Spriggs
- 2003–04 Ron Gould
- 2004–05 Frank Roderick
- 2005–06 Alan Dean
- 2006–07 Joan Lang
- 2007–08 Paul Clark
- 2008–09 Steve Rotheram
- 2009–10 Mike Storey
- 2010–11 Hazel Williams
- 2011–12 Frank Prendergast
- 2012–13 Sharon Sullivan
- 2013–14 Gary Millar
- 2014–2015 Erica Kemp
- 2015–2016 Tony Concepcion
- 2016–2017 Roz Gladden
- 2017–2018 Malcolm Kennedy
- 2018–2019 Christine Banks
- 2019 Peter Brennan (resigned)
- 2019–2020 Anna Rothery
- 2020–2021 Anna Rothery
- 2021–2022 Mary Rasmussen
- 2022–2023 Roy Gladden
- 2023–2024 Mary Rasmussen
- 2024-2025 Richard Kemp
- 2025–2026 Barbara Murray
- 2026–present William Shortall

== See also ==
- Numbers 11-13 Wolstenholme Square
