= Reginald Richard Bailey =

English politician

Richard Bailey
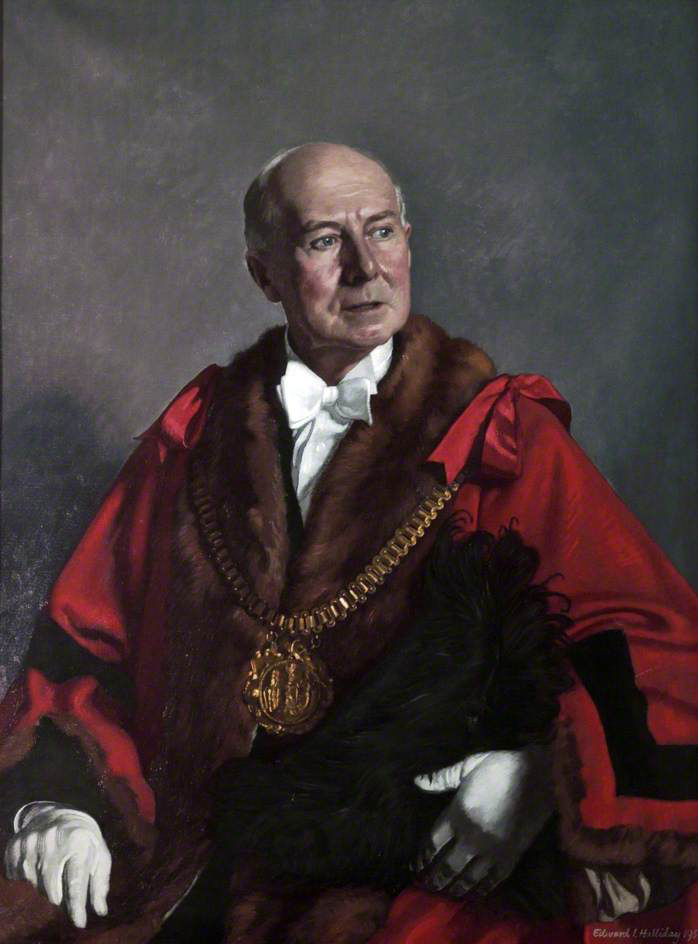
- Portrait by Edward Halliday

Lord Mayor of Liverpool
- In office 1955–1956
- Preceded by: Alexander Griffin
- Succeeded by: John Sheehan

Personal details
- Born: Reginald Richard Bailey; 25 August 1890 Walton, Liverpool
- Died: 12 December 1972 (aged 82) Liverpool, England

Reginald Richard Bailey FSA JP (25 August 1890 – 12 December 1972) was an English accountant and Liverpool City Councilman. He served as Lord Mayor of Liverpool from 1955–56.

He was born in Walton, Liverpool to Richard and Eliza Ann Bailey. He was educated at Liverpool College and worked as a chartered account.

Bailey was elected to Liverpool City Council on 1 November 1931, as a Conservative for Walton Ward. He was heavily involved in municipal finance, and his advice was frequently sought on budget matters. He was chairman of the Watch Committee and the Hospitals and Port Health Committee, and served on numerous other committees, including the Finance, Health, and Parliamentary committees. During the Second World War, he served as financial adviser to Liverpool companies with War contracts. He also represented the LCC in the Liverpool Philharmonic Society, and acted as a Receiver of the High Court. He remained unseated until 1948 when he was elected as an alderman by the City Council on 5 May 1948.

Bailey was an early cinema enthusiast. In 1955, he was director of the Clubmoor Picture House and the Premier theatres in Liverpool, and chairman of the Regal in Ormskirk.

Bailey was unmarried. He died in hospital in Liverpool, aged 82. He was survived by his sister, Mabel.
