= Liverpool Mercury =

Defunct English newspaper (1811–1904)

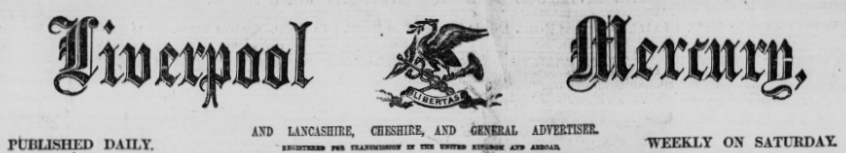
- Founder: Egerton Smith
- Founded: 5 July 1811; 214 years ago
- Ceased publication: 1904
- Country: United Kingdom

The Liverpool Mercury was an English newspaper that originated in Liverpool, England. As well as focusing on local news, the paper also reported on both national and international news allowing it to circulate in Lancashire, Wales, Isle of Man and London.

== History ==
Founded by Egerton Smith in 1811 the newspaper cost 7d and was published weekly, covering news relating to the city's busy port. In 1827, the paper had offices on Lord Street. By 1858 the newspaper switched from being a weekly paper to a daily, with an extended edition published on Fridays. The paper's second edition was claimed to be 72 columns long, making it one of the largest newspapers in the world. During the early 1900s the Mercury merged with rival paper Liverpool Daily Post to become the Liverpool Daily Post and the Liverpool Mercury whose first edition was published on 14 November 1904.

The Liverpool Mercury supported the successful bid by Thomas Colley Porter to become Lord Mayor of Liverpool in 1827. Parliamentary historian Margaret Escott says that the election, in which Porter beat Nicholas Robinson by 1,780 votes to 1,765, was "the most expensive, venal and violent mayoral contest" up to that time. Votes were bought at prices ranging between £6 and £50, with the candidates spending in total around £8,000–10,000 each. The two sides co-operated with a subsequent inquiry that resulted in three people being prosecuted and disenfranchised for bribery.
