= 1937 Coronation Honours =

1937 appointments in honour of the new monarch

The 1937 Coronation Honours were awarded in honour of the coronation of George VI.

== Royal Honours ==
=== Order of the Thistle ===
- The Queen

=== Royal Victorian Chain ===
- The Queen
- Queen Mary
- Clive, Baron Wigram

=== Royal Victorian Order (GCVO) ===
- The Queen of Norway
- Mary, Princess Royal and Countess of Harewood
- Princess Louise, Duchess of Argyll
- Princess Beatrice

=== Order of the British Empire (GBE) ===
- The Duchess of Gloucester
- The Duchess of Kent
- Princess Alice, Countess of Athlone

=== Privy Council ===
- The Duke of Kent

== Peerages ==
=== Earldoms ===
- Vere Brabazon, Earl of Bessborough, GCMG
- Claude George, Earl of Strathmore and Kinghorne, KT, GCVO, TD

=== Viscountcies ===
- Sir Robert Stevenson Horne, GBE, KC, MP
- Sir Herbert Louis Samuel, GCB, GBE, MP

=== Baronies ===
- Christopher Addison, MD, FRCS, MP
- Sir George Bowyer, Bt., MC, DL, MP
- Sir John Cadman, GCMG
- Admiral of the Fleet Sir Alfred Ernle Montacute Chatfield, GCB, KCMG, CVO
- Julius Salter Elias
- Colonel John Cuthbert Denison-Pender, MP
- Sir Frederick George Penny, Bt., JP, MP
- Sir Walter Russell Rea, Bt.
- Sir John Davenport Siddeley, CBE

== Knights/Ladies of the Order of the Garter (KG/LG) ==
- Captain His Grace Bernard Marmaduke, Duke of Norfolk
- Henry Hugh Arthur Fitzroy, Duke of Beaufort, GCVO (additional Knight)
- William Thomas Brownlow, Marquess of Exeter, CMG, TD
- Claude George, Earl of Strathmore and Kinghorne, KT, GCVO, TD (additional Knight)

== Knights/Ladies of the Order of the Thistle (KT/LT) ==
- Lieutenant-Colonel John James Hamilton, Earl of Stair, DSO
- Sir Iain Colquhoun, Bt., DSO

== Privy Counsellors ==
- Edward Leslie Burgin, MP
- Sir Felix Cassel, Bt., KC
- Colonel Sir George Loyd Courthope, Bt., MC, JP, DL, MP
- Sir Patrick Duncan, GCMG, Governor-General of the Union of South Africa
- Isaac Foot, MP
- Viscount Galway, GCMG, DSO, OBE Governor-General of New Zealand
- Brigadier Baron Gowrie, GCMG, CB, DSO, Governor-General of Australia
- Ernest Lapointe, KC
- Frederick William Pethick-Lawrence, MP
- Sir Robert William Hugh O'Neill, Bt., MP
- Lord Snell, CBE, JP, MP
- Lord Tweedsmuir, GCMG, CH, Governor General of Canada

== Baronetcies ==
- Sir Richard Dawson Bates, OBE, DL, MP
- Captain Sir William Edge, JP, MP
- Major Sir Sir George Hamilton, 1st Baronet, JP, MP
- Commander Archibald Richard James Southby, JP, DL, MP
- Sir Cuthbert Sidney Wallace, KCMG, CB, FRCS, LRCP
- Sir David Milne-Watson, DL
- Sir Robert Eaton White, VD, DL

== Knighthood ==
- Captain Thomas Noel Arkell. For political and public services in Swindon, Wiltshire.
- The Right Honourable Anthony Brutus Babington, K.C., M.P., Attorney-General, Northern Ireland.
- Arnold Edward Trevor Bax, Esq., D.Mus. For services to music.
- John Bennett, Esq., Vice-Chancellor of the Court of the County Palatine of Lancaster.
- Henry Berney, Esq., J.P., D.L. For political and public services in Croydon.
- Archibald Campbell Black, Esq., O.B.E., K.C., Procurator to the General Assembly of the Church of Scotland since 1935.
- Maurice Bloch, Esq., J.P. For political and public services in Glasgow.
- Muirhead Bone, Esq., LL.D. For services to art.
- Paul Malone Booth, Esq., Chairman of the Management Committee of the National Liberal Club. For political and public services.
- William Bradshaw, Esq., J.P., President of the Co-operative Wholesale Society.
- Clement Edmund Royds Brocklebank, Esq., M.P., Member of Parliament for the Fairfield division of Liverpool since 1931 and for East Nottingham 1924 to 1929. For political and public services.
- George Frederick Clucas, Esq., C.B.E., Speaker of the House of Keys, Isle of Man.
- Lieutenant-Colonel William Thomas Cox, D.S.O. For public and philanthropic services.
- Robert William Dalton, Esq., C.M.G., His Majesty's Senior Trade Commissioner in Australia.
- Hubert Arthur Dowson, Esq., Solicitor of Nottingham. President of the Law Society.
- Oscar Follett Dowson, Esq., C.B.E., Legal Adviser, Home Office.
- David Rowland Evans, Esq., General Secretary of the Liberal National Organisation. For political and public services.
- Frank Fletcher, Esq., formerly Master of Marlborough College and Headmaster of Charterhouse School.
- Colonel Edmund Vivian Gabriel, C.S.I., C.M.G., C.V.O., C.B.E. Gentleman Usher to His Majesty The King.
- Charles Granville Gibson, Esq., M.P., Member of Parliament for Pudsey and Otley since 1929. For political and public services.
- Major Francis William Crewe Fetherston-Godley, O.B.E., D.L., chairman, National Executive Council of the British Legion.
- Arthur Frederick Hurst, Esq., D.M., F.R.C.P., Senior Physician to Guy's Hospital.
- Ernest James Johnson, Esq. For political and public services in Staffordshire.
- Sidney Midlane Johnson, Esq., Secretary of the County Councils Association.
- Charles Sydney Jones, Esq., Pro-Chancellor of Liverpool University. For public services.
- Henry Haydn Jones, Esq., M.P., Member of Parliament for Merioneth since 1910. For political and public services.
- Colonel John James Jones, V.D., J.P., D.L. For public and philanthropic services in Wales.
- Thomas William Miller-Jones, Esq. For political and public services in the East End of London.
- Percy John Luxton Kelland, Esq., M.R.C.V.S., Chief Veterinary Officer, Ministry of Agriculture and Fisheries.
- Alderman Harold Vaughan Kenyon, M.B.E., J.P. For political and public services in West London.
- Robert McDougall, Esq., J.P. For public and philanthropic services, especially to the National Trust.
- Gilbert McIlquham, Esq., J.P. For political and public services in Gloucestershire.
- William Marchbank Marshall, Esq. For political and public services in Scotland.
- Commodore Charles George Matheson, D.S.O., R.D., R.N.R. (Retired), Commodore, Orient Steam Navigation Company.
- Allen Mawer, Esq., Litt.D., F.B.A., Provost of University College, London. Director of Survey of English Place Names.
- Lieutenant-Colonel Thomas Cecil Russell Moore, C.B.E., M.P., Member of Parliament for the Ayr Burghs since June, 1925. For political and public services.
- George Morley, Esq., C.B.E., Chief Constable of Durham.
- Judge Allan George Mossop, Judge of His Majesty's Supreme Court for China.
- John Niven, Esq., Chairman of the Baltic Mercantile and Shipping Exchange.
- Robert Howson Pickard, Esq., D.Sc., Ph.D., F.R.S., F.I.C., Director of the British Cotton Industry Research Association.
- Alexander West Russell, Esq., M.P., Member of Parliament for Tynemouth since November, 1922. For political and public services.
- Joshua Scholefield, Esq., K.C., Chairman of the Railway Assessment Authority. President, London Passenger Transport Arbitration Tribunal.
- Harry Bertram Shackleton, Esq., Chairman of the Wool Textile Delegation. President of the Wool and Worsted Trades Federation.
- Major Reginald Hugh Dorman-Smith, J.P., M.P., President of the National Farmers' Union.
- Major Thomas Gabriel Lumley Lumley-Smith, D.S.O., F.S.A., Grand Secretary of Mark Master Masons.
- Louis Saul Sterling, Esq. For political and public services.
- John Taylor, Esq. For political and public services in Blackburn.
- Professor D'Arcy Wentworth Thompson, C.B., D.Litt., D.Sc., LL.D., F.R.S., F.R.S.E., Professor of Natural History, University of St. Andrews.
- Sylvanus Percival Vivian, Esq., C.B., Registrar-General in England and Wales.
- Hugh Seymour Walpole, Esq., C.B.E. For services to literature.
- Pelham Francis Warner, Esq., M.B.E. For services to sport.
- Harold Beckwith Whitehouse, Esq., M.B., M.S., F.R.C.S., Professor of Midwifery and Diseases of Women, University of Birmingham.
- William Valentine Wood, Esq., Senior Vice-president of the Executive of the London Midland and Scottish Railway Company.
- Captain William Henry Laycock Wordsworth, J.P. For political and public services in the North Riding of Yorkshire.

Dominions.

- Henry Chapman, Esq., C.B.E., Resident Director and General Manager of the Rhodesian Railway Companies.
- Robert William Chapman, Esq., C.M.G., Professor of Engineering, University of Adelaide, State of South Australia. For public services.
- William James Clemens, Esq., C.M.G., I.S.O., Commissioner, Public Service Board, Commonwealth of Australia.
- Samuel Sydney Cohen, Esq. For public services in the State of New South Wales.
- Major the Honourable Henry Alan Currie, M.C., Member of the Legislative Council, State of Victoria. For public services.
- Ernest Davis, Esq., Mayor of the City of Auckland, Dominion of New Zealand.
- Ernest Thomas Fisk, Esq., A.M.I.E. (Aust.). For public services in the State of New South Wales.
- Charles John Boyd Norwood, Esq. For public services in the Dominion of New Zealand.
- James Wallace Sandford, Esq. For public services in the Commonwealth of Australia.
- The Honourable Alexander George Wales, J.P., Lord Mayor of the City of Melbourne, State of Victoria.

India.

- M. R. Ry. Diwan Bahadur Subbarayalu Kumaraswami Reddiyar Avargal, lately Minister for Education and Public Health to the Governor of Madras, Madras.
- Rao Bahadur Chaudhuri Chhotu Ram, Member of the Punjab Legislative Assembly, Minister for Development to the Governor of the Punjab.
- Idwal Geoffrey Lloyd, Esq., C.S.I., Indian Civil Service (retired), lately Member of the Executive Council of the Governor of Burma.
- Robert Ernest Jack, Esq., Indian Civil Service, Puisne Judge of the High Court of Judicature at Fort William in Bengal.
- Kenneth William Barlee, Esq., Barrister-at-Law, Indian Civil Service, Puisne Judge of the High Court of Judicature at Bombay,
- John Gibb Thorn, Esq., D.S.O., M.C., Puisne Judge of the High Court of Judicature at Allahabad, United Provinces.
- Frederick Louis Grille, Esq., Barrister-at-Law, Indian Civil Service, Puisne Judge of the High Court of Judicature at Nagpur, Central Provinces.
- George Richard Frederick Tottenham, Esq., C.S.I., C.I.E., Indian Civil Service, lately Secretary to the Government of India in the Defence Department.
- Theodore James Tasker, Esq., C.I.E., O.B.E., Indian Civil Service, Revenue and Police Member, His Exalted Highness the Nizam's Government, Hyderabad, Deccan.
- Kenneth Mclntyre Kemp, Esq., Barrister-at-Law, J.P., Advocate-General, Bombay.
- Brigadier Harold John Couchman, D.S.O., M.C., R.E., Surveyor-General of India.
- John Nesbitt Gordon Johnson, Esq., C.S.I., C.I.E., Indian Civil Service, lately Chief Commissioner of Delhi.
- Seth Haji Abdoola Haroon, Member of the Central Legislative Assembly, Merchant, Sind.
- Colonel Arthur Olver, C.B., C.M.G., F.R.C.V.S., F.N.L, Royal Army Veterinary Corps (retired), Expert Adviser in Animal Husbandry to the Imperial Council of Agricultural Research.
- Colonel Edward Hearle Cole, C.B., C.M.G., Indian Army (retired), Landlord, Okara Punjab.
- Thomas Howard Elderton, Esq., chairman, Calcutta Port Trust, Bengal.
- Frank Birley, Esq., Member of the Madras Legislative Council, Director, Messrs. Best & Co., Ltd., Madras.
- David Burnett Meek, Esq., C.I.E., O.B.E., Indian Educational Service, Indian Trade Commissioner in London.
- Frank Herbert Brown, Esq., C.I.E., Honorary Secretary, East India Association, London.
- Vivian Everard Donne Jarrad, Esq., Agent, Bengal-Nagpur Railway.
- Narayan Vishvanath Mandlik, Esq., Advocate, Bombay.

Colonies, Protectorates, &c.

- Waithilingam Duraiswamy, Esq., Speaker of the State Council, Ceylon.
- Vandeleur Molyneux Grayburn, Esq. For public services in Hong Kong.
- Arthur Edwin Horn, Esq., C.M.G., M.D., M.R.C.P., Consulting Physician to the Colonial Office.
- George Frederick Huggins, Esq., O.B.E. For public services in Trinidad.
- Charles Ewan Law, Esq., Colonial Legal Service, Chief Justice, Zanzibar.
- George William Arthur Trimmer, Esq., M.I.C.E., M.I.M.E., M.Inst.T., chairman and General Manager of the Singapore and Penang Harbour Boards, Straits Settlements.
- Armigel de Vins Wade, Esq., C.M.G., O.B.E., Colonial Administrative Service, Colonial Secretary, Kenya.

== Order of the Bath ==
=== Knights/Dames Grand Cross (GCB) ===
==== Military ====
- General Sir John Theodosius Burnett-Stuart, KCB, KBE, CMG, DSO
- General Sir Hubert de la Poer Gough, GCMG, KCB, KCVO
- Air Chief Marshal Sir John Miles Steel, KCB, KBE, CMG

==== Civil ====
- Sir Isaac Alfred Isaacs, GCMG, former Governor-General of Australia
- Sir Horace John Wilson, GCMG, KCB, CBE

=== Knights/Dames Commander (KCB/DCB) ===
==== Military ====
- Vice-Admiral Sir Geoffrey Blake, CB, DSO
- Vice-Admiral Sir Alexander Ramsay, KCVO, CB, DSO
- Lieutenant-General Sir Robert Gordon-Finlayson, CB, CMG, DSO
- Lieutenant-General Sir John Dill, CB, CMG, DSO
- Lieutenant-General Sir Henry Karslake, KCSI, CB, CMG, DSO
- Major-General (Indian Army) Sir Roger Wilson, CB, DSO, MC
- Air Marshal Sir Wilfrid Freeman, CB, DSO, MC

==== Civil ====
- Lieutenant-Colonel George Augustus Anson, CBE, MVO
- John Donald Balfour Fergusson, CB Permanent Secretary, Ministry of Agriculture and Fisheries
- Edgar John Forsdyke, FSA Director and Principal Librarian, British Museum
- Sir Thomas Robert Gardiner, KBE Director General of the Post Office
- Edward Mellanby, FRCP, FRS Secretary, Medical Research Council
- Sir James Rae Under Secretary, H.M. Treasury.
- Sir Godfrey John Vignoles Thomas, Bt., KCVO, CSI Private Secretary to H.R.H. The Duke of Gloucester.
- Sir Gerald Woods Wollaston, KCVO Garter Principal King of Arms

=== Companions (CB) ===
==== Military ====
- Rear-Admiral Francis Thomas Butler Tower, OBE
- Rear-Admiral Alfred Englefield Evans, OBE
- Rear-Admiral John Henry Dacres Cunningham, MVO
- Rear-Admiral Edward Rupert Drummond, MVO
- Rear-Admiral Herbert Fitzherbert, CMG
- Engineer Rear-Admiral Augustus George Crousaz
- Surgeon Rear-Admiral Guy Leslie Buckeridge, OBE, MRCS, LRCP, KHS
- Paymaster Rear-Admiral Arthur Foster Strickland, OBE
- Archdeacon Arthur Deane Gilbertson, OBE
- Colonel-Commandant Alan George Barwys Bourne, DSO, MVO
- Captain Arthur Goodall Maundrell, CIE, RIN
- Major-General Osburne Ievers, DSO
- Major-General Francis Stewart Gilderoy Piggott, DSO
- Major-General Henry Marrian Joseph Perry, OBE
- Major-General Algernon Philip Yorke Langhorne, DSO, MC
- Major-General Ernest Cyril Gepp, DSO
- Major General Viscount Gort, VC, CBE, DSO, MVO, MC
- Major-General Ernest Ker Squires, DSO, MC
- Major-General Basil Alexander Hill, DSO
- Major-General Maxwell Spieker Brander, OBE
- Major-General Donald Kenneth McLeod, DSO
- Major-General William Haywood Hamilton, CIE, CBE, DSO, FRCS
- Major-General John Evelyn Duigan, DSO, MC
- Major-General Henry Augustus Lewis, CBE
- Colonel (Temp. Brigadier) Arthur Francis Gore Perry Knox-Gore, DSO
- Colonel (Local Major-General) Robert Ferguson Lock
- Colonel (Hon. Brigadier) Christopher George Ling, DSO, MC
- Colonel James Aubrey Smith, CMG
- Air Vice-Marshal Arthur Sheridan Barratt, C.M.G., M.C., Royal Air Force.
- Air Vice-Marshal Ernest Leslie Gossage, D.S.O., M.C., Royal Air Force.
- Air Commodore Albert Victor John Richardson, O.B.E., M.B., B.Ch., D.P.H., K.H.S., Royal Air Force.

==== Civil ====
- Charles Seymour Wright, OBE, MC
- Major-General Henry Augustus Lewis, C.B.E. (late Royal Artillery), Director of Artillery, the War Office.
- Honorary Colonel George, Baron Rochdale, President, Territorial Army and Air Force Association of the County of Middlesex.
- Honorary Colonel Sir Henry William Cameron-Ramsay-Fairfax-Lucy, Bt., chairman, Territorial Army and Air Force Association of the County of Warwick.
- Colonel Leonard Green, M.C., T.D., Territorial Army, Commander, 125th (Lancashire Fusiliers) Infantry Brigade.
- David Randall Pye, Esq., M.A., Sc.D., M.I.Mech.E., F.R.Ae.S., Director of Scientific Research, Air Ministry.
- Walter Raymond Birchall, Esq., Deputy Director-General, General Post Office.
- William John Braithwaite, Esq., Commissioner for the Special Purposes of the Income Tax Acts.
- John Ainsworth Dale, Esq., C.B.E., Principal Assistant Secretary, Ministry of Labour.
- John Harry Hebb, Esq., C.B.E., M.B., B.Ch.; Director-General of Medical Services, Ministry of Pensions.
- Algar Henry Stafford Howard, Esq., C.V.O., Norroy King of Arms and Principal Herald of the North Part of England.
- Alan Frederick Lascelles, Esq., C.M.G., M.V.O., M.C., Assistant Private Secretary to His Majesty The King.
- Francis William Lascelles, Esq., M.C., Principal Clerk of Public Bills, House of Lords.
- Cecil Winton Maudslay, Esq., Principal Assistant Secretary, Board of Education.
- Bernard Rackham, Esq., F.S.A., Keeper, Department of Ceramics, Victoria and Albert Museum.
- George Thomas Reid, Esq., Principal Assistant Secretary, Unemployment Assistance Board.
- Lieutenant-Colonel Frederic Newell Westbury, O.B.E., M.C., Regional Director, Scottish Region, General Post Office.

== Order of Merit (OM) ==
- Lieutenant-General the Lord Baden-Powell, GCMG, GCVO, KCB

== Order of the Star of India ==
=== Knights Grand Commander (GCSI) ===
- the Maharaja of Jind, GCIE, KCSI

=== Knights Commander (KCSI) ===
- Kanwar Sir Jagdish Prasad, CSI, CIE, OBE
- Sir Muhammad Zafarullah Khan
- Mir Sir Muhammad Nazim Khan, the Mir of Hunza, KCIE

=== Companions (CSI) ===
- Claude Henry Gidney, Esq., C.I.E., Indian Political Service, Officiating Resident at Hyderabad.
- Vice-Admiral Arthur Edward Frederick Bedford, C.B., Flag Officer Commanding, The Royal Indian Navy.
- Hugh Dow, Esq., C.I.E., Indian Civil Service, Secretary to the Government of India in the Commerce Department.
- Arthur Cunningham Lothian, Esq., C.I.E., Indian Political Service, Additional Secretary to the Crown Representative.
- Henry Joseph Twynam, Esq., C.I.E., Indian Civil Service, lately Officiating Chief Secretary to the Government of Bengal.
- Major-General Edward Merivale Steward, C.B., O.B.E., Indian Army, Director of Supplies and Transport, Army Headquarters, India.
- Major-General Hugh Francis Edward MacMahon, C.B., C.B.E., M.C., Indian Army, Deputy Adjutant and Quartermaster-General, Northern Command.
- M. R. Ry. Diwan Bahadur Narsimha Ayyangar Gopalaswami Ayyangar Avargal, C.I.E., lately Member, Board of Revenue, Madras.
- William Bailie Brett, Esq., C.I.E., Indian Civil Service, Chief Secretary to the Government of Bihar.
- Clement Wansbrough Gwynne, Esq., C.I.E., O.B.E., Indian Civil Service, Chief Secretary to the Government of the United Provinces.
- Charles Francis Waterfall, Esq., C.I.E., Indian Civil Service, Chief Secretary to the Government of the Central Provinces.
- John William Smyth, Esq., C.I.E., Indian Civil Service, Commissioner, Central Division, Bombay.
- Charles Frederick Grant, Esq., Indian Civil Service (retired), lately Commissioner, Burma

== Order of St Michael and St George ==
=== Knights Grand Cross (GCMG) ===
- Sir William Henry Clark, KCSI, KCMG – His Majesty's High Commissioner for Basutoland, the Bechuanaland Protectorate and Swaziland.
- Sir Robert Randolph Garran, KCMG, KC. For public services in the Commonwealth of Australia.
- The Right Honourable Sir Michael Myers, KCMG – Chief Justice, Dominion of New Zealand.
- Sir Bernard Henry Bourdillon, K.C.M.G., K.B.E., Governor and Commander-in-Chief of the Colony and Protectorate of Nigeria.
- The Right Honourable Sir Percy Lyham Loraine, Bt., K.C.M.G., His Majesty's Ambassador Extraordinary and Plenipotentiary at Angora.
- Sir Frederick William Leith-Ross, K.C.B., K.C.M.G., Chief Economic Adviser to His Majesty's Government.

=== Knights Commander (KCMG) ===
- Sir David Thomas Chadwick, CSI, CIE – Secretary of the Imperial Economic Committee and of the Executive Council of the Imperial Agricultural Bureaux.
- The Honourable Sir Frederick Wollaston Mann, LLM – Lieutenant-Governor and Chief Justice of the State of Victoria.
- Algernon Phillips Withiel Thomas – Emeritus Professor, Auckland University College, Dominion of New Zealand. For services to education.
- Sir John Caulcutt. For services to the Colonial Office and to the Colonies in regard to currency and banking problems.
- Lieutenant-Colonel Charles Henry Fortnom Cox, C.M.G., D.S.O., R.A., British Resident, Trans-Jordan.
- Sir Arthur Salisbury Lawrance, K.B.E., C.M.G., D.S.O., Governor and Commander-in-Chief of the Somaliland Protectorate.
- Lieutenant-Colonel Lord Francis George Montagu-Douglas-Scott, D.S.O. For public services in Kenya.
- William Barrowclough Brown, Esq., C.B., C.B.E., Second Secretary to the Board of Trade.
- Cecil Francis Joseph Dormer, Esq., M.V.O., His Majesty's Envoy Extraordinary and Minister Plenipotentiary at Oslo.
- Norman King, Esq., C.M.G., His Majesty's Consul-General at Barcelona.
- George Arthur Drostan Ogilvie-Forbes, Esq., C.M.G., Counsellor at His Majesty's Embassy at Berlin, until recently His Majesty's Chargé d'Affaires at Valencia.
- William Henry Robinson, Esq., C.B.E., Assistant to the Principal Establishment Officer, Foreign Office.

=== Companions (CMG) ===
- Edgar Layton Bean, Esq., LL.B., Parliamentary Draftsman, State of South Australia.
- Kingsley Anketell Henderson, Esq., F.R.I.B.A., F.R.V.I.A. For public services in the Commonwealth of Australia.
- Lieutenant-Colonel Frank Higginson, Chief Administrative Officer for Central Europe, Imperial War Graves Commission.
- Robert Henry Hogg, Esq., O.B.E., M.B., President of the Branch in the Dominion of New Zealand of the British Medical Association.
- Thomas Dwyer Kelly, Esq., Under-Secretary and Comptroller of Accounts, Treasury, State of New South Wales.
- Lieutenant-Colonel the Honourable George Victor Lansell, V.D., Member of the Legislative Council, State of Victoria. For public and social welfare services.
- Arthur Edgar Leighton, Esq., F.I.C., Controller-General of Munitions Supply, Commonwealth of Australia.
- Moir Mackenzie, Esq., O.B.E., Manager of the Empire Division, Federation of British Industries.
- James Francis Murphy, Esq., Secretary, Department of Commerce, Commonwealth of Australia.
- Harold Eddey Priestman, Esq., Administrative Secretary to the High Commissioner for Basutoland, the Bechuanaland Protectorate and Swaziland.
- John Rigg, Esq. For services in connection with the Workers' Educational Association in the Dominion of New Zealand.
- Captain the Honourable William Sidney Senior, M.C., Minister of Mines and Public Works, Southern Rhodesia.
- Hugh Nimmo Tait, Esq., Assistant Secretary, Dominions Office.
- Harrie Dalrymple Wood, Esq., LL.B., Prothonotary of the Supreme Court, State of New South Wales.
- John Conrad Abraham, Esq., M.B.E., Colonial Administrative Service, Senior Provincial Commissioner, Nyasaland Protectorate.
- Francis Noel Ashley, Esq., Colonial Administrative Service, Resident Commissioner, British Solomon Islands Protectorate.
- Francis John Bagshawe, Esq., M.B.E., Colonial Administrative Service, Senior Provincial Commissioner, Tanganyika Territory.
- William Bartley, Esq., M.B.E., Colonial Administrative Service, President, Municipal Commissioners, Singapore, Straits Settlements.
- Cecil James Juxon Talbot Barton, Esq., O.B.E., Colonial Administrative Service, Colonial Secretary, Fiji.
- Alexander John Findlay, Esq., M.A., B.Sc. Colonial Agricultural Service, Director of Agriculture, Zanzibar.
- Charles Joseph Jeffries, Esq., O.B.E., Assistant Secretary, Colonial Office.
- John Edward Siegfried Merrick, Esq., O.B.E., Colonial Administrative Service, Chief Secretary, Uganda Protectorate.
- John William Moir, Esq. An early pioneer in the Nyasaland Protectorate.
- Hubert Ernest Newnham, Esq., V.D., Colonial Administrative Service, Principal Collector of Customs, and chairman, Colombo Port Commission, Ceylon.
- Frederick John Salmon, Esq., M.C., Commissioner of Lands and Surveys, Palestine.
- Norman Lockhart Smith, Esq., Colonial Administrative Service, Colonial Secretary, Hong Kong.
- Arthur Hudson Stocks, Esq., Colonial Administrative Service, Provincial Commissioner, Sierra Leone.
- Charles Francis Massy Swynnerton, Esq., Director of Tsetse Research, Tanganyika Territory.
- Gerald Charles Whiteley, Esq., Colonial Administrative Service, Deputy Chief Secretary, Nigeria.
- Charles Campbell Woolley, Esq., O.B.E., M.C., Colonial Administrative Service, Colonial Secretary, Jamaica.
- Arthur Francis Aveling, Esq., C.B.E., Acting Counsellor at His Majesty's Embassy at Warsaw.
- Sir Noel Hughes Havelock Charles, Bt., M.C., Counsellor at His Majesty's Embassy at Brussels.
- Colonel The Honourable Bertram Aloysius Forbes, O.B.E., until recently Assistant Inspector-General, Egyptian Army.
- Donald St. Clair Gainer, Esq., O.B.E., His Majesty's Consul-General at Munich.
- Oliver Charles Harvey, Esq., a Counsellor in the Foreign Office.
- Robert George Howe, Esq., Counsellor at His Majesty's Embassy at Peking.
- Walter St. Clair Howland Roberts, Esq., M.C.. an Acting Counsellor in the Foreign Office.
- Patrick Stratford Scrivener, Esq., First Secretary at His Majesty's Embassy at Angora.
- Frederick Watson, Esq., O.B.E., His Majesty's Consul-General at Philadelphia.

== Royal Victorian Order ==
=== Dames Grand Cross (GCVO) ===
- Evelyn Emily Mary, Duchess of Devonshire.
- Nina Cecilia, Countess of Strathmore and Kinghorne.

=== Knights Grand Cross (GCVO) ===
- Gilbert, Earl of Ancaster.
- Field-Marshal Sir William Riddell Birdwood, Bt., G.C.B., G.C.S.L, G.C.M.G., C.I.E., D.S.O.
- Lieutenant-General Sir George Sidney Clive, K.C.B., C.M.G., D.S.O.
- Air Vice-Marshal Sir Philip Woolcott Game, G.B.E., K.C.B., K.C.M.G., D.S.O.
- Major The Right Honourable Sir Alexander Henry Louis Hardinge, K.C.B., C.V.O., M.C.
- The Most Reverend and Right Honourable Cosmo Gordon Lang, D.D., Archbishop of Canterbury.
- The Right Honourable Sir John Allsebrook Simon, G.C.S.I., K.C.V.O., O.B.E., K.C., M.P.

=== Dames Commanders (DCVO) ===
- Lady Helen Cynthia Colville.
- Lady Helen Violet Graham.

=== Knights Commanders (KCVO) ===
- Major James Ulick Francis Canning Alexander, C.M.G., C.V.O., O.B.E.
- Colonel Sir John Atkins, K.C.M.G., M.B., F.R.C.S.
- George Nevile Maltby Bland, Esq., C.M.G.
- Major-General Bertram Norman Sergison-Brooke, C.B., C.M.G., D.S.O.
- The Honourable Gerald Henry Crofton Chichester, C.V.O.
- Brigadier-General Sir Smith Hill Child, Bt., C.B., C.M.G., C.V.O., D.S.O.
- Arthur William Steuart Cochrane, Esq., C.V.O.
- Sir Henry Walford Davies, C.V.O., O.B.E., Mus.Doc.
- Major-General Alan John Hunter, C.B., C.M.G., D.S.O., M.C.
- Robert Uchtred Eyre Knox, Esq., C.V.O., D.S.O.
- Edward Howard Marsh, Esq., C.B., C.M.G., C.V.O. (dated 11 February 1937).
- George Frederic Still, Esq., M.D., F.R.C.P.
- Lieutenant-Colonel Sir Hugh Stephenson Turnbull, K.B.E.

=== Commanders (CVO) ===
- Colin Mackenzie Black, Esq., W.S.
- The Honourable Lettice, Mrs. Geoffrey Bowlby.
- Ernest Bullock, Esq., Mus.Doc., F.R.C.O.
- Osmund Somers Cleverly, Esq.
- James Eggar, Esq., C.B.E.
- Colonel Lancelot Merivale Gibbs, D.S.O., M.C.
- The Honourable Arthur Jared Palmer Howard.
- Eric Cyril Egerton Leadbitter, Esq.
- Lieutenant-Colonel the Honourable Piers Walter Legh, C.M.G., C.I.E., M.V.O., O.B.E.
- Brigadier-General Robert McCalmont, D.S.O.
- Percy Metcalfe, Esq.
- Colonel William Kenyon Mitford, C.M.G.
- Owen Frederick Morshead, Esq., D.S.O., M.V.O., M.C.
- Lieutenant-Colonel Walter Gordon Neale, C.I.E.
- Lieutenant-Colonel Terence Edmund Gascoigne Nugent, M.V.O., M.C.
- Major Ronald Thomas Stanyforth, M.V.O., M.C.
- John Everard Stephenson, Esq., O.B.E.
- Norman Richard Coombe Warwick, Esq., M.V.O., O.B.E.
- Miss Edith Margaret Watson, C.B.E.
- Miss Dorothy Yorke.

=== Members of the Fourth Class (LVO) ===
- Charles Lambert Bayne, Esq.
- Miss Catherine Black, M.B.E., R.R.C.
- Lieutenant the Honourable Thomas William Edward Coke.
- Miss Rosina Davies, M.B.E., A.R.R.C.
- Cyril Frederick Gamon, Esq.
- Major Norman Wilmhurst Gwatkin.
- Major George Frederick Thomas Hopkins, M.V.O., M.C.
- Miss Cicely Howland, O.B.E.
- Lionel Logue, Esq.
- John Lowther, Esq.
- Ivison Stevenson Macadam, Esq., C.B.E.
- Charles Johns Mole, Esq., M.B.E.
- Captain Hugh Donald Ross, M.C.
- Captain Roy Dugdale Salmon, M.C.
- Major Christopher Ronald Spear, M.C.
- Henry Austin Strutt, Esq.
- Lieutenant-Colonel Edward John Patteson Travis Walker, O.B.E.

=== Members of the Fifth Class (MVO) ===
- William Arthur Chadwick, Esq.
- Alfred William Evans, Esq.
- Miss Helen Louisa Gardiner.
- Henry William Francis Godley, Esq.
- William Rose Jarvis, Esq.
- Joseph Walter Jones, Esq.
- John Thomas Lincoln Kendle, Esq.
- Herbert William Kirk, Esq.
- Charles Philip Waters, Esq.

== Order of the Indian Empire ==
=== Knights Grand Commander (GCIE) ===
- His Highness Maharao Raja Ishwari Singh Bahadur, Maharao Raja of Bundi, Rajputana.
- Sir Herbert William Emerson, K.C.S.I., C.I.E., C.B.E., Indian Civil Service, Governor of the Punjab.

=== Knights Commander (KCIE) ===
- Sir Charles Augustus Tegart, C.S.I., C.I.E., M.V.O., lately Member of the Council of India.
- Sir Thomas Guthrie Russell, Chief Commissioner of Railways.
- Raja Rao Bahadur Durjan Sal Singh, Raja of Khilchipur, Central India.
- Maharawal Shri Indrasinghji Pratapsinghji, Raja of Bansda, Gujarat States.
- Lieutenant-Colonel Trenchard Craven William Fowle, C.B.E., Indian Political Service, Political Resident in the Persian Gulf.
- Geoffrey Pownall Burton, Esq., C.I.E., Indian Civil Service, lately Member of the Executive Council of the Governor of the Central Provinces.
- Major-General Bertrand Richard Moberley, C.B., D.S.O., Indian Army, Commander, Lahore District.
- Major-General Clement Arthur Milward, C.B., C.I.E., C.B.E., D.S.Q., Indian Army, Commander, Lucknow District.
- His Highness Maharaja Sir Ejaz Rasul Khan, CSI, of Jahangirabad Raj, Barabanki District, United Provinces.
- Malik Sir Firoz Khan Noon, Barrister-at-Law, High Commissioner for India in London.

=== Companion (CIE) ===
- Rai Bahadur Kanak Lal Barua, lately Minister for Local Self-Government to the Governor of Assam.
- Colonel (Temporary Brigadier) Reginald Stuart Abbott, M.C., A.D.C., Indian Army, Commander, Kohat Brigade, India
- Colonel (Honorary Brigadier) Philip William Lilian Broke-Smith, D.S.O., O.B.E., British Service (Retired List), lately Chief Engineer, Eastern Command, India.
- Colonel (Temporary Brigadier) Hollis Martin Burrows, Indian Army, Commander, Ferozepore Brigade Area.
- Colonel (Temporary Brigadier) William Elworthy Kidner, M.C., Chief Engineer, Eastern Command, lately Deputy Engineer-in-Chief (Works), Army Headquarters, India.
- John Francis Blakiston, Esq., Director-General of Archaeology in India.
- Eric Cecil Ansorge, Esq., Indian Civil Service, Commissioner of the Tirhut Division, Bihar.
- James Downing Penny, Esq., Indian Civil Service, Officiating Commissioner, Rawalpindi Division, Punjab.
- Donald Macfarlane Esq., M.Inst. C.E., Indian Service of Engineers, Chief Engineer and Secretary to the Government of the Punjab in the Public Works Department, Buildings and Roads Branch.
- George Mabyn Ross, Esq., B.A.I., Indian Service of Engineers, Chief Engineer and Secretary to the Government of the North-West Frontier Province in the Public Works Department.
- Arthur Allen Waugh, Esq., Indian Civil Service, Secretary to the Government of the United Provinces in the Revenue Department.
- James Richard Blair, Esq., Indian Civil Service, Additional Secretary to the Government of Bengal in the Political Department.
- Colonel John Taylor, D.S.O., M.D., V.H.S., Indian Medical Service, Director, Central Research Institute, Kasauli.
- Group Captain Norman Howard Bottomley, A.F.C., Officer Commanding No. 1 (Indian) Group, Royal Air Force, India
- Colonel Cecil Alexander Boyle, D.S.O., Indian Army, Adviser in Languages and Secretary, Board of Examiners, General Staff Branch, Army Headquarters, India.
- John Mellor Bottomley, Esq., Indian Educational Service, Director of Public Instruction, Bengal.
- Lieutenant-Colonel George Frederick Joseph Paterson, O.B.E., M.C., Indian Army (Supernumerary List), Director of Military Lands and Cantonments, Defence Department.
- Frank Ware, (Esq., F.R.C.V.S., Officiating Expert Adviser in Animal Husbandry to the Imperial Council of Agricultural Research.
- Lieutenant-Colonel Arnort Edward Joseph Connell McDowell, Indian Police, Inspector General of Police, Bihar.
- Emil Athol Owen Perkin, Esq., Indian Police, Inspector-General of Police, Orissa.
- Daniel Healy, Esq., Indian Police, InspectorGeneral of Police, Sind.
- Lieutenant-Colonel John de la Hay Gordon, O.B.E., M.C., Indian Political Service.
- Walter Robert George Smith, Esq., Barristerat-Law, Indian Police, Commissioner of Police, Bombay.
- Vyakarana Narahari Rao, Esq., Indian Audit and Accounts Service, Additional Deputy Secretary to the Crown Representative.
- Frederick Sayers, Esq., Indian Police, Deputy Inspector-General of Police, Madras.
- Lieutenant-Colonel Clive Newcomb, B.Ch., D.M. (Oxpn.), M.R.C.S. (Eng.), L.R.C.P. (Lond.), F.I.C., F.C.S., Indian Medical Service, Chemical Examiner to the Government of Madras, and Principal, Medical College, Madras.
- Lieutenant-Colonel Ronald Herbert Candy, M.B., B.S. (Lond.), M.R.C.S. (Eng.), L.R.C.P. (Lond.), Indian Medical Service, Civil Surgeon, Poona, Bombay.
- Khan Bahadur Maulvi Abdul Aziz, Indian Service of Engineers, Superintending Engineer, Public Works Department, Irrigation Branch, United Provinces.
- Charles Holditch Bristow, Esq., J.P., Indian Civil Service, Secretary to the Governor of Bombay.
- Samuel Harrison Yardley Oulsnam, Esq., M.C., Indian Civil Service, Reforms Officer to the Government of the Central Provinces.
- Major Alfred Edward Cartmel, M.M.. Indian Army, Commandant, Northern Shan States Battalion, Burma Frontier Force, Lashio, Northern Shan States, Burma.
- Basil Martin Sullivan, Esq., O.B.E., Specialist Officer in the Public Works Department, Superintending Architect, Architectural Circle, Punjab.
- Charles William Ayers, Esq., Principal Inspector of Taxes, Board of Inland Revenue, Somerset House, London.
- Ernest Muir, Esq, M.D., F.R.C.S. (Edin.), LL.D., General and Medical Secretary, British Empire Leprosy Relief Association.
- John James Crosbie Paterson, Esq., Locomotive and Carriage Superintendent, Bombay, Baroda and Central India Railway, Bombay.
- Maung Set, Indian Audit and Accounts Service, Commissioner, Rangoon Corporation, Burma.

== Order of the British Empire ==
=== Knight Grand Cross (GBE) ===
Military Division

- Admiral Sir Frederic Charles Dreyer, K.C.B., C.B.E.
- General Sir Archibald Rice Cameron, K.C.B., C.M.G., Retired Pay, Colonel, The Black Watch (Royal Highland Regiment), late General Officer, Commanding-in-Chief, Scottish Command, and Governor of Edinburgh Castle.

Civil Division

- Sir Ernest John Strohmenger, K.B.E., C.B., lately deputy chairman, Unemployment Assistance Board.
- Lieutenant-Colonel His Highness Fakhr-ud-Daulah Nawab Sir-Muhammad Iftikhar Ali Khan Bahadur, Saulat Jang, K.C.I.E., Nawab of Jaora, Central India.

=== Dame Grand Cross (GBE) ===
Civil Division

- Enid Muriel, Mrs. Lyons. For public services rendered in the Commonwealth of Australia.

=== Dames Commanders (DBE) ===
Civil Division

- Mary, Mrs. Graham Browne, (Miss Marie Tempest). For services to the stage.
- Geraldine Southall, Mrs. Cadbury, J.P. For public and philanthropic services in Birmingham.
- Ellen Frances, Mrs. Pinsent, C.B.E., late Senior Commissioner, Board of Control.
- Miss Violet Edith Wills. For public and philanthropic services.
- Edith Muriel, Lady Anderson. For public and social welfare services in Newfoundland and the State of New South Wales.
- Margaret, Baroness Strickland. For philanthropic services in Malta.

=== Knights Commanders (KBE) ===
Military Division

- Vice-Admiral Henry John Studholme Brownrigg, C.B., D.S.O.
- Vice-Admiral James Pipon, C.B., C.M.G., M.V.O., O.B.E. (Retired).
- Major-General Horace de Courcy Martelli, C.B., D.S.O., late Royal Artillery, Lieutenant-Governor and Commanding The Troops, Jersey District.
- Major-General Edward Nicholson Broadbent, C.B., C.M.G., D.S.O., late The King's Own Scottish Borderers, Lieutenant-Governor-and Commanding The Troops, Guernsey and Alderney District.
- Major-General William James Norman Cooke-Collis, C.B., C.M.G., D.S.O., late The Royal Ulster Rifles, General Officer Commanding Northern Ireland District.
- Major-General Andrew Jameson McCulloch, C.B., D.S.O., D.C.M., Colonel, The Highland Light Infantry - (City of Glasgow Regiment), Commander, 52nd (Lowland) Division, Scottish Command, late General Officer Commanding the Troops, Malta.
- Air Vice-Marshal Alfred William Iredell, C.B., M.R.C.S., L.R.C.P., K.H.P., Royal Air Force.

Civil Division

- James Sidney Barnes, Esq., C.B., O.B.E., Deputy Secretary, Admiralty.
- Gerald Bain Canny, Esq., C.B., deputy chairman, Board of Inland Revenue.
- Evelyn John Maude, Esq., C.B., Deputy Secretary, Ministry of Health.
- James Stirling Ross, Esq., C.B., C.B.E., Deputy Secretary, Air Ministry.
- Robert Vaughan, Esq. For political and public services in Merionethshire.
- George Bernard Lomas-Walker, Esq. For political and public services in the West Riding of Yorkshire.
- Henry Herbert Couzens, Esq., a British subject, until recently resident in Rio de Janeiro.
- Colonel John Chappell Ward, C.M.G., C.I.E., D.S.O., M.B.E., Director of the Port of Basra and Director of Navigation, Iraqi Government.
- The Honourable John Richards Harris, M.D., Minister of Public Instruction and Minister of Public Health, State of Victoria.
- Sir James Gordon McDonald, O.B.E. For services to Southern Rhodesia.
- John Sanderson, Esq. For services to the Commonwealth of Australia.
- Sir Navroji Bapuji Saklatvala, C.I.E., Director, Messrs. Tata Sons, Ltd., Bombay.
- Rao Bahadur Madhorao Ganesh Deshpande, C.B.E., chairman and managing director of the Central Provinces and Berar Provincial Co-operative Bank, Ltd., Nagpur, Central Provinces.
- Nana Osei Agyeman Prempeh II, Asantehene, Gold Coast.
- Raja Abdul Aziz ibni al-marhum Raja Musa, Raja Muda of Perak, Federated Malay States. (Honorary)
- His Highness Daudi Chwa, K.C.M.G., Kabaka of Buganda, Uganda Protectorate. (Honorary)
- His Highness Tengku Ismail, Tengku Mahkpta of Johore, Malay States. (Honorary)

=== Commanders (CBE) ===
Civil division

- Madeline Pamela Constance Blanche, Alderman Mrs. Adeane, J.P. For public services in Cambridgeshire.
- George Andrew, M.A., F.R.S.E., H.M. Senior Chief Inspector of Schools, Scottish Education Department.
- Samuel Armstrong, J.P., a Member of the Wheat Commission, Past President of the Council of the National Association of British and Irish Millers.
- Robert Claude Ashby, Chairman of the Southampton Juvenile Organisations Committee.
- George Percival Best, Assistant Commissioner of Crown Lands.
- William Blackwood, J.P. For political and public services.
- William Guy Nott-Bower, Assistant Under-Secretary for Mines.
- Arthur Lyon Bowley, M.A., Sc.D., D.Sc., F.B.A., Emeritus Professor of Statistics in the University of London.
- Walter Carter, Assistant Secretary, Board of Trade.
- Professor Edgar Leigh Collis, M.D., M.R.C.P., M.R.C.S., J.P., Emeritus Professor of Preventive Medicine in the University of Wales.
- George Carter Cossar, M.C., L.R.C.P.E., L.R.C.S.E., L.R.F.P.S., Founder of the Todhills Farm Colony and the Craigielinn Training Farm for the training of boys in agriculture.
- Alwyn Douglas Crow, O.B.E., Sc.D., F.Inst.P., Director of Ballistics Research, Research Department, Royal Arsenal, Woolwich.
- Bernard Richard Meirion Darwin, For services to literature and sport.
- Britannia Margaret, Lady Davies. For political and public services in Cardiff.
- Milner Gray, M.P. for Mid-Beds, 1929–31. Parliamentary Secretary to the Ministry of Labour, 1931. For political and public services.
- Oswald Allen Harker, Administrative Assistant, Foreign Office.
- Walter Fred Harris, F.C.A., Chairman of the Fishing Vessels War Risks Compensation Committee.
- Albert Edward Holmes, Secretary, Printing and Kindred Trades Federation. Joint Secretary of the Joint Industrial Council of the Printing and Allied Trades of Great Britain and Ireland
- John Hutcheson, For political and public services in Roxburgh and Selkirk.
- Professor Thomas Gwynn Jones, M.A.,.Professor of Welsh Literature, University College of Wales, Aberystwyih.
- Alexander Boyne King, J.P. For political and public services in Glasgow.
- Alderman Ernest Lambert. For political and public services in the East Riding of Yorkshire.
- Walter Sydney Liddall, J.P, M.P., M.P. for Lincoln. For political and public services.
- Thomas Lochhead, C.A., Chief Accountant, British Broadcasting Corporation.
- Hugh Latimer McCready, D.L., Chairman of the Loans Advisory Committee, Northern Ireland.
- Commander (Acting Captain) Frederick William Mace, O.B.E., R.N.R. (Retired), Marine Surveyor and Water Bailiff to the Mersey Docks and Harbour Board.
- Walter Alexander Magill, I.S.O., Secretary, Ministry of Home Affairs, Northern Ireland.
- George Gillies Mennell, Secretary and Assistant Commissioner, Civil Service Commission.
- Miss Mary Clara Sophia Neal, J.P. For services in connection with the revival of folk songs and dances.
- Alderman Frank Nicholson, J.P., Chairman of the Sunderland Local Employment Committee.
- John Reginald Jutsum Passmore, Chief Inspector of Training, Ministry of Labour.
- John Ronald Peddie, M.B.E., D.Litt., Executive Officer, National Committee for the Training of Teachers in Scotland.
- Charles William Reeve, chairman and managing director of the Associated Equipment Company. For services to the Air Ministry.
- George Riddle, President of the Co-operative Congress.
- Llewellyn Roberts, M.I.Mar.E., a Chief Engineer, Cunard White Star Steamship Company.
- William Robert Locke Spence, General Secretary of the National Union of Seamen.
- Robert Hill Tolerton, D.S.O., M.C., Assistant Secretary, Roads Department, Ministry of Transport.
- Brigadier James Whitehead, C.M.G., D.S.O., Assistant Commissioner, Metropolitan Police.
- Archibald Kennedy Wilson, Chief Constable of Liverpool.

Overseas

- Robert Rowland Appleby, a British subject resident in New York.
- Mary Ethel Winifred, Lady Barton, O.B.E., wife of Sir Sidney Barton, until recently His Majesty's Minister at Addis Ababa.
- The Reverend Douglas William Bruce, a British subject resident in Buenos Aires.
- William Sherlock Dupree, a British subject resident in Hankow.
- Miralai Arthur William Green Bey, until recently Governor of the Western Desert, Egyptian Frontier Districts Administration.
- Ralph Cornwallis Stevenson, His Majesty's Consul at Bilbao.

Commonwealth

- William James Carew, Secretary of the Commission of Government and Secretary for Home Affairs, Newfoundland.
- George Stanley Colman, Member, Pastoral Research Council, Commonwealth of Australia.
- Arthur Malcolm Eedy, President of the Insurance Institute, State of New South Wales.
- Jessie Isabel, Mrs. Henderson. For social welfare services in the State of Victoria.
- Te Puea Herangi, a Māori Princess of Ngāruawāhia, Dominion of New Zealand. For social welfare services.
- Raymond Douglas Huish, For services to ex-servicemen in the Commonwealth of Australia.
- Miss Celia Macdonald of the Isles, O.B.E. For services in connection with hospitality for Dominion students in London.
- James Perrins Major, M.D., B.S., Honorary Secretary of the Branch in the State of Victoria of the British Medical Association.
- Henry Ernest Moston, Assistant Secretary, Department of Labour, Dominion of New Zealand.
- Miss Gladys Sydney Pott, O.B.E. For services in connection with the settlement overseas of British women.
- Robert Fitzroy Sanderson, Member of the Federal Advisory Committee on Eastern Trade, Commonwealth of Australia.
- Captain Donald Petrie Simson, O.B.E., Honorary Secretary, British Empire Service League
- M. R. Ry. Bezwada Ramachandra Reddi Garu, lately President, Legislative Council, Madras.
- Susil Chandra Sen, Solicitor to the Central Government at Calcutta.
- Khwaja Shahabuddin, Member of the Bengal Legislative Assembly, chairman, Dacca District Board, Bengal.
- George Herman Raschen, Member of the Sind Legislative Assembly, chairman, Karachi Chamber of Commerce, Sind.
- Harry Willoughby Oddin Taylor, O.B.E., A.C.G.I., A.M.I.C.E., Indian Service of Engineers, Superintending Engineer (Irrigation) and Joint Secretary to the Agent to the Governor-General in Baluchistan in the Public Works Department.
- John Humphrey Blackwell, M.C., Manager of the Delhi Office, The Burma Shell Company of India, Ltd.
- John Maurice Kilburn, lately chairman, Assam Branch of the Indian Tea Association, Assam.
- Edgar Percy Stocker, Deputy Managing Director, Imperial Bank of India
- Lieutenant-Colonel Robert Deane, O.B.E., Colonial Police Service, Inspector-General of Police and Superintendent of Prisons, Mauritius.
- Lieutenant-Colonel George Cruickshank Griffiths, C.M.G. For public services in Kenya.
- Lieutenant-Colonel Horace Cyril Benjamin Hickling, D.S.O., M.C. For public services in Trinidad.
- Peter Sinclair Hunter, M.B., Municipal Health Officer, Singapore, Straits Settlements.
- James Lochhead, O.B.E., M.D., F.R.C.S., Colonial Medical Service, Senior Medical Officer, Gibraltar.
- Eric Olawolu Moore, For public services in Nigeria.
- George Laurie Pile, For public services in Barbados.
- Lieutenant-Colonel Cecil Rae. For public services in the Federated Malay States.
- William Francis Stephens, For public services in Seychelles.
- William Stewart, For public services in the Tanganyika Territory

=== Officers (OBE) ===
- James Martin Stagg, Esq., D.Sc., Senior Technical Officer, Meteorological Office, Air Ministry

== Companions of Honour ==
- Nancy Witcher, Viscountess Astor, Member of Parliament for the Sutton Division
- The Reverend Melbourn Evans Aubrey, Moderator of the Federal Council of the Evangelical Free Churches. General Secretary of the Baptist Union of Great Britain and Ireland
- Miss Gwendoline Elizabeth Davies. For educational, social and philanthropic services in Wales
- John Alfred Spender, Esq For services to literature and journalism
- Charles Thomson Rees Wilson, For services to experimental physics
