= Harold Whitehouse =

Harold Whitehouse may refer to:

- Harold C. Whitehouse, American architect
- Harold Leslie Keer Whitehouse, British botanist and bryologist
- Harold Beckwith Whitehouse, professor of midwifery and diseases of women
