= 1935 Liverpool City Council election =

1935 English local government election

- 1 November 1935

40 cnoucillors' seats were up for election

Elections to Liverpool City Council were held on 1 November 1935. One third of the council seats were up for election, the term of office of each councillor being three years.

Seven of the forty seats up for election were uncontested.

After the election, the composition of the council was:

| Party | Councillors | ± | Aldermen | Total |
|---|---|---|---|---|
| Conservative | ?? | ?? | ?? | ?? |
| Labour | ?? | ?? | ?? | ?? |
| Liberal | ?? | ?? | ?? | ?? |
| Independent | ?? | ?? | ?? | ?? |
| Protestant | ?? | ?? | ?? | ?? |

== Election result ==
Liverpool local election result 1935
| Party | Seats | Gains | Losses | Net gain/loss | Seats % | Votes % | Votes | +/− |
|---|---|---|---|---|---|---|---|---|
| Conservative | 20 | | | | | 45% | 63,229 | |
| Labour | 15 | | | | | 47% | 67,209 | |
| Liberal | 3 | | | | | 4.4% | 6,295 | |
| Independent | 1 | | | | | 1.9% | 2,746 | |
| Protestant | 1 | | | | | 1.8% | 2,574 | |

== Ward results ==
* - Councillor seeking re-election

Comparisons are made with the 1932 election results.

=== Abercromby ===
No. 9 Abercromby
| Party | Candidate | Votes | % | ±% |
|---|---|---|---|---|
| Conservative | Charles William Bailey * | 2,118 | 50% | |
| Labour | John Reginald Bevins | 2,081 | 50% | |
| Majority | | 37 | | |
| Registered electors | | 9,574 | | |
| Turnout | | 4,199 | 44% | |
| Conservative hold | | Swing | | |

=== Aigburth ===
No. 17 Aigburth
| Party | Candidate | Votes | % | ±% |
|---|---|---|---|---|
| Conservative | Vere Egerton Cotton O.B.E. * | 2,699 | 60% | |
| Liberal | Arthur Donald Dennis | 1,780 | 40% | |
| Majority | | 919 | | |
| Registered electors | | 10,095 | | |
| Turnout | | 4,479 | 44% | |
| Conservative hold | | Swing | | |

=== Allerton ===
No. 35 Allerton
| Party | Candidate | Votes | % | ±% |
|---|---|---|---|---|
| Conservative | John William Jones * | 1,968 | 71% | |
| Labour | Cedric Ernest Hargreaves | 795 | 29% | |
| Majority | | 1,173 | | |
| Registered electors | | 5,250 | | |
| Turnout | | 53% | | |
| Conservative hold | | Swing | | |

=== Anfield ===
No. 29 Anfield
| Party | Candidate | Votes | % | ±% |
|---|---|---|---|---|
| Liberal | Alfred Rennick Gates * | unopposed | | |
| Registered electors | | | | |
| Liberal hold | | Swing | | |

=== Breckfield ===
No. 30 Breckfield
| Party | Candidate | Votes | % | ±% |
|---|---|---|---|---|
| Conservative | Mrs. Ada Martha Burton * | 2,294 | 55% | |
| Labour | Alfred Walker Boothman | 1,895 | 45% | |
| Majority | | 399 | | |
| Registered electors | | 10,292 | | |
| Turnout | | 4,189 | 41% | |
| Conservative hold | | Swing | | |

=== Brunswick ===
No. 11 Brunswick
| Party | Candidate | Votes | % | ±% |
|---|---|---|---|---|
| Labour | Lawrence King * | unopposed | | |
| Registered electors | | | | |
| Labour hold | | Swing | | |

=== Castle Street ===
No. 7 Castle Street
| Party | Candidate | Votes | % | ±% |
|---|---|---|---|---|
| Conservative | James Bennett O.B.E. | unopposed | | |
| Registered electors | | | | |
| Conservative hold | | Swing | | |

=== Childwall ===
No. 38 Childwall
| Party | Candidate | Votes | % | ±% |
|---|---|---|---|---|
| Liberal | William John Tristram | 1,813 | 82% | |
| Labour | Arthur Andrew Arnot | 385 | 18% | |
| Majority | | 1,428 | | |
| Registered electors | | 4,554 | | |
| Turnout | | 2,198 | 48% | |
| Liberal gain from Conservative | | Swing | | |

=== Croxteth ===
No. 40 Croxteth
| Party | Candidate | Votes | % | ±% |
|---|---|---|---|---|
| Labour | George Henry Boothman * | unopposed | | |
| Registered electors | | | | |
| Labour hold | | Swing | | |

=== Dingle ===
No. 12 Dingle
| Party | Candidate | Votes | % | ±% |
|---|---|---|---|---|
| Labour | Charles Matthew Belk * | 4,187 | 55% | |
| Conservative | Mrs. Nancy Proctor | 3,365 | 45% | |
| Majority | | 822 | | |
| Registered electors | | 15,215 | | |
| Turnout | | 7,552 | 50% | |
| Labour hold | | Swing | | |

=== Edge Hill ===
No. 18 Edge Hill
| Party | Candidate | Votes | % | ±% |
|---|---|---|---|---|
| Labour | Alexander Griffin * | 3,443 | 60% | |
| Conservative | Bertram Saul Morgan | 2,325 | 40% | |
| Majority | | 1,118 | | |
| Registered electors | | 12,745 | | |
| Turnout | | 5,768 | | |
| Labour hold | | Swing | | |

=== Everton ===
No. 21 Everton
| Party | Candidate | Votes | % | ±% |
|---|---|---|---|---|
| Labour | John Braddock * | 3,936 | 74% | |
| Conservative | Murray Rowland Fletcher Rogers | 1,372 | 26% | |
| Majority | | 2,564 | | |
| Registered electors | | 12,831 | | |
| Turnout | | 5,308 | 41% | |
| Labour hold | | Swing | | |

=== Exchange ===
No. 5 Exchange
| Party | Candidate | Votes | % | ±% |
|---|---|---|---|---|
| Independent | Thomas Patrick Staunton * | 757 | 63% | |
| Labour | Alfred Donohue | 438 | 37% | |
| Majority | | 319 | | |
| Registered electors | | 2,351 | | |
| Turnout | | 1,195 | 51% | |
| Independent gain from Centre | | | | |

=== Fairfield ===
No. 31 Fairfield
| Party | Candidate | Votes | % | ±% |
|---|---|---|---|---|
| Conservative | John Barry * | 2,595 | 62% | |
| Labour | Richard Thomas Hughes | 1,573 | 38% | |
| Majority | | 1,022 | | |
| Registered electors | | 10,430 | | |
| Turnout | | 4,168 | 40% | |
| Conservative hold | | Swing | | |

=== Fazakerley ===
No. 27 Fazakerley
| Party | Candidate | Votes | % | ±% |
|---|---|---|---|---|
| Conservative | Frederick Baxter | 2,505 | 52% | |
| Labour | Mrs. Sarah Ann Demain | 2,286 | 48% | |
| Majority | | 219 | | |
| Registered electors | | 11,637 | | |
| Turnout | | 4,791 | 41% | |
| Conservative hold | | Swing | | |

=== Garston ===
No. 37 Garston
| Party | Candidate | Votes | % | ±% |
|---|---|---|---|---|
| Labour | William Sydney Dytor * | 2,766 | 59% | |
| Conservative | Alfred Midwood Proffit | 1,939 | 41% | |
| Majority | | 827 | | |
| Registered electors | | 7,920 | | |
| Turnout | | 4,705 | 59% | |
| Labour hold | | Swing | | |

=== Granby ===
No. 14 Granby
| Party | Candidate | Votes | % | ±% |
|---|---|---|---|---|
| Labour | Charles Edward Burke | 2,191 | 53% | |
| Liberal | Henry Humphreys Jones | 1,949 | 47% | |
| Majority | | 242 | | |
| Registered electors | | 9,760 | | |
| Turnout | | 4,140 | 42% | |
| Labour gain from Independent | | Swing | | |

=== Great George ===
No. 10 Great George
| Party | Candidate | Votes | % | ±% |
|---|---|---|---|---|
| Labour | Percy Ernest Sherwin * | 1,403 | 59% | |
| Conservative | Dudley Richmond-Jones | 964 | 41% | |
| Majority | | 439 | | |
| Registered electors | | 4,771 | | |
| Turnout | | 2,367 | 50% | |
| Labour hold | | Swing | | |

=== Kensington ===
No. 19 Kensington
| Party | Candidate | Votes | % | ±% |
|---|---|---|---|---|
| Conservative | Edward Clouston Ralph Littler-Jones * | 2,753 | 60% | |
| Labour | Thomas Ernest Martin | 1,844 | 40% | |
| Majority | | 909 | | |
| Registered electors | | 11,030 | | |
| Turnout | | 4,597 | 42% | |
| Conservative hold | | Swing | | |

=== Kirkdale ===
No. 24 Kirkdale
| Party | Candidate | Votes | % | ±% |
|---|---|---|---|---|
| Labour | William Henry Barton * | 4,259 | 55% | |
| Conservative | Arthur Mackson Brown | 3,494 | 45% | |
| Majority | | 765 | | |
| Registered electors | | 16,787 | | |
| Turnout | | 7,753 | 46% | |
| Labour hold | | Swing | | |

=== Low Hill ===
No. 20 Low Hill
| Party | Candidate | Votes | % | ±% |
|---|---|---|---|---|
| Labour | Fred Robinson * | 2,783 | 53% | |
| Conservative | David Rowan | 2,422 | 47% | |
| Majority | | 361 | | |
| Registered electors | | 11,056 | | |
| Turnout | | 5,205 | 47% | |
| Labour hold | | Swing | | |

=== Much Woolton ===
No. 36 Much Woolton
| Party | Candidate | Votes | % | ±% |
|---|---|---|---|---|
| Conservative | Isaac Robinson | 1,013 | 51% | |
| Independent | Mrs. Caroline Whiteley * | 853 | 43% | |
| Liberal | John Richard Jones | 123 | 6% | |
| Majority | | 160 | | |
| Registered electors | | 2,747 | | |
| Turnout | | 1,989 | 72% | |
| Conservative gain from Independent | | Swing | | |

=== Netherfield ===
No. 22 Netherfield
| Party | Candidate | Votes | % | ±% |
|---|---|---|---|---|
| Conservative | William John Matthew Clark | 3,451 | 57% | |
| Labour | George Chadwick * | 2,505 | 42% | |
| Independent Labour and Protestant | Joshua George Perkins | 68 | 1% | |
| Majority | | 946 | | |
| Registered electors | | 11,301 | | |
| Turnout | | 6,024 | 53% | |
| Conservative gain from Labour | | Swing | | |

=== North Scotland ===
No. 2 North Scotland
| Party | Candidate | Votes | % | ±% |
|---|---|---|---|---|
| Labour | Henry Gaskin | 2,870 | 86% | |
| Independent | Mrs. Margaret Macfarlane * | 465 | 14% | |
| Majority | | 2,405 | | |
| Registered electors | | 8,360 | | |
| Turnout | | 3,335 | 40% | |
| Labour hold | | Swing | | |

=== Old Swan ===
No. 32 Old Swan
| Party | Candidate | Votes | % | ±% |
|---|---|---|---|---|
| Conservative | Charles Harold Leftwich | 3,913 | 51% | |
| Labour | Thomas Williamson * | 3,784 | 49% | |
| Majority | | 129 | | |
| Registered electors | | 18,115 | | |
| Turnout | | 7,697 | 42% | |
| Conservative hold | | Swing | | |

=== Prince's Park ===
No. 13 Prince's Park
| Party | Candidate | Votes | % | ±% |
|---|---|---|---|---|
| Conservative | Charles Rowland Clare * | 2,746 | 53% | |
| Labour | Joseph Schofield Ogden | 2,406 | 47% | |
| Majority | | 340 | | |
| Registered electors | | 9,850 | | |
| Turnout | | 5,152 | 52% | |
| Conservative hold | | Swing | | |

=== Sandhills ===
No. 1 Sandhills
| Party | Candidate | Votes | % | ±% |
|---|---|---|---|---|
| Labour | Stanley Part | Unopposed | | |
| Registered electors | | | | |
| Labour hold | | Swing | | |

=== St. Anne's ===
No. 6 St. Anne's
| Party | Candidate | Votes | % | ±% |
|---|---|---|---|---|
| Labour | Samuel Sydney Silverman * | 2,425 | 79% | |
| Conservative | Thomas Henry Nabb | 650 | 21% | |
| Majority | | 1,775 | | |
| Registered electors | | 7,725 | | |
| Turnout | | 3,075 | 40% | |
| Labour hold | | Swing | | |

=== St. Domingo ===
No. 23 St. Domingo
| Party | Candidate | Votes | % | ±% |
|---|---|---|---|---|
| Protestant | Mrs. Mary Jane Longbottom * | 2,506 | 55% | |
| Labour | George Thompson Holliday | 2,024 | 45% | |
| Majority | | 482 | | |
| Registered electors | | 11,382 | | |
| Turnout | | 4,530 | 40% | |
| Protestant hold | | Swing | | |

=== St. Peter's ===
No. 8 St. Peter's
| Party | Candidate | Votes | % | ±% |
|---|---|---|---|---|
| Liberal | John Bennion | 630 | 57% | |
| Labour | Laurence William Kennan | 482 | 43% | |
| Majority | | 148 | | |
| Registered electors | | 2,504 | | |
| Turnout | | 1,112 | 44% | |
| Liberal hold | | Swing | | |

=== Sefton Park East ===
No. 15 Sefton Park East
| Party | Candidate | Votes | % | ±% |
|---|---|---|---|---|
| Conservative | Michael Cory Dixon * | unopposed | | |
| Registered electors | | | | |
| Conservative hold | | Swing | | |

=== Sefton Park West ===
No. 16 Sefton Park West
| Party | Candidate | Votes | % | ±% |
|---|---|---|---|---|
| Conservative | William James Austin | unopposed | | |
| Registered electors | | | | |
| Conservative hold | | Swing | | |

=== South Scotland ===
No. 3 South Scotland
| Party | Candidate | Votes | % | ±% |
|---|---|---|---|---|
| Labour | John Sheehan * | 2,625 | 93% | |
| Independent | Thomas Patrick Sheehan | 187 | 7% | |
| Majority | | 2,438 | | |
| Registered electors | | 8,308 | | |
| Turnout | | 2,812 | 34% | |
| Labour hold | | Swing | | |

=== Vauxhall ===
No. 4 Vauxhall
| Party | Candidate | Votes | % | ±% |
|---|---|---|---|---|
| Labour | Arthur Brian Hoer * | 877 | 80% | |
| Independent | Mrs. Martha Veronica Fernie | 220 | 20% | |
| Majority | | 657 | | |
| Registered electors | | 3,605 | | |
| Turnout | | 1,097 | 30% | |
| Labour hold | | Swing | | |

=== Walton ===
No. 25 Walton
| Party | Candidate | Votes | % | ±% |
|---|---|---|---|---|
| Conservative | John Harold Irwin * | 4,374 | 61% | |
| Labour | Mervyn Forbes Hudson | 2,852 | 39% | |
| Majority | | 1,552 | | |
| Registered electors | | 16,460 | | |
| Turnout | | 7,226 | 44% | |
| Conservative hold | | Swing | | |

=== Warbreck ===
No. 26 Warbreck
| Party | Candidate | Votes | % | ±% |
|---|---|---|---|---|
| Conservative | James Jude * | 3,003 | 63% | |
| Labour | Albert Smitton | 1,470 | 31% | |
| Independent | William Fry | 264 | 6% | |
| Majority | | 1,553 | | |
| Registered electors | | 13,188 | | |
| Turnout | | 4,737 | 36% | |
| Conservative hold | | Swing | | |

=== Wavertree ===
No. 34 Wavertree
| Party | Candidate | Votes | % | ±% |
|---|---|---|---|---|
| Conservative | Stanley Ronald Williams | 4,337 | 64% | |
| Labour | John Gibbon Elliott | 2,445 | 36% | |
| Majority | | 1,892 | | |
| Registered electors | | 15,480 | | |
| Turnout | | 6,782 | 44% | |
| Conservative hold | | Swing | | |

=== Wavertree West ===
No. 33 Wavertree West
| Party | Candidate | Votes | % | ±% |
|---|---|---|---|---|
| Conservative | Charlton Thomson * | 2,152 | 59% | |
| Labour | Daniel Whelan | 1,508 | 41% | |
| Majority | | 644 | | |
| Registered electors | | 8,833 | | |
| Turnout | | 3,660 | 41% | |
| Conservative hold | | Swing | | |

=== West Derby ===
No. 28 West Derby
| Party | Candidate | Votes | % | ±% |
|---|---|---|---|---|
| Conservative | Albert Morrow * | 4,777 | 64% | |
| Labour | Miss Mabel Kennedy | 2,671 | 36% | |
| Majority | | 2,106 | | |
| Registered electors | | 19,521 | | |
| Turnout | | 7,448 | 38% | |
| Conservative hold | | Swing | | |

== Aldermanic elections ==
=== Aldermanic election 9 November 1935 ===
The terms of office of twenty aldermen expired, so there was an election to replace these positions at the council meeting on 9 November 1935.

This was the first Aldermanic election since the Local Government Act, 1933, which disenfranchised aldermen from voting in aldermanic elections. Only councillors were eligible to vote in the aldermanic elections. Although only Councillors had voted in aldermanic elections to Liverpool City Council for some years.

* - re-elected alderman.

| Party | Alderman | Votes | |
|---|---|---|---|
| Conservative | Harold Edward Davies * | 64 | elected |
| Conservative | Thomas Dowd * | 64 | elected |
| Conservative | Mabel Fletcher * | 64 | elected |
| Conservative | Edwin Haigh * | 64 | elected |
| Conservative | Maxwell Hyslop Maxwell C.B. C.B.E. * | 64 | elected |
| Conservative | Henry Morley Miller * | 64 | elected |
| Conservative | William Muirhead * | 64 | elected |
| Conservative | John George Paris * | 64 | elected |
| Conservative | George Miller Platt * | 64 | elected |
| Conservative | Richard Rutherford * | 64 | elected |
| Conservative | Frank Campbell Wilson * | 64 | elected |
| Conservative | Councillor Thomas Henry Burton | 63 | elected |
| Independent | Joseph Belger * | 59 | elected |
| Protestant | Councillor Rev. Harry Dixon Longbottom | 58 | elected |
| Labour | Frederick Thomas Richardson * | 52 | elected |
| Labour | Sir James Sexton C.B.E. * | 51 | elected |
| Labour | Herbert Edward Rose * | 49 | elected |
| Labour | William Albert Robinson * | 47 | elected |
| Labour | David Gilbert Logan * | 45 | elected |
| Labour | Henry Walker * | 45 | elected |
| Labour | Councillor Lawrence King | 44 | unelected |
| Labour | Councillor John Wolfe Tone Morrissey | 44 | unelected |
| Labour | Councillor Joseph Jackson Cleary | 43 | unelected |
| Labour | Councillor Alexander Griffin | 43 | unelected |
| Labour | Councillor Thomas Hanley | 43 | unelected |
| Labour | Councillor Victor Bertie Kirby | 43 | unelected |
| Labour | Councillor Fred Robinson | 43 | unelected |
| Independent | Councillor Peter Kavanagh | 2 | unelected |

=== Aldermanic Election 3 June 1936 (Charles Sydney Jones) ===
Caused by the death on 5 May 1936 of Alderman Burton William Eills JP (Liberal, last elected as an alderman on 9 November 1932, in whose place Councillor Charles Sydney Jones JP (Liberal, elected unopposed for the Fairfield ward in November 1933) was elected as an alderman by the councillors on 3 June 1936.

Aldermanic Election 3 June 1936
| Party | Candidate | Votes | % | Allocated ward |
|---|---|---|---|---|
| Liberal | Councillor Charles Sydney Jones JP | 53 | 58% | No. 36 Much Woolton |
| Labour | Councillor Lawrence King | 39 | 42% | Not elected |

The term of office to expire on 9 November 1938.

=== Aldermanic Election 3 June 1936 (Arthur Richard Price) ===
Caused by the death of Alderman Frederick Smith (Liberal, elected as an alderman on 9 November 1932), in whose place Councillor Arthur Richard Price (Liberal, elected unopposed for the Anfield ward on 1 November 1933), retired corn merchant of 77 Newsham Drive, Liverpool 6, was elected as an alderman by the councillors on 3 June 1936.

Aldermanic Election 3 June 1936
| Party | Candidate | Votes | % | Allocated ward |
|---|---|---|---|---|
| Liberal | Councillor Arthur Richard Price | 51 | 57% | No. |
| Labour | Councillor Lawrence King | 39 | 43% | Not elected |

The Term of Office to expire on 9 November 1936.

== By-elections ==
=== No. 9 Abercromby, 3 December 1935 ===
Caused by the disqualification of Councillor Arthur Lumb (Labour, elected 1 November 1934).

No. 9 Abercromby
| Party | Candidate | Votes | % | ±% |
|---|---|---|---|---|
| Labour | John Reginald Bevins | 1,991 | 53% | |
| Conservative | Alexander Maver Finlayson | 1,756 | 47% | |
| Majority | | 235 | | |
| Registered electors | | 9,574 | | |
| Turnout | | 3,747 | 39% | |
| Labour hold | | Swing | | |

The term of office to expire on 1 November 1937.

=== No.23 St. Domingo, 12 December 1935 ===
Caused by the election as an alderman on 9 November 1935 of Councillor Rev. Harry Dixon Longbottom (Protestant, last elected 1 November 1933).

No. 23 St. Domingo
| Party | Candidate | Votes | % | ±% |
|---|---|---|---|---|
| Protestant | George Henry Dunbar | 2,024 | 58% | |
| Labour | George Thompson Holliday | 1,482 | 42% | |
| Majority | | 542 | | |
| Registered electors | | 11,382 | | |
| Turnout | | 3,506 | 31% | |
| Protestant hold | | Swing | | |

The term of office to expire on 1 November 1936.

=== No. 36 Much Woolton, 19 December 1935 ===
Caused by the resignation of Councillor Ernest Whiteley (Independent, elected 1 November 1934).

No. 36 Much Woolton
| Party | Candidate | Votes | % | ±% |
|---|---|---|---|---|
| Conservative | Vivian Forsyth Crosthwaite | 804 | 54% | |
| Independent | Mrs. Caroline Whiteley | 611 | 41% | |
| | Cedric Ernest Hargreaves | 87 | 6% | |
| Majority | | 193 | | |
| Registered electors | | 2,747 | | |
| Turnout | | 1,502 | 55% | |
| Conservative gain from Independent | | Swing | | |

The term of office to end on 1 November 1937.

=== No. 30 Breckfield, 23 January 1936 ===
Caused by the election as an alderman on 9 November 1935 of Councillor Thomas Henry Burton (Conservative, elected 1 November 1933).

No. 30 Breckfield
| Party | Candidate | Votes | % | ±% |
|---|---|---|---|---|
| Conservative | David John Lewis | 1,398 | 67% | |
| Labour | Alfred Walker Boothman | 682 | 33% | |
| Majority | | 716 | | |
| Registered electors | | 10,292 | | |
| Turnout | | 2,080 | 20% | |
| Conservative hold | | Swing | | |

The term of office to end on 1 November 1936.

=== No. 17 Aigburth, 3 March 1936 ===
Caused by the resignation of Councillor Eric Errington MP (Conservative, elected 1 November 1934).

No. 17 Aigburth
| Party | Candidate | Votes | % | ±% |
|---|---|---|---|---|
| Liberal | Arthur Donald Dennis | 2,415 | 66% | |
| Conservative | Harold Diedrick Arrowsmith | 1,267 | 34% | |
| Majority | | 1,148 | | |
| Registered electors | | 10,095 | | |
| Turnout | | 3,682 | 36% | |
| Liberal gain from Conservative | | Swing | | |

The term of office to end on 1 November 1937.

=== No. 17 Aigburth, 10 September 1936 ===
Caused by the resignation of Councillor Arthur Donald Dennis (Liberal, elected at the by-election of 3 March 1936).

No. 17 Aigburth
| Party | Candidate | Votes | % | ±% |
|---|---|---|---|---|
| Liberal | John Richard Jones | unopposed | | |
| Registered electors | | 10,095 | | |
| Liberal hold | | Swing | | |

The term of office to end on 1 November 1937.

=== No.31 Fairfield, ===
Following the death on 5 May 1936 of Alderman Burton William Eills JP (Liberal, last elected as an alderman on 9 November 1932, in whose place Councillor Charles Sydney Jones JP (Liberal, elected unopposed for the Fairfield ward in November 1933) was elected as an alderman by the councillors on 3 June 1936.

No. 31 Fairfield
| Party | Candidate | Votes | % | ±% |
|---|---|---|---|---|
| Liberal | Charles Sydney Jones | | | |
| Majority | | | | |
| Registered electors | | 10,430 | | |
| Turnout | | | | |
| | | Swing | | |

=== No.29 Anfield, ===
Following the death of Alderman Frederick Smith (Liberal, elected as an alderman on 9 November 1932), in whose place Councillor Arthur Richard Price (Liberal, elected unopposed for the Anfield ward on 1 November 1933) was elected as an alderman by the councillors on 3 June 1936.

No. 29 Anfield
| Party | Candidate | Votes | % | ±% |
|---|---|---|---|---|
| Liberal | Arthur Richard Price | | | |
| Majority | | | | |
| Registered electors | | | | |
| Turnout | | | | |
| | | Swing | | |

== See also ==
- Liverpool City Council
- Liverpool Town Council elections 1835 – 1879
- Liverpool City Council elections 1880–present
- Mayors and Lord Mayors of Liverpool 1207 to present
- History of local government in England
