= 1930 Liverpool City Council election =

1930 English local government election

| ← 1929 | 1 November 1930 | 1931 → |

39 councillors' seats were up for election

Elections to Liverpool City Council were held on 1 November 1930.

Five of the seats were uncontested.

After the election, the composition of the council was:

| Party | Councillors | ± | Aldermen | Total |
|---|---|---|---|---|
| Conservative | ?? | +5 | ?? | ?? |
| Labour | ?? | -5 | ?? | ?? |
| Liberal | ?? | 0 | ?? | ?? |
| Independent | ?? | +1 | ?? | ?? |
| Centre Party | ?? | -2 | ?? | ?? |
| Democratic Labour | ?? | +1 | ?? | ?? |
| Protestant | ?? | +1 | ?? | ?? |

== Election result ==
Liverpool local election result 1930
| Party | Seats | Gains | Losses | Net gain/loss | Seats % | Votes % | Votes | +/− |
|---|---|---|---|---|---|---|---|---|
| Conservative | 24 | 5 | 0 | +5 | 62% | | | |
| Labour | 7 | 1 | 6 | -5 | 18% | | | |
| Liberal | 4 | 0 | 0 | 0 | 10% | | | |
| Independent | 1 | 1 | 0 | +1 | 3% | | | |
| Democratic Labour | 1 | 1 | 0 | +1 | 3% | | | |
| Centre Party | 1 | 0 | 2 | -2 | 3% | | | |
| Protestant | 1 | 1 | 0 | +1 | 3% | | | |
| Communist | 0 | 0 | 0 | 0 | 0% | | | |

== Ward results ==
* - Councillor seeking re-election

Comparisons are made with the 1927 election results.

=== Abercromby ===
No. 9 Abercromby
| Party | Candidate | Votes | % | ±% |
|---|---|---|---|---|
| Conservative | William Thomas Roberts * | 2,209 | 75% | |
| Labour | Patrick Campbell | 733 | 25% | |
| Majority | | 1,476 | | |
| Registered electors | | 9,000 | | |
| Turnout | | 2,942 | 33% | |
| Conservative hold | | Swing | | |

=== Aigburth ===
No. 17 Aigburth
| Party | Candidate | Votes | % | ±% |
|---|---|---|---|---|
| Conservative | Edward James Deane * | 2,743 | 82% | |
| Labour | William Edward Lloyd | 582 | 18% | |
| Majority | | 2,161 | | |
| Registered electors | | 8,137 | | |
| Turnout | | 3,325 | 41% | |
| Conservative hold | | Swing | | |

=== Allerton ===
No. 35 Allerton
| Party | Candidate | Votes | % | ±% |
|---|---|---|---|---|
| Conservative | George Alfred Strong * | 1,351 | 66% | |
| Labour | Mrs. Alice Elliott | 380 | 19% | |
| Liberal | Henry Banks | 315 | 15% | |
| Majority | | 971 | | |
| Registered electors | | 4,115 | | |
| Turnout | | 2,046 | 50% | |
| Conservative hold | | Swing | | |

=== Anfield ===
No. 29 Anfield
| Party | Candidate | Votes | % | ±% |
|---|---|---|---|---|
| Liberal | Arthur Richard Price * | 2,364 | 78% | |
| Labour | Austin Rainford | 682 | 22% | |
| Majority | | 1,682 | | |
| Registered electors | | 10,924 | | |
| Turnout | | 3,046 | 28% | |
| Liberal hold | | Swing | | |

=== Breckfield ===
No. 30 Breckfield
| Party | Candidate | Votes | % | ±% |
|---|---|---|---|---|
| Conservative | Thomas Henry Burton * | 2,338 | 51% | |
| Labour | William James Riddick | 1,334 | 29% | |
| Protestant | George Edward Lewis | 921 | 20% | |
| Majority | | 1,004 | | |
| Registered electors | | 10,398 | | |
| Turnout | | 4,593 | 44% | |
| Conservative hold | | Swing | | |

=== Brunswick ===
No. 11 Brunswick
| Party | Candidate | Votes | % | ±% |
|---|---|---|---|---|
| Labour | Thomas Hanley * | 2,382 | 72% | |
| Conservative | David Jukes | 911 | 28% | |
| Majority | | 1,471 | | |
| Registered electors | | 9,073 | | |
| Turnout | | 3,293 | 36% | |
| Labour hold | | Swing | | |

=== Castle Street ===
No. 7 Castle Street
| Party | Candidate | Votes | % | ±% |
|---|---|---|---|---|
| Conservative | William Denton * | unopposed | | |
| Registered electors | | | | |
| Conservative hold | | Swing | | |

=== Childwall ===
No. 38 Childwall
| Party | Candidate | Votes | % | ±% |
|---|---|---|---|---|
| Liberal | Alan Anderson Boyle * | 938 | 53% | |
| Conservative | Harry Beckett | 679 | 38% | |
| Labour | Thomas Crossland | 151 | 9% | |
| Majority | | 259 | | |
| Registered electors | | 3,076 | | |
| Turnout | | 1,768 | 57% | |
| Liberal hold | | Swing | | |

=== Croxteth ===
This was a new ward from 1928, so no councillor was elected in 1927.

No. 40 Croxteth
| Party | Candidate | Votes | % | ±% |
|---|---|---|---|---|
| Conservative | Oswald Wade | 1,853 | 55% | |
| Labour | Alfred Hargreaves | 1,520 | 45% | |
| Majority | | 333 | | |
| Registered electors | | 9,541 | | |
| Turnout | | 3,373 | 35% | |
| Conservative win (new seat) | | | | |

=== Dingle ===
No. 12 Dingle
| Party | Candidate | Votes | % | ±% |
|---|---|---|---|---|
| Conservative | Harry Bosworth | 4,088 | 51% | |
| Labour | Alfred Demain | 3,061 | 39% | |
| Protestant | Albert Henry Osborne | 789 | 10% | |
| Majority | | 1,027 | | |
| Registered electors | | 15,515 | | |
| Turnout | | 7,983 | 51% | |
| Conservative gain from Labour | | Swing | | |

=== Edge Hill ===
No. 18 Edge Hill
| Party | Candidate | Votes | % | ±% |
|---|---|---|---|---|
| Conservative | Herbert Henry Nuttall | 2,508 | 52% | |
| Ind. Socialist | Robert Tissyman * | 1,241 | 26% | |
| Labour | Henry Osmond Pugh | 1,050 | 22% | |
| British Union of Fascists | Dewi Protherow | 36 | 1% | |
| Majority | | 1,267 | | |
| Registered electors | | 13,336 | | |
| Turnout | | 4,835 | 36% | |
| Conservative gain from Labour | | Swing | | |

=== Everton ===
No. 21 Everton
| Party | Candidate | Votes | % | ±% |
|---|---|---|---|---|
| Labour | Bertie Victor Kirby * | 2,680 | 47% | |
| Democratic Labour | Thomas Conifer | 1,008 | 18% | |
| Protestant | Thomas Dunne | 645 | 11% | |
| Majority | | 1,269 | 29% | |
| Registered electors | | 15,549 | | |
| Turnout | | 5,744 | 37% | |
| Labour hold | | Swing | | |

=== Exchange ===
No. 5 Exchange
| Party | Candidate | Votes | % | ±% |
|---|---|---|---|---|
| Independent | James Farrell | unopposed | | |
| Registered electors | | | | |
| Independent gain from Catholic | | Swing | | |

=== Fairfield ===
No. 31 Fairfield
| Party | Candidate | Votes | % | ±% |
|---|---|---|---|---|
| Liberal | Charles Sydney Jones * | 2,361 | 72% | |
| Labour | William Henry Baxter | 931 | 28% | |
| Majority | | 1,430 | 44% | |
| Registered electors | | 10,272 | | |
| Turnout | | 3,292 | 32% | |
| Liberal hold | | Swing | | |

=== Fazakerley ===
No. 27 Fazakerley
| Party | Candidate | Votes | % | ±% |
|---|---|---|---|---|
| Conservative | William Greenough Gregson | 2,347 | 58% | |
| Labour | Bernard Louis Meyer | 1,727 | 42% | |
| Majority | | 620 | | |
| Registered electors | | 10,374 | | |
| Turnout | | 4,074 | 39% | |
| Conservative hold | | Swing | | |

=== Garston ===
No. 37 Garston
| Party | Candidate | Votes | % | ±% |
|---|---|---|---|---|
| Labour | Joseph Jackson Cleary * | 2,218 | 53% | |
| Conservative | Roger Abel | 1,953 | 47% | |
| Majority | | 265 | | |
| Registered electors | | 7,042 | | |
| Turnout | | 4,171 | 59% | |
| Labour hold | | Swing | | |

=== Granby ===
No. 14 Granby
| Party | Candidate | Votes | % | ±% |
|---|---|---|---|---|
| Conservative | William Adam Edwards | 1,983 | 58% | |
| Labour | James Johnstone * | 1,414 | 42% | |
| Majority | | 569 | | |
| Registered electors | | 9,908 | | |
| Turnout | | 3,397 | 34% | |
| Conservative gain from Labour | | Swing | | |

=== Great George ===
No. 10 Great George
| Party | Candidate | Votes | % | ±% |
|---|---|---|---|---|
| Democratic Labour | John Loughlin * | 814 | 68% | |
| Labour | Richard Thomas Hughes | 389 | 32% | |
| Majority | | 425 | | |
| Registered electors | | 5,042 | | |
| Turnout | | 1,203 | 24% | |
| Democratic Labour gain from Labour | | | | |

=== Kensington ===
No. 19 Kensington
| Party | Candidate | Votes | % | ±% |
|---|---|---|---|---|
| Conservative | Thomas Norman Jones | 2,935 | 64% | |
| Labour | George Porter | 1,625 | 36% | |
| Majority | | 1,309 | | |
| Registered electors | | 11,398 | | |
| Turnout | | 4,561 | 40% | |
| Conservative hold | | Swing | | |

=== Kirkdale ===
No. 24 Kirkdale
| Party | Candidate | Votes | % | ±% |
|---|---|---|---|---|
| Conservative | Charles Porter | 3,283 | 37% | |
| Labour | Frederick Jones * | 3,160 | 36% | |
| Protestant | Mrs. Mary Jane Longbottom | 2,316 | 26% | |
| Majority | | 123 | | |
| Registered electors | | 17,015 | | |
| Turnout | | 8,759 | 51% | |
| Conservative gain from Labour | | Swing | | |

=== Low Hill ===
No. 20 Low Hill
| Party | Candidate | Votes | % | ±% |
|---|---|---|---|---|
| Conservative | Charles Edward Pugh | 2,049 | 54% | |
| Labour | Joseph Whitehead | 1,744 | 46% | |
| Majority | | 305 | | |
| Registered electors | | 11,186 | | |
| Turnout | | 3,793 | 34% | |
| Conservative gain from Labour | | Swing | | |

=== Much Woolton ===
No. 36 Much Woolton
| Party | Candidate | Votes | % | ±% |
|---|---|---|---|---|
| Conservative | William Edward Stirling Napier * | 753 | 74% | |
| Labour | William Robert Snell | 258 | 26% | |
| Majority | | 495 | | |
| Registered electors | | 2,136 | | |
| Turnout | | 1,011 | 47% | |
| Conservative hold | | Swing | | |

=== Netherfield ===
No. 22 Netherfield
| Party | Candidate | Votes | % | ±% |
|---|---|---|---|---|
| Conservative | Alfred Michael Urding * | 3,770 | 53% | |
| Labour | Alexander Key | 1,721 | 24% | |
| Protestant | Albert Clayton | 1,318 | 19% | |
| Independent | William Edward McLaclan | 276 | 4% | |
| Majority | | 2,049 | | |
| Registered electors | | 12,178 | | |
| Turnout | | 7,085 | 58% | |
| Conservative hold | | Swing | | |

=== North Scotland ===
No. 2 North Scotland
| Party | Candidate | Votes | % | ±% |
|---|---|---|---|---|
| Labour | Frederick William Tucker | 1,985 | 82% | |
| Communist | Leo Joseph McGree | 428 | 18% | |
| Majority | | 1,557 | | |
| Registered electors | | 8,605 | | |
| Turnout | | 2,413 | 28% | |
| Labour hold | | Swing | | |

=== Old Swan ===
No. 32 Old Swan
| Party | Candidate | Votes | % | ±% |
|---|---|---|---|---|
| Conservative | Moss Greenberg | 3,571 | 62% | |
| Labour | William Sydney Dytor | 2,219 | 38% | |
| Majority | | 1,352 | | |
| Registered electors | | 15,247 | | |
| Turnout | | 5,790 | 38% | |
| Conservative hold | | Swing | | |

=== Prince's Park ===
No. 13 Prince's Park
| Party | Candidate | Votes | % | ±% |
|---|---|---|---|---|
| Conservative | Miss Margaret Beavan | 3,077 | 70% | |
| Labour | Robert Edward Costier | 1,298 | 30% | |
| Majority | | 1,779 | | |
| Registered electors | | 9,867 | | |
| Turnout | | 4,375 | 44% | |
| Conservative hold | | Swing | | |

=== Sandhills ===
No. 1 Sandhills
| Party | Candidate | Votes | % | ±% |
|---|---|---|---|---|
| Labour | John Wolfe Tone Morrissey * | unopposed | | |
| Registered electors | | | | |
| Labour hold | | Swing | | |

=== St. Anne's ===
No. 6 St. Anne's
| Party | Candidate | Votes | % | ±% |
|---|---|---|---|---|
| Labour | Mrs. Elizabeth Margaret Braddock | 1,392 | 60% | |
| Democratic Labour | Mrs.Louise Frances Hughes | 935 | 40% | |
| Majority | | 457 | | |
| Registered electors | | 9,436 | | |
| Turnout | | 2,327 | 25% | |
| Labour hold | | Swing | | |

=== St. Domingo ===
No. 23 St. Domingo
| Party | Candidate | Votes | % | ±% |
|---|---|---|---|---|
| Protestant | Rev. Harry Dixon Longbottom | 2,862 | 47% | |
| Conservative | William Trevor Thomas | 1,682 | 28% | |
| Labour | John Hamilton * | 1,570 | 26% | |
| Majority | | 1,180 | 19% | N/A |
| Registered electors | | 11,737 | | |
| Turnout | | 6,114 | 52% | |
| Protestant gain from Labour | | Swing | | |

=== St. Peter's ===
No. 8 St. Peter's
| Party | Candidate | Votes | % | ±% |
|---|---|---|---|---|
| Liberal | Miss Mary Mabel Ellis | 850 | 74% | |
| Labour | Miss Elsie Emily Louise Hickling | 304 | 26% | |
| Majority | | 546 | | |
| Registered electors | | 3,054 | | |
| Turnout | | 1,154 | 38% | |
| Liberal hold | | Swing | | |

=== Sefton Park East ===
No. 15 Sefton Park East
| Party | Candidate | Votes | % | ±% |
|---|---|---|---|---|
| Conservative | George Edward Holme * | unopposed | | |
| Registered electors | | | | |
| Conservative hold | | Swing | | |

=== Sefton Park West ===
No. 16 Sefton Park West
| Party | Candidate | Votes | % | ±% |
|---|---|---|---|---|
| Conservative | Walter Thomas Lancashire | 2,160 | 83% | |
| Labour | Mrs. Julia Gertrude Taylor | 446 | 17% | |
| Majority | | 1,714 | | |
| Registered electors | | 6,230 | | |
| Turnout | | 2,606 | 42% | |
| Conservative hold | | Swing | | |

=== South Scotland ===
No. 3 South Scotland
| Party | Candidate | Votes | % | ±% |
|---|---|---|---|---|
| Labour | Michael John Reppion * | 2,310 | 82% | |
| Independent | Patrick James Loughran | 524 | 18% | |
| Majority | | 1,786 | | |
| Registered electors | | 8,830 | | |
| Turnout | | 2,834 | 32% | |
| Labour gain from Catholic | | Swing | | |

=== Vauxhall ===
No. 4 Vauxhall
| Party | Candidate | Votes | % | ±% |
|---|---|---|---|---|
| Independent | Joseph Belger * | unopposed | | |
| Registered electors | | | | |
| Independent gain from Catholic | | Swing | | |

=== Walton ===
No. 25 Walton
| Party | Candidate | Votes | % | ±% |
|---|---|---|---|---|
| Conservative | Robert John Hall * | 3,776 | 65% | |
| Labour | John Reginald Bevins | 2,026 | 35% | |
| Majority | | 1,750 | 30% | |
| Registered electors | | 16,119 | | |
| Turnout | | 5,802 | 36% | |
| Conservative hold | | Swing | | |

=== Warbreck ===
No. 26 Warbreck
| Party | Candidate | Votes | % | ±% |
|---|---|---|---|---|
| Conservative | John Hill * | 3,299 | 70% | |
| Co-operative Party | Joseph Farrar Kitchen | 1,392 | 30% | |
| Majority | | 1,907 | | |
| Registered electors | | 12,415 | | |
| Turnout | | 4,691 | 38% | |
| Conservative hold | | Swing | | |

=== Wavertree ===
No. 34 Wavertree
| Party | Candidate | Votes | % | ±% |
|---|---|---|---|---|
| Conservative | John Morris Griffith * | 3,525 | 69% | |
| Labour | John Gibbon Elliott | 1,582 | 31% | |
| Majority | | 1,943 | | |
| Registered electors | | 14,333 | | |
| Turnout | | 5,107 | 36% | |
| Conservative hold | | Swing | | |

=== Wavertree West ===
No. 33 Wavertree West
| Party | Candidate | Votes | % | ±% |
|---|---|---|---|---|
| Conservative | Alfred Levy | 2,243 | 47% | |
| Labour | Ernest Whiteley * | 1,970 | 41% | |
| Liberal | William Herbert Shepherd | 560 | 12% | |
| Majority | | 273 | | |
| Registered electors | | 8,973 | | |
| Turnout | | 4,773 | 53% | |
| Conservative gain from Labour | | Swing | | |

=== West Derby ===
No. 28 West Derby
| Party | Candidate | Votes | % | ±% |
|---|---|---|---|---|
| Conservative | Ernest Ash Cookson | 4,339 | 71% | |
| Labour | William Dean Jones | 1,747 | 29% | |
| Majority | | 2,592 | | |
| Registered electors | | 18,299 | | |
| Turnout | | 6,086 | 33% | |
| Conservative hold | | Swing | | |

== Aldermanic elections ==
=== Aldermanic election 10 November 1930 ===
The term of office of Alderman Henry Morley Miller (Conservative, elected as an alderman on 10 November 1924) expired on 10 November 1930 and he was re-elected for a further 5-year term by the Councillors on that date.

Aldermanic Election 10 November 1930
| Party | Alderman | Votes | % | Allocated ward |
|---|---|---|---|---|
| Conservative | Henry Morley Miller * | 68 | 100% | No. 35 Allerton |

=== Aldermanic Election 7 January 1931 ===
Following the death of Alderman Thomas Wafer Byrne (Labour, elected as an alderman on 9 November 1929), Councillor Herbert Edward Rose (Labour, Breckfield, elected on 1 November 1929) was elected by the councillors as an alderman on 7 January 1931.

Aldermanic Election 7 January 1931
| Party | Alderman | Votes | % | Allocated ward |
|---|---|---|---|---|
| Labour | Herbert Edward Rose | 30 | 100% | No. 24 Kirkdale |

=== Aldermanic Election 1 April 1931 ===
Following the death on 17 December 1930 of Alderman John Gordon J.P. (Conservative, last elected as an alderman on 9 November 1929), Councillor Frank Campbell Wilson J.P. (Conservative, Aigburth, elected 1 November 1929) was elected as an alderman by the councillors on 1 April 1931

Aldermanic Election 1 April 1931
| Party | Candidate | Votes | % | Allocated ward |
|---|---|---|---|---|
| Conservative | Frank Campbell Wilson | 56 | 98% | No. 12 Dingle |
| Labour | Robert Tissyman | 1 | 2% | |

=== Aldermanic Election 6 May 1931 ===
Following the death on 24 December 1930 of Alderman John George Moyles M.B.E. J.P. (Conservative, last elected as an alderman on 9 November 1929), Councillor Herbert John Davis (Conservative, Allerton, elected 1 November 1929) was elected as an alderman by the councillors on 6 May 1931.

Aldermanic Election 6 May 1931
| Party | Candidate | Votes | % | Allocated ward |
|---|---|---|---|---|
| Conservative | Herbert John Davis | 49 | 100% | No. 34 Wavertree |

=== Aldermanic Election 7 October 1931 ===
Following the resignation of Alderman Richard Rutherford (Conservative, last elected as an alderman on 9 November 1929), which was reported to the Council on 2 September 1931, Councillor Sir Thomas White (Conservative Party, St. Domingo, elected 1 November 1928) was elected as an alderman by the councillors on 7 October 1931.

Aldermanic Election 7 October 1931
| Party | Candidate | Votes | % | Allocated ward |
|---|---|---|---|---|
| Conservative | Sir Thomas White | 61 | 98% | |
| Labour | Robert Tissyman | 1 | 2% | |

== By-elections ==
=== No. 30 Breckfield, 24 March 1931 ===
Following the death of Alderman Thomas Wafer Byrne, Councillor Herbert Edward Rose (Labour, Breckfield, elected on 1 November 1929) was elected by the councillors as an alderman on 7 January 1931, causing a vacancy in the Breckfield ward.

No. 30 Breckfield
| Party | Candidate | Votes | % | ±% |
|---|---|---|---|---|
| Conservative | Ada Martha Burton | 1,506 | 51% | |
| Labour | William James Riddick | 859 | 29% | |
| Protestant | George Edward Lewis | 604 | 20% | |
| Majority | | 647 | | |
| Registered electors | | 10,398 | | |
| Turnout | | 2,969 | 29% | |
| Conservative hold | | Swing | | |

=== No. 17 Aigburth, 20 May 1931 ===
Following the death on 17 December 1930 of Alderman John Gordon J.P. (Conservative, last elected as an alderman on 9 November 1929), Councillor Frank Campbell Wilson J.P. (Conservative, Aigburth, elected 1 November 1929) was elected as an alderman by the councillors on 1 April 1931, causing a vacancy in the Aigburth ward.

No. 17 Aigburth
| Party | Candidate | Votes | % | ±% |
|---|---|---|---|---|
| Conservative | Vere Egerton Cotton | unopposed | | |
| Registered electors | | 8,137 | | |
| Conservative hold | | Swing | | |

=== No. 35 Allerton, 6 October 1931 ===
Following the death on 24 December 1930 of Alderman John George Moyles M.B.E. J.P. (Conservative, last elected as an alderman on 9 November 1929), Councillor Herbert John Davis (Conservative, Allerton, elected 1 November 1929) was elected as an alderman by the councillors on 6 May 1931, causing a vacancy in the Allerton ward.

No. 35 Allerton
| Party | Candidate | Votes | % | ±% |
|---|---|---|---|---|
| Conservative | William George Heath | unopposed | | |
| Registered electors | | 4,115 | | |
| Conservative hold | | Swing | | |

=== No. 13 Prince's Park, Thursday 23 July 1931 ===
Caused by the death on 22 February 1931 of Councillor Miss Margaret Beavan (Conservative, Prince's Park, last elected 1 November 1930).

No. 13 Prince's Park
| Party | Candidate | Votes | % | ±% |
|---|---|---|---|---|
| Conservative | William Trevor Thomas | 2,096 | 69% | |
| Labour | John Hamilton | 1,168 | 31% | |
| Majority | | 1,168 | | |
| Registered electors | | 9,867 | | |
| Turnout | | 3,024 | 31% | |
| Conservative hold | | Swing | | |

=== No. 23 St. Domingo ===
Following the resignation of Alderman Richard Rutherford (Conservative, last elected as an alderman on 9 November 1929), which was reported to the Council on 2 September 1931, Councillor Sir Thomas White (Conservative Party, St. Domingo, elected 1 November 1928) was elected as an alderman by the councillors on 7 October 1931, thereby causing a vacancy in the St. Domingo ward.

=== No. 4 Vauxhall ===
Caused by the resignation of Councillor Dr. Percy Henry Hayes (Labour, Vauxhall, last elected on 1 November 1929), which was reported to the Council on 21 October 1931.

== See also ==
- Liverpool City Council
- Liverpool Town Council elections 1835 - 1879
- Liverpool City Council elections 1880–present
- Mayors and Lord Mayors of Liverpool 1207 to present
- History of local government in England
