= George William Arthur Trimmer =

British civil engineer (1939–1972)

Sir George William Arthur Trimmer M.I.C.E., M.I.M.E., M.Inst.T.
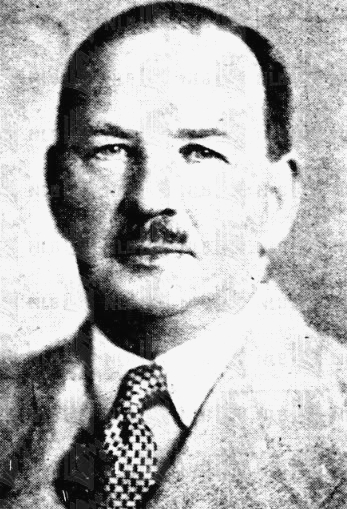
- Trimmer in 1939
- Born: 12 February 1882
- Died: 16 October 1972 (aged 90)
- Education: Harrogate College
- Occupation: Civil engineer

Sir George William Arthur Trimmer (12 February 1882 – 16 October 1972) was a British civil engineer who served as Chief Engineer and Chairman of the Penang and Singapore Harbour Boards, Straits Settlements from 1923 to 1939.

== Early life and education ==
Trimmer was born on 12 February 1882, the eldest son of Rev. G. J. Trimmer, Ceylon, and Caroline Elizabeth née Bestall. He was educated at Harrogate College, Yorkshire and Kingswood School, Bath.

== Career ==
Trimmer received his training at Pulsometer Engineering Co., Reading, and started his engineering career on the staff of the Bakerloo underground railway in London. After serving in various parts of England, he went to India in 1904 where he was engineer in charge of irrigation construction at Diamond Harbour, Bengal, and later irrigation construction engineer at Mon Canals, Maymo district, Burma.

In 1911, Trimmer joined Topham Jones and Railton Ltd in Singapore, and worked on the construction of the Empire Dock and the reconstruction of the wharves of the Singapore Harbour Board. In 1918, he was involved in the construction of the Prai wharves at Penang. Later that year, he left the firm to take up the role of assistant to the general manager and local chairman of Singapore Harbour Board.

In 1923, he was appointed Chairman, General Manager and Chief Engineer Singapore and Penang Harbour Boards, Straits Settlements, by the Governor of the Straits Settlements, serving until 1939. It was largely due to his skill and expertise in engineering, finance and business organisation that the ports of Singapore and Penang grew in importance during the inter-war years, and were able to cope with the rapid growth of shipping. His ability to carry out large engineering projects was demonstrated as engineer-in-chief of the £900,000 wharf extension project.

When he resigned in 1939, the traffic at the port of Singapore had increased to 3,300 ships and two million tons of cargo each year, and by 1941, had the largest commercial dock in the British Empire east of Suez. On his retirement, the governor of the Straits Settlements, Sir Shenton Thomas paid tribute to his work describing him as: "the man, who more than any other, has made the port of Singapore what it is today".

After returning to England, Trimmer served as Director and Controller of Building Construction at the Ministry of Supply from 1940 to 1947, and was involved in laying out armaments factory sites throughout Britain. From 1947, he continued in service in various capacities at the Ministry before retiring in 1956.

== Personal life and death ==
Trimmer married Phyllis Primrose, widow of Colonel B. H. Beaumont-Checkland in 1939.

Trimmer died on 16 October 1972, aged 90.

== Honours ==
Trimmer was created a Knight Bachelor in the 1937 Coronation Honours.
