= Valentine Vivian =

British Indian army officer (1886–1969)

Valentine Patrick Terrel Vivian
- Colonel Valentine Vivian
- Born: 17 March 1886; Kensington, England
- Died: 15 April 1969 (aged 83); Lymington, England
- Military career
- Allegiance: United Kingdom
- Branch: British Army
- Rank: Colonel
- Nickname: Vee-Vee (as head of Section V)
- Conflicts: World War I (Palestine, Turkey); World War II (Ireland, Europe)
- Awards: Companion of the Most Distinguished Order of St Michael and St George (1947); Legion of Merit (Officer) (USA) (1947); Commander of the Order of the British Empire (1923); Officer of the Order of the British Empire (1918)
- Other work: Asst Superintendent of Police (Punjab) 1906; Superintendent of Police (Punjab) 1907; Asst Director Central Intelligence (India) 1914

Colonel Valentine Patrick Terrell Vivian CMG CBE (17 March 1886 – 15 April 1969) was the vice-chief of the SIS or MI6 and the first head of its counterespionage unit, Section V. Vivian, while he was attempting to introduce new blood into the service, selected Kim Philby, who later became notorious as "The Third Man" double agent and defected to the Russians, causing considerable harm to the system he had infiltrated.

== Family background ==
Valentine Vivian was born on 17 March 1886 in Kensington, London. He was the youngest of nine children of Tom Comely Vivian, portrait painter, and Elizabeth Baly Farquhar, miniature painter. His brother Sir Sylvanus Percival Vivian (1880–1958) was former Registrar General of England from 1921 to 1945.

In 1911, Vivian married Mary Primrose Warlow, daughter of the Venerable Edmund John Warlow, archdeacon of Lahore, India.

== Early career ==
Vivian joined the Indian Police (Imperial Service) in December 1906 and was posted as assistant district superintendent of police for Punjab, reaching the rank of assistant superintendent in November 1907, and subsequently superintendent of police for Ambala, Ludhiana, Jhang, Hissar, Sialkot, and Lahore railway police. He was senior superintendent of police for the Delhi province and in October 1914 became an assistant director of central intelligence (Simla). During the First World War, Vivian served in the Indian Army in Turkey and Palestine. At one point early in his career, he served in the Department of Criminal Intelligence (Simla) in India. He retired from the Indian Police in 1925.

In the mid-1920s, agency director Sir Hugh Sinclair, the second "C", wanted to absorb MI5, the UK's counter-intelligence agency, into the SIS; when his attempt was finally rejected, in 1925, he formed the CE section, later (1939) renamed "Section V".

Between 1925 and 1931, organisational rivalries proliferated among Vivian's CE section, the domestic intelligence agency, MI5, and Scotland Yard. A network of domestic agents known as the 'Casuals' had provided information to CE section. In 1930, after a series of meetings of the Special Services Committee, the Casuals were transferred to MI5, where they became "M Section"; many still provided the SIS with information.

Under Vivian, Section V focused on the activities of the Comintern, which Vivian initially "regarded... as a criminal conspiracy rather than a clandestine political movement". Vivian was the author of the 1932 report (FO 1093/92) on the Hilaire Noulens case, but his authorship was revealed only in 1994.

== Later career ==
In the summer of 1940, Vivian was one of the organisers of the British Resistance organisation created by SIS. He was particularly responsible for liaison with MI5 to ensure the legality of the body (SIS were not supposed to operate within the UK). In 1941, he became Vice-Chief of SIS but was engaged in a long-running power struggle with Claude Dansey for power within the organisation. He retired from SIS in 1951.
