= Harry Dixon Longbottom =

British politician

Rev. Harry Longbottom

Lord Mayor of Liverpool
- In office 1950–1951
- Preceded by: Sir Joseph Jackson Cleary
- Succeeded by: Colonel Vere Cotton C.B.E.

The Reverend Harry Dixon Longbottom (1886–1962) was a British Baptist minister and politician who served as Lord Mayor of Liverpool.

== Biography ==
Longbottom was born in Yorkshire in 1886. He was elected to Liverpool City Council on 1 December 1925 as Conservative Protestant for Breckfield Ward. In 1926 he lost his seat by only 46 votes but regained a council place for St. Domingo ward on 31 October 1930.

He stood as a Liverpool Protestant Party candidate unsuccessfully for Kirkdale in the 1931 general election. He tried again unsuccessfully in 1935. He was elected as an Alderman in 1935.

He served as Lord Mayor of Liverpool from 1950-51.

== See also ==
- 1925 Liverpool City Council election
- 1930 Liverpool City Council election
- 1935 Liverpool City Council election
- Liverpool City Council
- Mayors and Lord Mayors of Liverpool 1207 to present
