= Sylvanus Percival Vivian =

Sir Sylvanus Percival Vivian CB (October 1, 1880 in London – 1958) was the 7th Registrar General of England and Wales (1921–1945). He was the longest serving Registrar General after George Graham.

== Career ==
Vivian was responsible for organising the censuses in England and Wales in 1921 and 1931. He oversaw National Registration which was introduced in 1939 and ended up replacing the normally decennial census due in 1941. He retired in 1945.

Vivian was appointed a Companion of the Order of the Bath (CB) in the 1925 Birthday Honours, and received a knighthood in May 1937. Vivian also is the author of the first dictionary of literary terms written in English and other works on literature and literary history.

Vivian was brother to Valentine Vivian.
