= Christopher Ling =

English cricketer and soldier (1888–1953)

Personal information
- Full name: Christopher George Ling
- Born: 6 November 1880; Wetheral, Cumberland, England
- Died: 21 May 1953 (aged 72); Camberley, Surrey, England
- Batting: Unknown
- Bowling: Unknown

Domestic team information
- Years: Team
- 1905/06: Europeans

Career statistics
Competition	First-class
Matches	1
Runs scored	18
Batting average	18.00
100s/50s	–/–
Top score	14
Balls bowled	66
Wickets	0
Bowling average	–
5 wickets in innings	–
10 wickets in match	–
Best bowling	–
Catches/stumpings	–/–
- Source: ESPNcricinfo, 4 December 2022

Christopher George Ling CB OStJ MC DSO (6 November 1880 – 21 May 1953) was an English first-class cricketer and British Army officer.

The son of Christopher Ling senior, he was born in November 1880 at Wetheral, Cumberland. He was educated at Bradfield College, where he played for both the cricket and football elevens. Ling was commissioned as a second lieutenant into the 1st Volunteer Battalion, Princess Charlotte of Wales's (Royal Berkshire Regiment) in June 1900. Transferring to the 1st Middlesex Engineers, he attended the Royal Indian Engineering College and graduated from there in October 1902. He was sent to British India in 1905, where he was posted to the 3rd Sappers and Miners of the British Indian Army. In July 1905, he was promoted to lieutenant. While serving in India, he made a single appearance in first-class cricket for the Europeans cricket team against the Parsees at Poona in the 1905–06 Bombay Presidency Match. Batting twice in the match, he ended the Europeans first innings of 137 all out on 4 not out, while in their second innings he was dismissed for 14 runs by Jehangir Warden. With the ball, he bowled 11 wicketless overs. He was seconded to the Royal Military Academy (RMA) at Woolwich in January 1913, where he was placed in command of a company of gentlemen cadets, with promotion to captain following in October of the same year.

At the beginning of the First World War in the summer of 1914, he was placed in command of companies of gentlemen cadets at the RMA. Later serving on the Western Front with the Royal Engineers, Ling was decorated with the Military Cross in 1916 Birthday Honours. He was promoted to major in October 1917, with appointment to the General Staff in December of the same year. Ling was further decorated with the Distinguished Service Order in the 1918 New Year Honours.

Following the war, he was temporarily appointed in February 1921 as chief instructor in military engraving and geometrical drawing at the RMA. In December 1923, he was appointed to the rank of brevet lieutenant colonel, before being appointed to the War Office in March 1926, an appointment which he relinquished in January 1927. Ling was promoted to colonel in April 1928, before being appointed a temporary brigadier in February 1931 whilst director of military operations at British Indian Army headquarters. In October 1936, his employment in the army ceased and he was placed on the half-pay list.

Ling was made a Companion of the Order of the Bath in the 1937 Coronation Honours, and was later appointed by George VI as an Officer in the Order of Saint John in the 1947 New Year Honours. During his military career, Ling served as the honorary secretary of the Army Football Association. Ling retired to England, where he died at Camberley in May 1953.
