= Ernest Strohmenger =

Sir Ernest John Strohmenger (13 January 1873 – 17 June 1967) was a British civil servant.

Entering the Civil Service in 1893, he was successively Deputy Comptroller, National Health Insurance Commission in 1913, Deputy Accountant-General, Ministry of Shipping in 1917, Accountant General, Ministry of Health from 1919 to 1930, Deputy Secretary, Ministry of Health from 1930 to 1932, Under Secretary, Treasury from 1932 to 1934, Deputy Chairman, Unemployment Assistance Board, from 1934 to 1937. He retired in 1937.

After his retirement, he was a member of the Expert Committee on the Defence of India in 1938–39.

Strohmenger was appointed a Companion of the Order of the Bath (CB) in the 1919 Birthday Honours, a Knight Commander of the Order of the British Empire (KBE) in the 1927 Birthday Honours, and promoted to Knight Grand Cross of that Order (GBE) in the 1937 Coronation Honours. He was an Officer of the Legion of Honour and of the Order of the Crown of Italy.
