= Harrogate College =

Further education college in Harrogate, England

Coordinates: 53.978°N 1.523°W

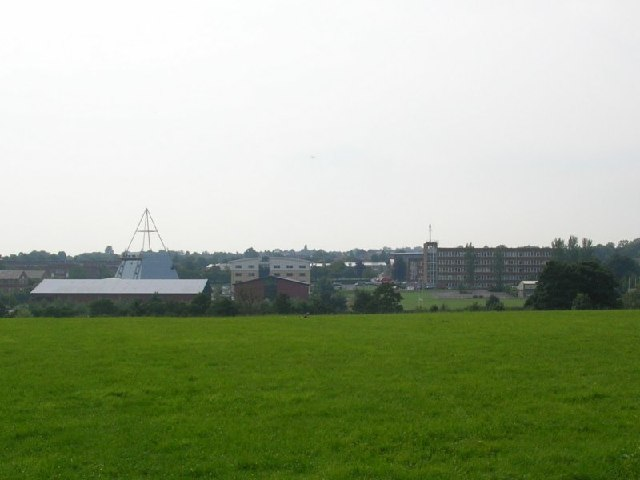
Buildings of the college

Harrogate College is a further education college in Harrogate, North Yorkshire, England. It traces its origins to the University Extension movement, which began in 1873 under the auspices of Cambridge University. It offers several levels of qualifications, including Further and Higher Education courses. Harrogate College relocated in 1985 to Hornbeam Park, after the older Bower Road location of the college in Harrogate closed.

The College was known as Harrogate College of Further Education and later Harrogate College of Arts and Technology prior to 1 September 1994, when the name was shortened to Harrogate College.

The college is on the former Harrogate ICI Fibres site in four buildings. Harrogate College merged with Leeds Metropolitan University in August 1998 and was classified as a university; the Harrogate College statutory corporation was dissolved on 1 August 1998. On 1 August 2008 management of the college was transferred to Hull College. This was not strictly a merger since Leeds Metropolitan University still had links with Harrogate College through the Regional University Network (RUN).

On 1 August 2019 it transferred from Hull College Group to the Leeds City College Group, which now operates as Luminate Education Group.

== Notable former students ==
- Andrew Brons, British National Party (BNP) MEP for Yorkshire and the Humber, former politics lecturer and student
- Leon Doyle, candidate on Series 7 of The Apprentice
- Richard Hammond, Top Gear presenter and television personality
- Charles Wilson (1857–1932), New Zealand member of parliament
