= Arthur Olver =

British army officer and expert on animal husbandry

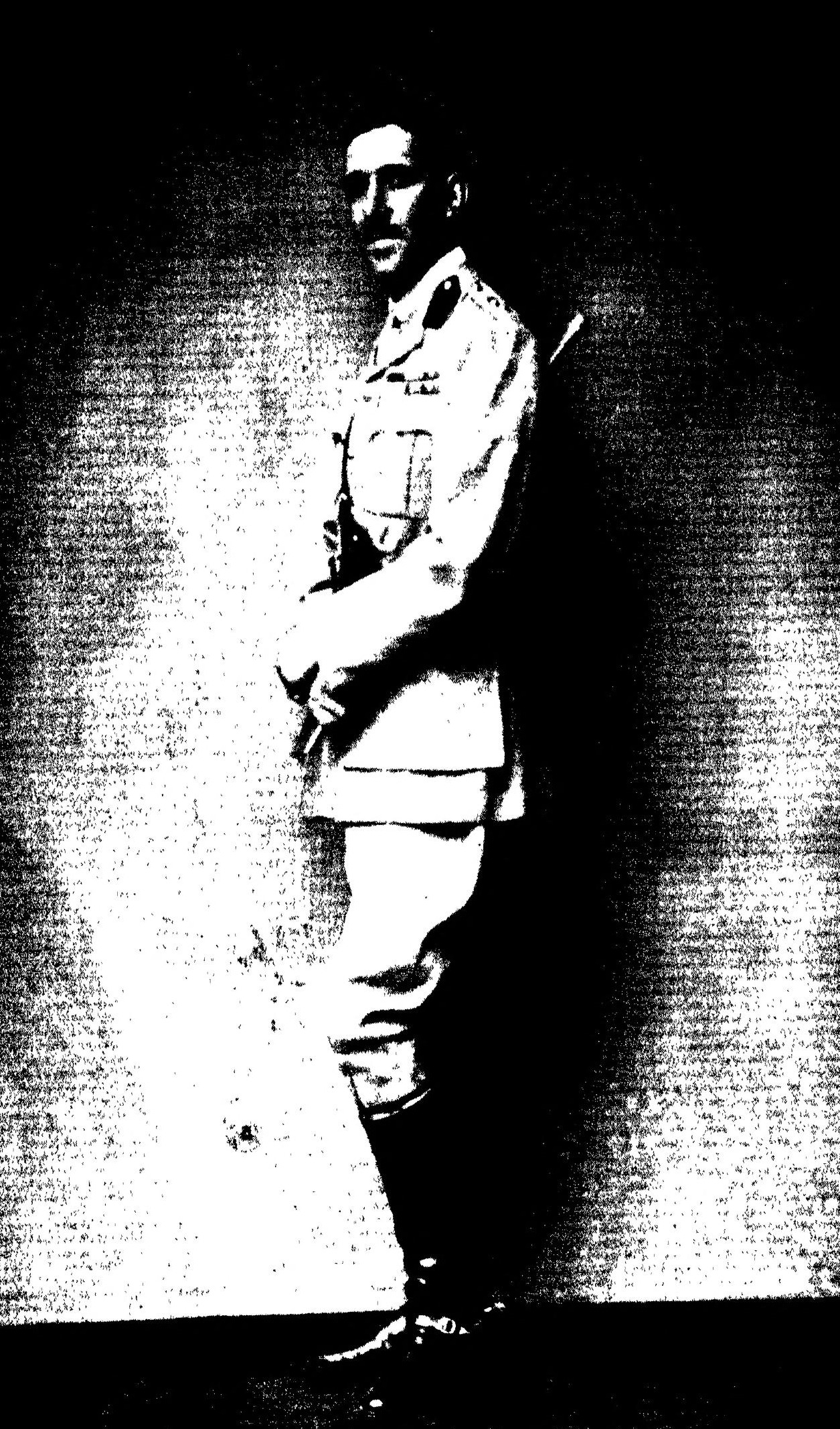
- At the time of retirement from India, 1938
- Born: 1875; Cornwall, England
- Died: 15 August 1961 (aged 85–86)
- Education: Royal Veterinary College
- Military career
- Allegiance: United Kingdom
- Branch: British Army
- Conflicts: Boer War; First World War

Sir Arthur Olver FRSE CB CMG (4 August 1875 – 15 August 1961) was a 20th-century British army officer and expert on animal husbandry. He served in Sudan and in India. He was one of the first to advocate livestock registration and monitoring of pedigree and animal movements to control the potential spread of disease and to ensure quality control.

== Life and work ==
Olver was born in 1875 the son of Robert Sobey Olver (1832-1913) of Trescowe House near Bodmin in Cornwall, and his wife, Mary Ann Jane Sobey. Robert was an agriculturalist. He was baptized in the church of St Mabyn. He went to school at Harleigh House School near Bodmin. Some sources note that he went to Godolphin School, although that appears unlikely as it was only meant for girls. He then studied at the Royal Veterinary College, London and was admitted MRCVS to the Royal College of Veterinary Surgeons in 1897. In 1899 he joined the Royal Army Veterinary Corps, seeing active service in the Second Boer War in South Africa. He served as a lieutenant with the cavalry in Natal and with the 3rd Dragoon Guards in Orange River Colony. He was awarded the Queen's South Africa Medal in 1902 with clasps for Cape Colony and Orange. In 1901 he was posted to Curragh. In 1906 he was posted to Egypt and then the Sudan in 1907. Here he dealt with trypanosomiasis, piroplasmosis, epizootic lymphangitis, rinderpest and African horse sickness. In 1908 he returned to England. In the First World War he was Mentioned in Dispatches three times and rose to the rank of Battalion Lt Colonel. From 1917 to 1919 he lived in Canada and the USA as part of the British Remount Commission of the War Mission to the US with an office in Montreal. From 1922 to 1927 he again served in Egypt. In 1928 he was promoted to colonel and was posted Assistant Director of Veterinary Services, Southern Command in India and later the year deputy director in the northern command. He retired from the army in April 1930 and applied for the position of Animal Husbandry Commissioner in the Imperial Council of Agricultural Research in India and took up the position in 1933. He was involved in establishing the journal Indian Journal of Veterinary Science and Animal Husbandry. His office was at Mukteshwar in the Himalayas. He was involved in establishing veterinary education in India with courses at the Patna Veterinary College (3 year course), the Punjab Veterinary College (4 year course) and in 1936 the Madras Veterinary College. The first All India Cattle Show was held in Delhi in 1938. He presided over a section on veterinary research at the 25th annual meeting of the Indian Science Congress Association which, to mark the silver jubilee of the Association at Calcutta from 3 to 9 January 1938. He retired from service in India in 1938 and became Principal of the Royal (Dick) Veterinary College in Edinburgh serving until 1946.

In 1939 he was elected a Fellow of the Royal Society of Edinburgh. His proposers were Sir Thomas Henry Holland, Sir Thomas Hudson Beare, James Ritchie and Francis Albert Eley Crew.

He died from a myocardial infarction in a London hospital on 15 August 1961. The parasite genus Olveria is named after him.

== Family ==
In 1914 he married Natal-born Marjorie Beart.

== Publications ==
- A Brief Survey of Some of the Important Breeds of Cattle in India (1938)
