= Maxwell Brander =

British Army general (1884–1972)

Major-General Maxwell Brander CB OBE
- Born: 11 October 1884
- Died: 30 October 1972 (aged 88)
- Military career
- Allegiance: United Kingdom
- Branch: British Army
- Service years: 1906–1949
- Rank: Major-General
- Unit: Royal Army Service Corps
- Commands: Royal Army Service Corps Training Centre (1933–36)
- Conflicts: First World War; Second World War
- Awards: Companion of the Order of the Bath; Officer of the Order of the British Empire; Mentioned in Despatches

Major-General Maxwell Spieker Brander, CB, OBE (11 October 1884 – 30 October 1972) was a senior British Army officer during the Second World War.

== Military career ==
Born on 11 October 1884, Maxwell Brander was educated at Bedford School and at the Royal Military College, Sandhurst.

He received his first commission in the British Army in 1906. He served during the First World War and was mentioned in despatches. Promoted to the rank of major general in 1936, he was Director of Supplies and Transport at the War Office between 1937 and 1940, and Deputy Director-General of Mechanisation at the Ministry of Supply between 1941 and 1947, and Colonel-Commandant of the Royal Army Service Corps from 1942 to 1949.

Brander was appointed an Officer of the Order of the British Empire in 1925, and a Companion of the Order of the Bath in 1937. He retired from the British Army in 1949 and died on 30 October 1972.

== Bibliography ==
- Smart, Nick (2005). Biographical Dictionary of British Generals of the Second World War. Barnesley: Pen & Sword. ISBN 1844150496.
