= Thomas Gardiner (civil servant) =

Sir Thomas Robert Gardiner (8 March 1883 – 1 January 1964) was a British civil servant.

He was Director-General of the Post Office from 1936 to 1945 and Permanent Secretary of the Ministry of Home Security from 1939 to 1940.
