= Harold Beckwith Whitehouse =

Sir Harold Beckwith Whitehouse FRCS FRCOG (1882–1943) was professor of midwifery and diseases of women at the University of Birmingham. He served with the Royal Army Medical Corps during the First World War at No. 8 General Hospital in Rouen and No. 56 Hospital in Etaples. He was a foundation fellow of the Royal College of Obstetricians and Gynaecologists.
