= Sydney Jones (businessman) =

English shipowner and Liberal Party politician

Charles Sydney Jones
- Born: 7 February 1872
- Died: 16 February 1947 (aged 75)
- Occupation: Politician
- Political party: Liberal Party

Sir Charles Sydney Jones (7 February 1872 – 16 February 1947) was an English shipowner and Liberal Party politician.

== Family and education ==
Jones was the son of Charles William Jones, a shipowner from Liverpool. He attended Charterhouse School and Magdalen College, Oxford. He never married. In religion Jones was a Unitarian, a member of the Unitarian Church in Ullet Road, Liverpool. In 1921 he was elected President of the British and Foreign Unitarian Association. He got involved in public service through the church and later worked at the Liverpool University Settlement in boys clubs and in the establishment of maternity and ante-natal clinics.

== Career ==
Jones followed his father into the shipping industry. He was a member of the firm of Alfred Holt and Co. of Liverpool, the owners of the Blue Funnel shipping line. He was sometime Chairman of the Liverpool Steamship Owners' Association.

== Politics ==
=== Local politics ===
Jones entered municipal politics in Liverpool first becoming a member of the City Council in 1908. He was later created an Alderman and served as Lord Mayor of Liverpool from 1938 to 1942. He was appointed High Sheriff of Lancashire for the year 1929-1930 and also served as a Justice of the Peace. Jones was knighted in the 1937 Coronation Honours. During the early years of Second World War, when the city was the subject of severe bombing attacks from the enemy, he was a prominent member of the Liverpool Emergency Committee and he set up the Air Raid Distress Fund to help victims of the bombing. He later had the honour, as Lord Mayor, of greeting Prime Minister, Winston Churchill on his surprise visit to Liverpool on 27 September 1941. He was made an honorary freeman of the City of Liverpool.

=== Education ===
Jones had a particular interest in secondary and further education. He was a long serving member of the City Council's Education Committee. He was a member of the Council of Liverpool University and variously the university's Treasurer (1918–1930), President of the Council of the university (1930–1936) and Pro-Chancellor (1936–1942). The institution later rewarded him with an Honorary Doctorate of Laws. He was a significant benefactor of the university. When he died, he left Liverpool University a considerable legacy consisting of his home and effects and the residue of his estate after other bequests. Jones was an avid art collector. Among the items he left to the university were illuminated manuscripts, watercolours and ceramics. His collections were not inherited family heirlooms but were collected by him during his lifetime. He had already made a gift to the university of his collection of fine English china in 1939.

=== Parliamentary candidate ===
Jones was selected as Liberal candidate for the constituency of Liverpool West Derby for the general election of 1923. In a straight fight with the sitting Conservative MP, Sir William Hall, he gained a majority of 1,990 votes. The 1922 general election had also been a straight fight but on that occasion Sir William Hall had been opposed by a Labour candidate with no Liberal intervention. Whether this taking it in turns to contest the seat represented some kind of formal arrangement between the parties is not clear but it was reported that the Labour Party was working with Jones in the election and this was expected to be politically very helpful. However, by the 1924 general election, the Tory Party had revived and the contest in West Derby was now a three-cornered affair with Jones facing a new Conservative opponent, John Sandeman Allen as well as Labour's T G Adams. As a result, Jones lost the seat to the Conservatives, with Labour gaining second place. He did not stand for Parliament again.

He was appointed High Sheriff of Lancashire in 1929.

== Death ==
In 1945, at the age of 73, Jones was attacked by burglars at his then home in Sefton Park, suffered head injuries, and was left in a critical condition. He made a gradual recovery but the injuries left him weakened. Jones died at his home, Eastbourne, Princes Park, Liverpool aged 75 years.

== Papers ==
A collection of papers consisting of the Grant of Arms by Garter Principal King of Arms and Norroy King of Arms and a device or badge to Jones (26 March 1929), a copy of his will and a photograph of Nettlestead Chace, his former residence, are kept in the archives at Liverpool University.

Parliament of the United Kingdom
Preceded by Reginald Hall	Member of Parliament for Liverpool West Derby; 1923–1924	Succeeded by John Sandeman Allen
