= Esplen =

Esplen may refer to:

- Esplen (Pittsburgh), Pennsylvania
- Esplen baronets, a title in the Baronetage of the United Kingdom
- John Esplen (1863–1930), English shipbuilder
