= Christopher Floyd =

English barrister and judge

Sir Christopher David Floyd, PC (born 20 December 1951), is a retired English barrister and judge. He served as a Lord Justice of Appeal from 2013 until 2021.

== Career ==
The son of David and Hana Floyd, Floyd was educated at Westminster School and Trinity College, Cambridge, where he took his degree in Natural Sciences and Law. He was called to the bar at Inner Temple in 1975 and became a Bencher of his inn in 2001. In 1988, he was called to the bar of the Republic of Ireland and in 1992 was appointed a Queen's Counsel. He was appointed an Assistant Recorder in 1994 and a Recorder in 2000, being authorised as a deputy High Court judge and assigned to the Patents Court in 1998. He served as Deputy Chairman of the Copyright Tribunal from 1995 to 2007. On 5 November 2007, he was appointed a High Court judge, receiving the customary knighthood, and assigned to the Chancery Division. On 9 April 2013, he was appointed a Lord Justice of Appeal and consequently appointed to the Privy Council.

== Other appointments ==
- 1996–2007: Member, Bar Council Chairman's Arbitration/Conciliation Panel
- 1998–2002: Member, Bar Council Professional Conduct and Complaints Committee
- 2000–2004: Member, Bar Council
- 2003–2004: Bar Council European Committee
- 1999–2004: Chairman, Intellectual Property Bar Association
- 2009– : Chairman, Permanent Exhibition of Legal Costume

== Notable cases ==
A case brought by the musician Bobby Valentino in 2002 attracted media attention after Valentino performed the violin in court to illustrate a point, convincing Floyd to rule in his favour and award him damages of £100,000.

In 2010, Liverpool Football Club's creditors, including the Royal Bank of Scotland, went to court to allow the club's board to proceed with selling it. Floyd ruled in favour of the creditors, thus paving the way for the sale of the club to New England Sports Ventures. On 15 October 2010, Liverpool F. C. was sold to NESV for £300 million.

In June 2011, Floyd heard a case brought by ITV et al. against the internet television platform TVCatchup. He ruled that TVCatchup's defence of relying on section 73 of the Copyright Design and Patents Act 1988 (CDPA88) was valid, allowing the service to retransmit "qualifying services", namely all BBC services, ITV1, Channel 4 and Channel 5, over the internet. However, he excluded retransmission of any other channels under these provisions as well as retransmission to 3G mobile devices. He referred to the European Court of Justice (ECJ) for guidance on some aspects of the case. Notwithstanding the ECJ ruling that the re-transmission in question was a communication to the public within the meaning of article 3(1) of Directive 2001/29, in his final order, he maintained the right of TVCatchup to rely on CDPA88 for the retransmission as a cable service of the qualifying services.

=== Judgments ===
- Relfo Ltd v Varsani [2014] EWCA Civ 360 - English unjust enrichment law concerning to what extent enrichment of the defendant must be at the expense of the claimant; Floyd LJ concurring with Arden LJ
- St John Webster v Ashcroft [2013] EWHC 1316

== Private life ==
In 1974 Floyd married Rosalind Jane Arscott, and they have one son and two daughters. He is a member of the Garrick Club.
