= Relfo Ltd v Varsani =

- Court: Court of Appeal
- Citation: [2014] EWCA Civ 360

Case history
- Prior action: [2012] EWHC 2168 (Ch)

Court membership
- Judges sitting: Arden LJ, Gloster LJ, Floyd LJ

Keywords
- Expense of the claimant

Relfo Ltd (in liq) v Varsani [2014] EWCA Civ 360 is an English unjust enrichment law case, concerning to what extent enrichment of the defendant must be at the expense of the claimant.

== Facts ==
The liquidator of Relfo Ltd sued Varsani, a friend of the former director, who got money from the company. HMRC had sued Relfo Ltd for outstanding tax, whereupon Relfo Ltd put the £500,000 it had in its bank account to pay $890,050 into a Latvian account of Mirren Ltd, and then coincidentally an entity called Intertrade paid $878,469 from a Lithuanian bank account to Varsani. Shortly after Mr Varsani gave Mr Gorecia $100,000 The liquidator argued this was all connected, and the $100,000 was Mr Gorecia’s reward for diverting Relfo’s funds for Varsani’s benefit. Therefore, Relfo Ltd retained a title in equity over the funds that Mr Varsani held, that Varsani was on notice of the facts at all times and so was a constructive trustee, and that even if tracing was not possible the payments were connected enough to base an unjust enrichment claim.

== Judgment ==
=== High Court ===
Sales J held the liquidator could recover the money. A proprietary argument against Varsani failed because the funds were dissipated and the liquidator had not applied for an order (which could have been done) to disclose where the funds went, which would be necessary for a tracing exercise. However, Varsani was a knowing recipient, it was a fair inference that all the transactions were linked, there was no reason for the Intertrade payment. His conscience would be affected as a constructive trustee because it was high probable that the director had explained Mr Varsani the whole arrangement, cf Re Montagu’s ST [1987] Ch 264. He was liable to account for the whole Intertrade payment without any reduction for the $100,000 transferred. And, even if the Intertrade payment could not be traced from the payment between Relfo Ltd and Mirren Ltd, Varsani was enriched at Relfo’s expense, as the payments were made in breach of Mr Gorecia’s fiduciary duty, without authority and established an in personam claim against Mr Varsani. Liability was strict and did not depend on knowledge or conscience. Mr Varsani had given no defence, and so he received the money as a volunteer.

=== Court of Appeal ===
The Court of Appeal held that the liquidator of Relfo Ltd was entitled to be repaid money that had ended up in Versani’s hands because the sums were causally linked through various transactions.

Arden LJ held that Sales J was right to draw the inference that Relfo Ltd’s money passed into Intertrade’s account, and this made the source of money paid to Varsani, as in El Ajou v Dollar Land Holdings plc [1993] 3 All ER 717 (Millett J), based on the amounts and the timing of the payment to Mirren and the Intertrade payment, because the amount Varsani received was the same as the Relfo Ltd to Mirren payment, because no consideration was given, and because this is what Gorecia had intended. An intention alone would not be enough under the tracing rules, but could be relevant for drawing an inference. What mattered was that value was exchanged, in a chain of substitutes. Payments did not need to occur in chronological or any other particular order. Although not necessary, in a claim for unjust enrichment, it did not matter that Varsani had not received the Intertrade payment directly from Relfo Ltd. In substance and economic reality Varsani had been a direct recipient. Arden LJ said the following.

74. On this appeal, Mr Salter submits that, if Relfo has no tracing claim, it likewise has no claim in unjust enrichment. Mr Salter submits that the cases show that normally the defendant has to be a person to whom the claimant directly transferred the benefit. Mr Salter accepts that there are a number of exceptions, for example, where a tracing claim is available. The present position, submits Mr Salter, is that there is no general principle. He relies on section 8 of A Restatement of the English Law of Unjust Enrichment by Professor Andrew Burrows, (Oxford, 2012) ("the Restatement"). This valuable work presents the position in the following way:

"8 At the claimant's expense: general

(1) The defendant's enrichment is at the claimant's expense if the benefit obtained by the defendant is-

(a) from the claimant and

(b) directly from the claimant rather than by way of another person.

(2) In any of the following cases, it does not matter that the benefit obtained by the defendant (D) is from the claimant (C) by way of another person (X) –

(a) where X transfers as an asset to D but C has a better right to that asset than X;

(b) where X transfers an asset to D but X was holding the asset on trust for C;

(c) where X is acting as C's agent in respect of the benefit;

(d) where X charges and receives from C an amount representing tax on X's supply of goods and services to C and pays or accounts for that amount to D (Her Majesty's Revenue and Customs) as tax due;

(e) where C is subrogated to X's (or another's) present or former rights against D in a situation where the benefit was supplied to D by X;

(f) where X was under a legal obligation to supply the benefit to C but instead supplied the benefit to D and –

(i) the supply to D discharged X's obligation to C, or

(ii) the supply to D was in breach of X's fiduciary duty to C but C's claim against X has been exhausted.

(3) In a contract for the benefit of a third party, the third party's benefit is to be treated as obtained directly from the contracting party who required the benefit to be supplied rather than from the contracting party who supplied it.

(4) Even if the benefit obtained by the defendant is directly from the claimant, the enrichment is generally not at the claimant's expense if the benefit is merely incidental to the furtherance by the claimant of an objective unconnected with the defendant's enrichment."

75. Professor Burrows calls the principle now set out in section 8 "the direct providers only" rule, though he accepts there are exceptions to it. I will therefore refer to it as "the DPR". Section 8 is a very useful point of reference but I must not be taken as accepting that, if there is a DPR, section 8 contains an exhaustive list of the exceptions.

76. Mr Salter also accepts that some writers have favoured a wider principle than the DPR, such as the editors of Goff & Jones on The Law of Unjust Enrichment (8th ed, 2011) at paras 6-18 and 6-25, Stephen Watterson, Direct Transfers in the Law of Unjust Enrichment, Current Legal Problems 64 (2011), pp 435-470, Charles Mitchell, "Liability Chains" in Unjust Enrichment in Commercial Law, ed. Degeling and Edelman (2008) and Professor Peter Birks, Unjust Enrichment (2nd ed) pp 94-5.

77. Mr Salter accepts that Mr Bhimji Varsani cannot rely on any defence: in particular he does not now claim that he was a bona fide purchaser of the Intertrade payment.

78. The DPR raises some immediate questions. Why should the law impose a rule that there can be no claim in unjust enrichment unless the defendant happens to receive the benefit directly from the claimant rather than from the claimant via a third party, and then allow a long list of what might be called ad hoc exceptions? The answer to this question is that DPR is a rule about limiting the substitution of new property or rights for the property which leaves the claimant's hands. It may be very unjust to allow the claimant to recover the new property or rights if he has no tracing claim, for example, where the immediate recipient made a gift to the defendant of an amount equal to what he had received from the claim and this transaction of gift was independent of his transaction with the claimant. The claimant may, moreover, end up being able to recover his property from a number of defendants at different stages in the chain.

79. On this basis, the "exceptions" represent the boundaries (thus far ascertained) of recoverability for indirect unjust enrichment. It is not enough for the claimant to show the defendant is better off by the amount by which the claimant is worse off. That does not even satisfy a "but for" test of causation. Some greater link is required to be shown.

80. Likewise the list of exceptions raises questions. The exceptions are a motley collection. Some of them are principles from other areas of law, such as trust law, and some of them are remedies, such as subrogation, which do not constitute a basis of liability. They are not, therefore, principles for imposing liability for unjust enrichment carved out of the DPR.

81. Mr Salter's submissions involve the analysis of a large number of authorities, including Filby v Mortgage Express (No 2) Ltd [2004] EWCA Civ 759, Banque Financière de la Cité v Parc Battersea Ltd [1991] 1 AC 221 and Kleinwort Benson Ltd v Birmingham City Council [1997] QB 380. We were also taken for completeness to Gibbs v Maidstone and Tunbridge Wells NHS Trust [2010] EWCA Civ 678, and Uren v First National Home Finance Ltd [2005] EWHC 2529 (Ch) but they do not significantly assist on the question of whether a principle exists which defines when a claimant can succeed on his claim in unjust enrichment against an indirect recipient.

82. Mr Salter accepts that the decision of Henderson J in Investment Trust Companies v HMRC [2012] EWHC 458 (Ch); [2012] STC 1150 ("ITC") is the first case in which the question of the nature of the connection has been squarely addressed. In that case, clients of Investment Management Companies sought to recover overpaid VAT from the HMRC, to whom it was paid by their investment managers, on the basis that the HMRC had been unjustly enriched, indirectly at their expense. The managers had not reclaimed this VAT. Henderson J held:

"[68] The real question, therefore, is whether claims of the present type should be treated as exceptions to the general rule. So far as I am aware, no exhaustive list of criteria for the recognition of exceptions has yet been put forward by proponents of the general rule, and I think it is safe to assume that the usual preference of English law for development in a pragmatic and step-by-step fashion will prevail. Nevertheless, in the search for principle a number of relevant considerations have been identified, including (in no particular order):

(a) the need for a close causal connection between the payment by the claimant and the enrichment of the indirect recipient;

(b) the need to avoid any risk of double recovery, often coupled with a suggested requirement that the claimant should first be required to exhaust his remedies against the direct recipient;

(c) the need to avoid any conflict with contracts between the parties, and in particular to prevent 'leapfrogging' over an immediate contractual counterparty in a way which would undermine the contract; and

(d) the need to confine the remedy to disgorgement of undue enrichment, and not to allow it to encroach into the territory of compensation or damages."

83. Henderson J came to his conclusion that the weight of authority was in favour of the DPR with a limited number of exceptions after very careful consideration of all but two of the authorities cited by Mr Salter. Little purpose would be served by my performing the same exercise as I agree with his analysis of those cases.

84. Faced with that authority, Henderson J concluded that there was no authority which required him to hold that there was any general principle which allowed unjust enrichment claims against indirect recipients. He held that such guidance as was available to him suggested that there was no general principle, so far as claims against indirect recipients were concerned. There was only a list of exceptions. He did not regard that as a closed list but went on to identify the criteria in paragraph 68, which I have set out above. He effectively created the exception now found in section 8(2)(d) of the Restatement.

[...]

88. For reasons which I develop below, I consider that the judge's ultimate conclusion was correct notwithstanding the withdrawal of the concession in this court. Furthermore, in my judgment, Menelaou supports the argument that, where the defendant is not the direct recipient of the benefit provided by the claimant, and the claimant has no proprietary right to any asset in the defendant's hands, unjust enrichment may be available on the basis of a general principle rather than on the basis of bringing the case within (say) one of the specific situations in section 8 of the Restatement.

[...]

90. This court found particular support for this approach in two of the cases cited to us. The first was Banque Financière. In that case, as Floyd LJ explains, in order to circumvent disclosure obligations a bank lent money first to the general manager (Mr Herzig) of the bank who in turn lent the money to another company who used it to discharge a loan from RTB, another bank. The Appellate Committee of the House of Lords was unimpressed by the fact that Mr Herzig was interposed as borrower and lender. Lord Hoffmann, with whom a majority of the House agreed, held that to allow the interposition of Mr Herzig to alter the substance of the transaction would be pure formalism. He further held:

"I think it should be recognised that one is here concerned with a restitutionary remedy and that the appropriate questions are therefore, first, whether the defendant would be enriched at the plaintiff's expense; secondly, whether such enrichment would be unjust and thirdly, whether there are nevertheless reasons of policy for denying a remedy. An example of a case which failed on the third ground is Orakpo v Manson Investments Ltd. [1975] AC 95, in which it was considered that restitution would be contrary to the terms and policy of the Moneylenders Acts."

91. The second case was Filby v Mortgage Express. In that case, again as Floyd LJ explains, Mr and Mrs Filby's matrimonial home was subject to a mortgage in favour of the Halifax. They also had an unsecured development loan account with the Midland Bank. Mr Filby sought to remortgage the matrimonial home with Mortgage Express. The mortgage advance was paid to solicitors who used part of it to redeem the Halifax mortgage and another part in the reduction of the debit balance on the development loan account with the Midland. However, Mrs Filby had not signed the mortgage, and so, as against her, it was void. Mortgage Express claimed to be subrogated, amongst other things, to the rights of the Midland Bank against Mrs Filby to the extent that the joint debt to them had been discharged with their money. This court considered the unjust enrichment claim obiter. At [62] May LJ stated:

"Accordingly so far as is relevant to this appeal, the remedy of equitable subrogation is a restitutionary remedy available to reverse what would otherwise be unjust enrichment of a defendant at the expense of the claimant. The defendant is enriched if his financial position is materially improved, usually as here where the defendant is relieved of a financial burden – see Peter Birks, An Introduction to The Law of Restitution page 93. The enrichment will be at the expense of the claimant if in reality it was the claimant's money which effected the improvement. Subject to special defences, questions of policy or exceptional circumstances affecting the balance of justice, the enrichment will be unjust if the claimant did not get the security he bargained for when he advanced the money which in reality effected the improvement, and if the defendant's financial improvement is properly seen as a windfall. The remedy does not extend to giving the claimant more than he bargained for. The remedy is not limited to cases where either or both the claimant and defendant intended that the money advanced should be used to effect the improvement. It is sufficient that it was in fact in reality so used. The remedy is flexible and adaptable to produce a just result. Within this framework, the remedy is discretionary in the sense that at each stage it is a matter of judgment whether on the facts the necessary elements are fulfilled."

92. I agree with Henderson J that the "reality" which May LJ was invoking was not confined to strictly legal reality, but could in appropriate circumstances include a broader underlying commercial or economic reality (judgment, [65]).

93. This court accepted in Menelaou that the bank had released the charge over the parents' house with a view to its obtaining security over the daughter's house. The majority relied on economic reality. Moses LJ, however, did not think it was necessary to rely on economic reality as such on the grounds that this test was uncertain and that a decision-maker might use this concept because he was unable to articulate his real reasoning.

94. This court also relied on the fact that there had been a transfer of value, but given that there had been no transfer of value in law, this does not detract from the reasoning based on economic reality. In all the circumstances, Floyd LJ concluded at [42] of his judgment:

"Whilst the precise range of relevant factors which are relevant may require consideration in other cases, for my part I would hold that there was a sufficiently close causal connection in the present case between the Bank's agreement to part with its estate in Rush Green Hall and the enrichment of Melissa to hold that Melissa was enriched at the Bank's expense."

95. Menelaou is, of course, a case about subrogation and thus one only of the exceptions listed in section 8(2) of the Restatement. Nonetheless, particularly read with the passage from the speech of Lord Hoffmann in Banque Financière and the dictum of May LJ set out above, the decision strongly supports the view that the law is moving towards identification of a general principle. Overall the court must find that there is a sufficient link between the formation of the transaction whereby the claimant conferred a benefit on the direct recipient (or was entitled to receive a benefit) and the transaction under which the defendant obtained a benefit to make the enrichment unjust. I do not read the judgments of Gloster and Floyd LJJ as taking any different view on that point. Moreover, in deciding whether there is a sufficient link, the court will look at the substance and not the form.

96. Any principle for unjust enrichment against indirect recipients will have to be refined in later cases. For now, the criteria identified by Henderson J will no doubt be of assistance. They identify important policy considerations for the application of the law in this area. As I see it, they are consistent with there being some ultimate general principle.

Gloster LJ concurred.

Floyd LJ concurred, and said the following.

[...] Short of applying the rigid exclusionary rule based on direct transfers only, the judge was bound to conclude on these particular facts that there was a sufficient causal connection between Relfo's loss and Bhimji Varsani's gain to provide for a remedy in unjust enrichment. I cannot accept the suggestion that the intervening and meaningless arrangements orchestrated by the director, which had no other purpose than to disguise the source of the funds diverted from Relfo, changed what would otherwise have been a direct payment into one which the law will not recognise as sufficiently proximate.

== See also ==
- English unjust enrichment law
