= Eileen Dewhurst =

British writer of mysteries (1929–2025)

- Born: Eileen Mary Dewhurst; 27 May 1929; Liverpool, England
- Died: December 2025 (aged 96); Cheshire, England
- Education: Huyton College for Girls; St. Anne's College, Oxford; B.A., 1951; M.A., 1956
- Occupation: Mystery writer

Eileen Dewhurst (27 May 1929 – December 2025) was a British writer of mysteries. Her published work included more than 20 crime novels, and her short stories have appeared in anthologies and in periodicals, including Ellery Queen's Mystery Magazine. Her memberships included the Society of Authors, the Crime Writers' Association, and the Oxford Union Society.

== Education and career ==
Born on 27 May 1929 in Liverpool, England, Dewhurst attended the Huyton College for Girls in Liverpool from 1937 to 1947, then St. Anne's College, Oxford, graduating with a B.A. in English in 1951 and an M.A. in 1956. She held academic administrative posts in London and Liverpool and at the Liverpool Chamber of Commerce from 1953 through 1964. From then through 1980, she worked as a freelance journalist. From 1976 through 1982, she was the official guide to the Lady Lever Art Gallery in Port Sunlight. Her novels began to appear in print in 1975.

== Critical reception ==
According to Martin Edwards in St. James Guide to Crime and Mystery Writers, Dewhurst favors plots that involve impersonation and disguise, including transvestism. Her writing style is "admirably unfussy", he says, and her stories are inventive rather than formulaic. She takes risks with her plots, and her best novels, such as A Private Prosecution, are "excellent". Her work, though "uneven", he says, "deserves to be better known."

The unevenness mentioned by Edwards is noted by others. A reviewer for Publishers Weekly praises Dewhurst for skillfully connecting the plot twists in Now You See Her but finds the "myriad and rapid name and character changes" of the protagonist, Phyllida Moon, "hard to credit." On the other hand, a review of a later Phyllida Moon novel, No Love Lost, praises the character changes as well as the plot: "Brisk dialogue and the complications of Moon's many alter egos add flair to this old-fashioned whodunit." Less impressed with No Love Lost is the reviewer for Kirkus Reviews, who finds Phyllida's alter egos unconvincing. This and other plot twists lead to a denouement "that doesn’t bear close scrutiny."

== Death ==
Dewhurst died in Cheshire, England in December 2025, at the age of 96.

== Bibliography ==
- Death Came Smiling (1975)
- After the Ball (1976)
- Curtain Fall (1977)
- Drink This (1980)
- Trio in Three Flats (1981)
- Whoever I Am (1982)
- The House That Jack Built (1983)
- There Was a Little Girl (1984)
- Playing Safe (1985)
- A Private Prosecution (1986)
- A Nice Little Business (1987)
- The Sleeper (1988)
- Dear Mr. Right (1990)
- The Innocence of Guilt (1991)
- Death in Candie Gardens (1992)
- Now You See Her (1995)
- The Verdict on Winter (1996)
- Alias the Enemy (1997)
- Roundabout (1998)
- Death of a Stranger (1999)
- Double Act (2000)
- Closing Stages (2001)
- No Love Lost (2001)
- Easeful Death (2002)
- Naked Witness (2003)
