= Brian Christian (teacher) =

Brian Christian MBE
- Born: John Donald Brian Christian
- Citizenship: British
- Education: King William College; University of Cambridge

John Donald Brian Christian is a Manx teacher and Headmaster, who was Principal of The British School in Tokyo having previously been the principal of Liverpool College.

Christian was born on the Isle of Man, where he attended King William's College he went on to read English literature at the University of Cambridge.

== Career ==
He started his teaching career teaching at his former school King Williams College, before going on to become Deputy Head Master of Giggleswick School a post he was in for 7 years.

Christian then went on to become Principal of Liverpool College in 2002, Christian was featured in a documentary about the killer Brian Blackwell who was at the time a sixth form student at the school. Christian was principal for 5 years and departed the school in 2007.

He then moved aboard to lead at British international schools in Singapore and Shanghai.

In 2012 he was appointed as the Principal of The British school in Tokyo, he served as principal for 7 years, alongside of this he served as a board member of the Council of British International Schools, for his time as the school he was awarded an MBE by the Queen in 2019. He retired in 2019 and moved back to England.

== Honours ==
In the 2019 New Years honours list, Christian was awarded the honour of Member of The Most Excellent Order of the British Empire (MBE) by the Queen for For services to education and the community in Tokyo.
