= Liverpool College =

School in Mossley Hill, Liverpool

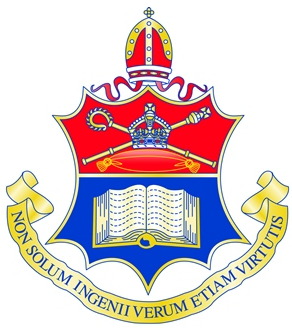

Location
- Queen's Drive; Liverpool, Merseyside, L18 8BG; England; 53.382°N 2.922°W

Information
- Type: Academy (formerly private); Day and boarding
- Motto: 'Non solum ingenii verum etiam virtutis' ('Not only the intellect, but also the character')
- Religious affiliation: Church of England
- Established: 1840; 186 years ago
- Local authority: Liverpool
- Department for Education URN: 139686 Tables
- Ofsted: Reports
- Principal: Alison Haynes
- Gender: Mixed
- Age: 3 to 19
- Enrolment: 1646
- Colour
- Alumni: Old Lerpoolians
- Website: liverpoolcollege.org.uk

Liverpool College is a coeducational day and boarding school in Mossley Hill, Liverpool, England. It was one of the thirteen founding members of the Headmasters' Conference.

== History ==
Liverpool College was the first of many public schools founded in the Victorian Era. The foundation stone of the original building was laid on 22 October 1840 by Lord Stanley, M.P. (who later became the 14th Earl of Derby, K.G.), the first patron of the college. A group of Christian Liverpool citizens, many of whose names are now famous in the annals of the city, then began the building of a school where education might be combined with 'sound religious knowledge'. The original building in Shaw Street (now apartments) is in the so-called Tudor-Gothic style. It was designed by Mr. Harvey Lonsdale Elmes, and was erected at a cost of £35,000.

The college was opened on 6 January 1843 by the Right Hon. William Ewart Gladstone (afterwards four time Prime Minister of the United Kingdom) and the same distinguished son of Liverpool showed his interest in the college by delivering a second great speech in the hall on founders' day in 1857. The College consisted of three institutions – Upper, Middle and Lower Schools. While these schools were under the control of one and the same Principal, they were kept entirely separate. The Lower, or Commercial School, was intended for boys who were to go into business houses at an early age. The Middle School combined literary and scientific training, with special attention to modern languages for boys leaving for business or the professions. The Upper School was a first grade public school with leaving exhibitions for Oxford and Cambridge. Though the schools were distinct in theory and fact, the foundation was unique, in that the Principal was empowered to nominate a certain number of promising boys for entrance to a higher school on the terms of the lower.

The Liverpool College for Girls at Grove Street was established in 1856. The Liverpool College for Girls, Huyton, or Huyton College as it was popularly known, was started in 1894 and intended to be parallel to the Boys Upper School. The Liverpool College Preparatory School at Fairfield was also founded in 1898. The Council of Liverpool College was therefore one of the most important governing bodies in the kingdom, with 6 schools under its control.

Liverpool College has occupied three sites since its foundation in 1840, unusual for a public school. The Upper School of what was then officially called 'Liverpool Collegiate' (since 1863), was moved from Shaw Street to Lodge Lane, Sefton Park in 1884 through the efforts of Rev. Selwyn. The erection of new school buildings started in 1887 and were completed in 1890. The first instance of a site in Mossley Hill occurred in 1896 where several acres were purchased as playing fields with the present pavilion being built in 1905. All ties with the Original building were severed in 1907 when it was sold to the Liverpool Corporation, and the masters and boys of the Middle and Lower schools remained to form the Liverpool Collegiate School. From 1917 to 1936 more land and buildings were purchased at the Site in Mossley Hill. The Junior wing (presently Mossley Vale) was opened by Lord Stanley and the foundation stone of St.Peter's chapel was laid by Mr. H. Sutton Timmis, Chairman of the governors.

The college has held land on the present 26 acre (105,000 m^{2}) site since 1896. In 1993 the Liverpool College for Girls, Huyton or Huyton College merged with Liverpool College to become a coeducational day school.

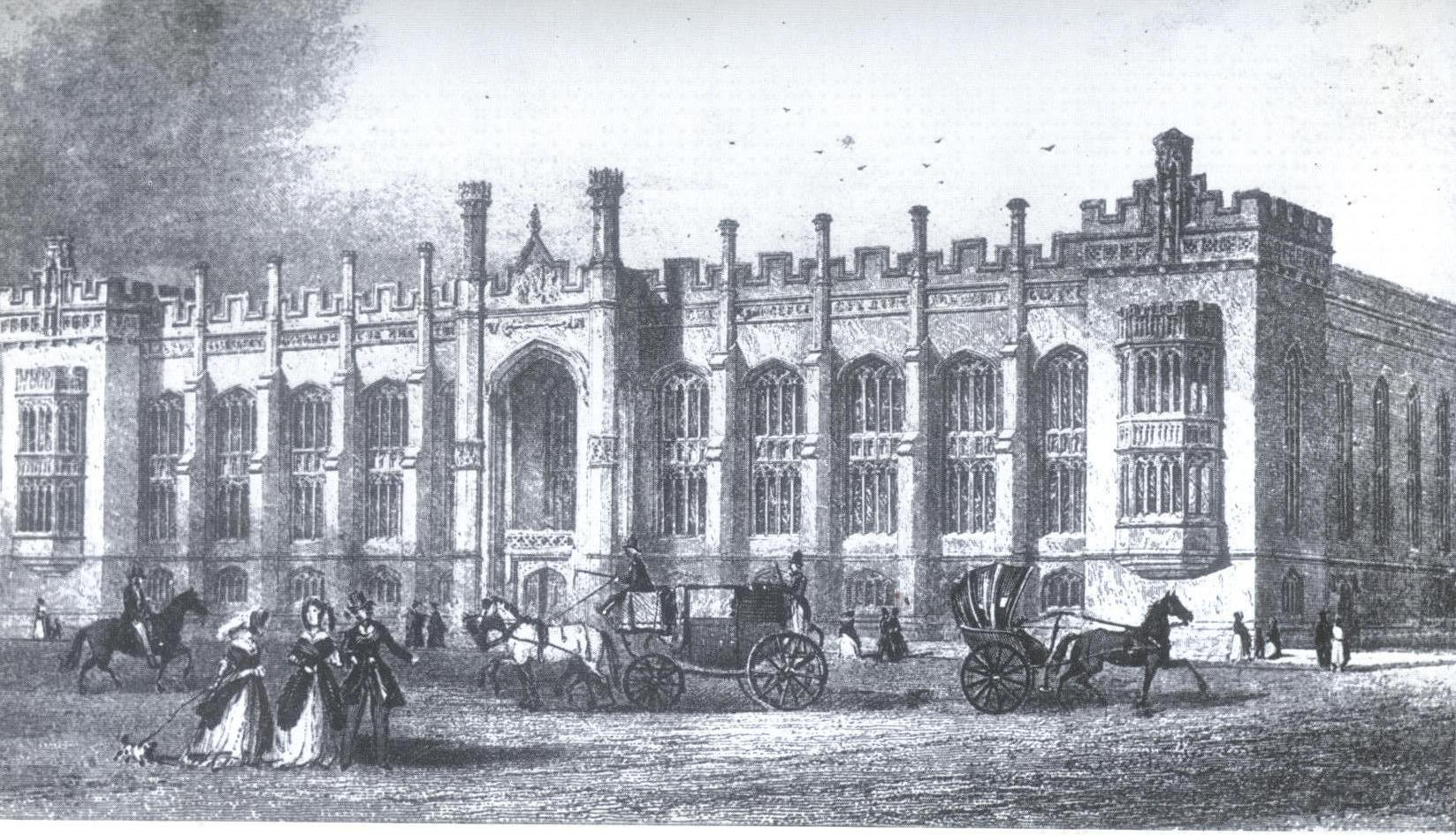
The Original School on Shaw Street 1840-1907

The school is situated in Mossley Hill on North Mossley Hill Road and backing onto Queens Drive. Facilities on site include a fully equipped gymnasium and relaxation centre as well as AstroTurf courts and a Combined Cadet Force centre. It had been decided to proceed with plans to concentrate the whole school in what is currently the Lower School site, in a series of projects to construct newer and more up-to-date buildings. However, due to having planning permission rejected and also the financial situation, these plans were shelved indefinitely and instead a gradual programme of wholesale refurbishment of the school began in 2009.

In 2010 boarding began to return to the school and In September 2013 the school formally became an Academy, an independent school that is funded by central government, and therefore non-fee paying.

== Boarding and international school ==
In September 2010, Liverpool College became a boarding school once again. As a consequence, the college extended its provision to include international students. However, when the school became an academy in 2013, boarding places at the school were now only available for UK and EU nationals. The school has become, therefore, one of the few state boarding schools in England.

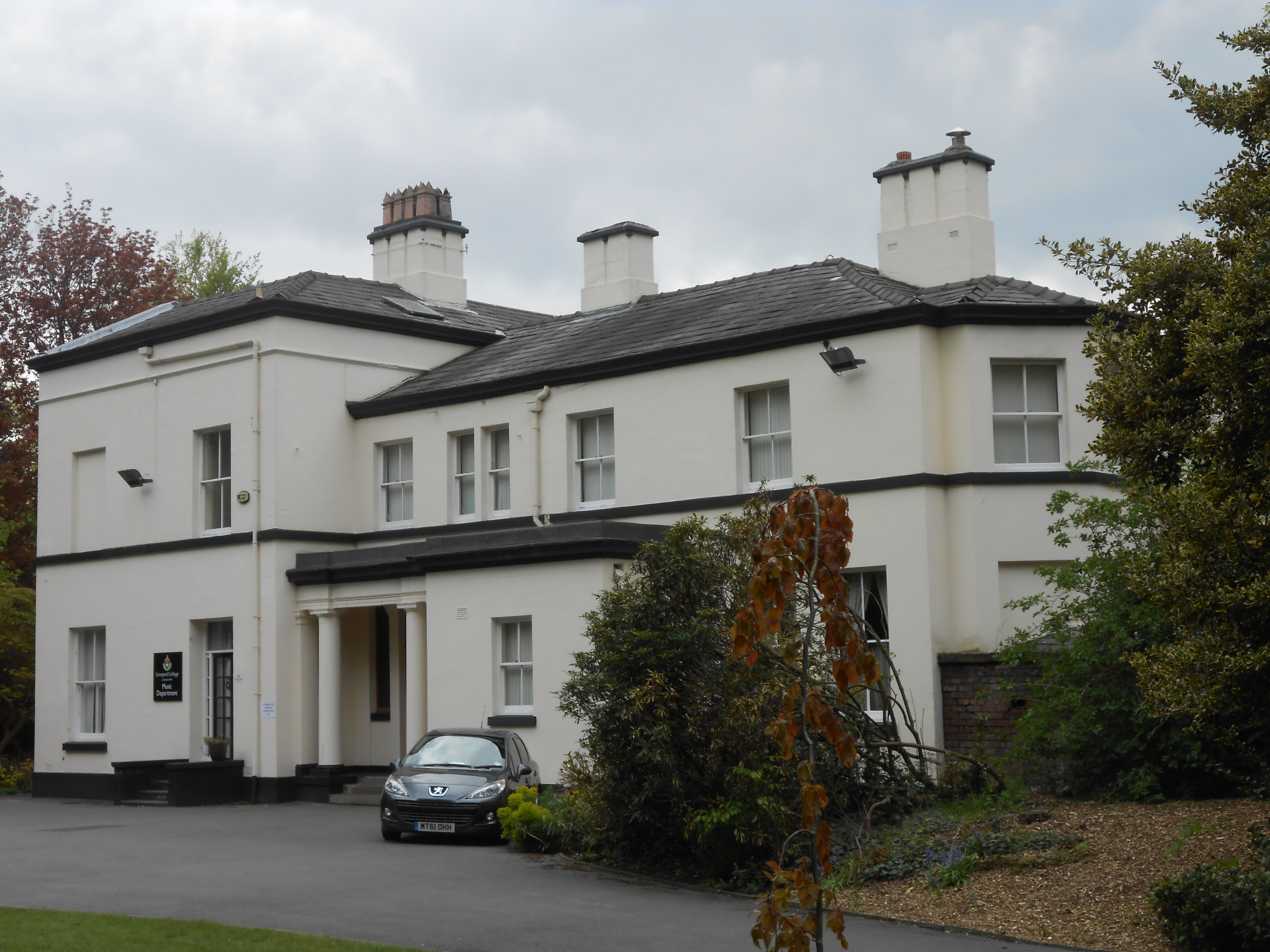
Beechlands, the current boarding house

For a short time "Liverpool College International" was a legally separate fee-paying international school located on the Liverpool College campus which was primarily for international students. The international school was set in its own buildings at the campus, but leased some of College's facilities.

Liverpool College International was merged into the boarding program of Liverpool College in 2017

Today Liverpool College retains its boarding programme and has expanded it in 2020, with students available to board from year 7 up to year 13. it remains one of the few state boarding schools in the England.

The boarding house is currently based in Beechlands, a renovated Victorian house on the college campus, The building was previously the music department and before that was the onsite home and office of previous principals and their Family.

== School structure ==
Liverpool College is divided into two phases and comprises five distinct schools, with the principal serving as the overall leader of the College. Since 2019 all areas of the college share the same house structure.

=== Primary phase (Pre-Prep and Preparatory Schools) ===
The primary phase of Liverpool College, from the ages of 4-11, is Located in the Liverpool College Pre-Prep and Prep School, created in 1898. The Prep currently occupies buildings on the Mossley Vale side of the campus site. Previously the Pre-Prep (Nursery to Year 2) Occupied Godywn House, formerly the boarding house. In 2019 a New Pre-Prep building was built attached to the Preparatory School building, with Godwyn becoming the Sixth Form, and Music building. The Nursey phase was removed following the move to the new building with the Pre-Prep starting in Reception. This same year the Prep and Pre-Prep where combined under one Head of Primary, replacing the Previous posts of Head of the Preparatory School and Head of Pre-Prep. Pupils sit their SATs at the end of Primary.

The Head of Primary oversees the Prep and Pre-Prep and is one of the Vice Principals of Liverpool College.

Since 2019 The Prep and Pre-Prep use the same houses has the rest of the College (Brook's, Butler's, Howson's, Howard's, School, Selwyn's) replacing the separate houses that where used previously.

=== Secondary Phase (Middle & Upper Schools and Sixth Form) ===
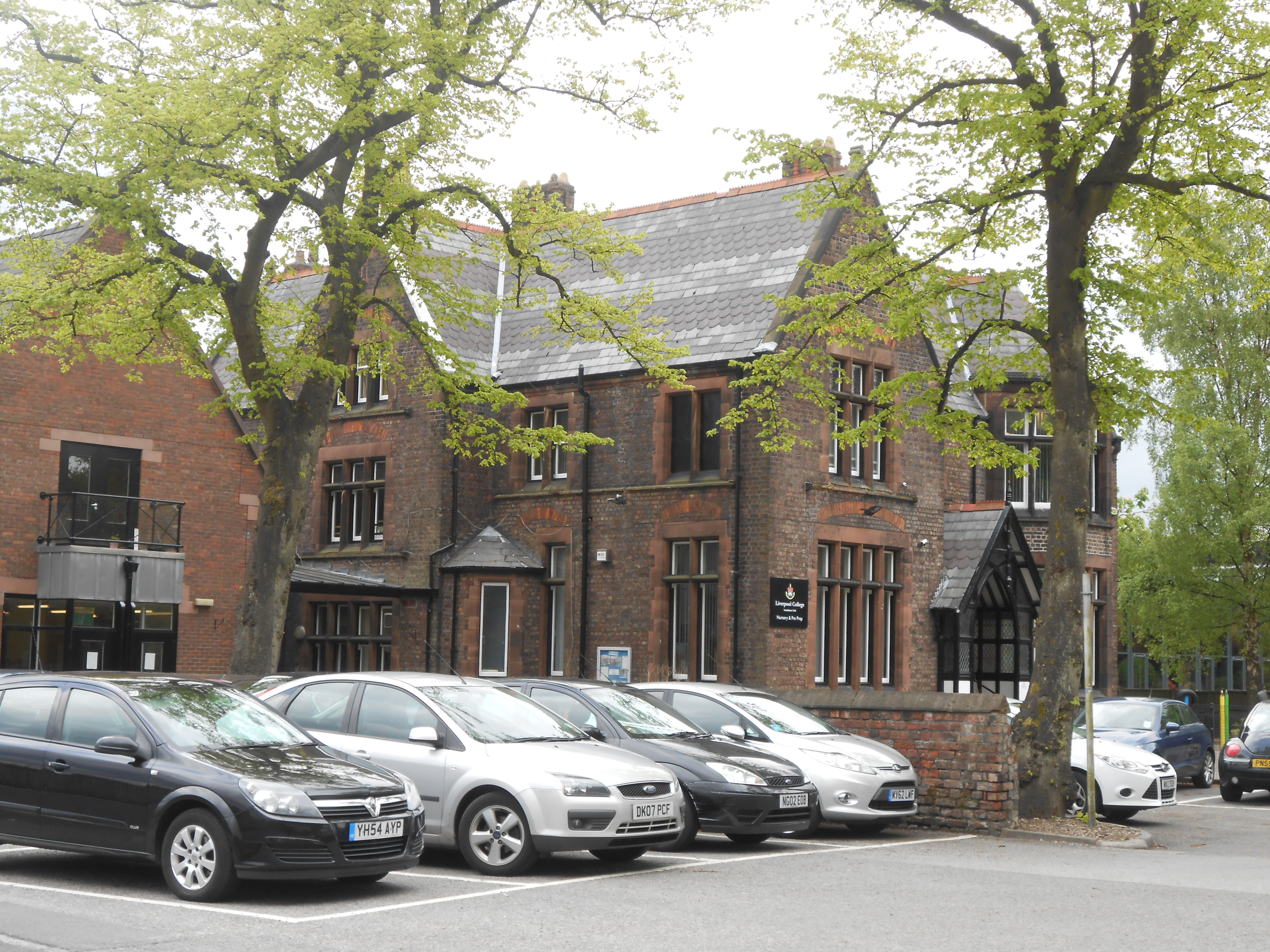
Godwyn House, Currently used as the Sixth Form Centre

The Secondary phase of Liverpool College comprises the Senior School and the Sixth Form. The Senior School is the largest part of the College, which is further split between the Middle School (Years 7-9) and Upper School (Years 10-11). It is housed in buildings across the Colleges' campus. Pupils undertake GCSE Examinations at the End of the Senior School.

The Sixth Form (Years 12-13) is based in Godywn House, a 19th Century Mansion on the College Campus, it was previously home to the Boarding House and Pre-Prep, Before this the Sixth Form was based in the Gladstone Villa (Besford Grange) another 19th Century mansion on the College site. Students sit their A-level examinations at the end of Sixth Form.

The Head of Secondary oversees the Senior School and Sixth Form and is one of the Vice Principals of Liverpool College, they are assisted by an Assistant Principal who is the Head of Sixth Form.

== Buildings and grounds ==
The College is situated on a site that comprises historical and modern buildings.

=== 1800s ===
The oldest of the Buildings on the campus date from the 1840's and consist of Godywn House, currently used as the Sixth Form building, but previously being home to the Pre-Prep prior to that was the boarding house known as School House, before coming under the ownership of the college Godwyn House was owned by Thomas Howarth Registrar of Liverpool County Court. Beechlands, The current boarding house of the school, which was formerly used as the Music Department prior to its renovation in 2019, before this, from 1957 it was the residence of the Principal of Liverpool College during their tenure. Mossley Vale House, The current Art building of the college and was historically used as the Junior boarding house. Gladstone Villa originally called Besford Grange before being renamed after Founder and Former Prime Minister William Ewart Gladstone, it was used as a Sixth Form area until 2019. Finally Conybeare which was renamed after the school took ownership of the original property, it is currently the College's administrative building and houses the Principals office.

=== 1900s ===
The 1900s saw a number of buildings constructed expanding the colleges site. the College's Pavilion known as the Cranston Pavilion was constructed in 1905 following the College's acquisition of the playing fields in 1894. In 1929 the College's lower school building also known as the Junior Wing was constructed, it now houses the Preparatory School. The College's chapel the Chapel of St. Peter was constructed in 1934 in a 1930s modern style and was dedicated to St Peter in 1935, it currently houses the College's Organ, as well as the War memorial boards of the Students of the College who died in combat during World War I and World War II. The 1950s saw two additions to college site, including Sutton Timmis Hall, built onto the Lower School which was used as the school's theatre until the construction of the MV Building, and the Dining Hall which finished construction in 1957, was built originally out of timber for the cost of £29,025, since then it has gone under a modern refurbishment.

Other developments from this century include Collison, named after L. H. Collison, which is connected to Conybare and Gladstone, The Haygarth Centre, named for R. V. Haygarth former Principal, Now commonly known as the Imagineering Block houses the College's IT and Design facilities as well as the College's Sports Hall which was opened by Anne, Princess Royal. As well as the Holland and Glazebrook blocks situated near Gladstone, and the Science Block, located behind the Dining Hall.

=== 2000s ===
The 2000s have seen a number of buildings being added to the college, including a new permanent Biology building. In 2014 the College constructed the MV Building, this modern building is attached to the old Mossley Vale house by a sky bridge, it contains a series of classrooms, a theatre and a small canteen. In 2018 the College built a new Pre-Prep Building attached onto the Prep School. In 2021 the College constructed the Chavasse VC Poolhouse built on the site of the Old Swimming pool named for N. G. Chavasse VC & Bar, MC, a decorated War Hero and former pupil of the College, It houses additional classrooms of the Prep School which is located next door.

In 2025 the College opened the Morris Building, it is the home of humanities and also houses a few scientific demonstration labs. The Morris Building is a modern style structure that is similar in appearance to the Mossley Vale block across the bridge.

=== Former and Additional Buildings ===
David House, on Park Avenue was the former homer location of the Prep School, it is presently occupied by a Liverpool based Nursery and no longer has affiliation to the School. There are a number of additional Houses, and Former Stables on the grounds of Liverpool College, many formerly used to house Staff, presently some are used for additional educational, administrative, maintenance and storage purposes, while others are in disrepair and are left abandoned. The College also has a series of Combined Cadet Force buildings located on the site.

== Constitution ==
Liverpool College is a registered charity and its objects are "to provide for the inhabitants of Liverpool and others, by the establishment and maintenance of Lectures, School, and other like means, an education suited to their wants upon the most moderate terms; and for this purpose instruction in the doctrines and duties of Christianity, as taught by the Church of England, shall be forever communicated, in combination with literary, scientific, and commercial information."

In 2006-7 it had a gross annual income of £6,803,367.

== Houses ==
Until 1992 the school was organised under a clearly defined house system, as in most public schools. In the same year two of the previous houses were removed and the school was re-organised into year groups in lieu of the traditional house structure that had existed: School House (the college's boarding house since 1917 however as of its 2017 reintroduction it is no longer the boarding house) and Howards House were removed while Brooks, Butlers, Howsons and Selwyns Houses remained.

In addition, the Lower School had its own house system for many years, named for some of the notable alumni such as Chavasse and Glazebrook. There was also a section of the school named David House for younger pupils aged 5 to 9 years old.

In 2009, the College returned to its old (Upper School) House System. The four remaining houses were re-instated and gave the school a new lease of life. House activities have once again become a daily occurrence and pupils are registered in house groups meaning that the year system brought about in 1992 has almost vanished. In 2017, the college returned the two houses which were not reinstated in 2009 due to the college growing numbers.

In recent years the Lower School house system used by the Prep School has been replaced with the Upper School houses which are now used throughout all Years of the College.

The houses of the College as they currently stand:

House	Colour	Symbol	Motto	Named After
Brooks	White	Stag	Aeternum Progredior	Rt. Rev. Richard Brook
Butlers	Green	Gryphon	Prensum Elevo	Rev. Canon George Butler
Howards	Purple	Horse	Contemnit Pavorem	Rev. Canon Robert Wilmot Howard
Howsons	Blue	Lion	Nulla Vestigia Retrorsum	The Very Rev. John Saul Howson
School	Yellow	Dragon	Stet Fortuna Domus	(Note: School House - The name of this House derives from its former role of being the boarding house of the School)
Selwyns	Red	Porcupine	Toujours Prest	Rev. Edward Carus Selwyn

== Identity and traditions ==
=== Coat of arms ===
The Current Coat of Arms is based on the original 1840 design, incorporating symbolism to the colleges core values, incorporating church and state and education.

=== Motto ===
The motto 'Non solum ingenii verum etiam virtutis' (a quotation from Cicero) means 'Not only the intellect but also the character'. A local stone mason, known as Mr Spence, suggested the motto while working on the original College buildings. The same motto is still used today.

=== School song ===
The School song, Carmen Lerpoolense, is sung in Latin at major school events such as the Founders' Day Service and the College Speech Night & Prize Giving. The song was written in 1891 by the Rev T Nicklin then a Classical Master at the College. The tune that is now used was written by A.L Wilkinson, an Old Lerpoolian, in 1922.

=== Uniform ===
The colleges uniform is distinctive and differs slightly between the Prep school, Upper school. All students wear the school blazer which is black with red trims, featuring the coat of arms. Pupils in the prep school wear a distinctive red jumper while students in the Upper school wear a black variant of the Jumper. this is worn in conjunction with a shirt and tie, the tie worn by the Prep School tie is the same for all Prep pupils regardless of house, Where as the upper school tie features the coat of arms of the students house on it, ties are traditionally not worn by female students however in recent years the uniform policy has become more relaxed on gender exclusivity. Female students, wear the college skirt which features the College's Tartan on it.

In modern times Sixth Formers wear business attire, with male students typically wearing a sixth form tie emblazoned with the school arms, Certain prefects, such as the Heads of School and their deputies wear traditional Academic Prefecture Gowns or "Robes" at School events.

=== Grace ===
There was a long tradition of saying grace at the college. It is no longer in frequent use at the college, However it is said at Old Lerpoolian dinners where the Head Boy or Head Girl of the College is invited to deliver it, the wording of the Grace is:

Oculi omnium in te sperant, Domine, et tu das eis escam in tempore opportuno, tui sunt caeli et tua est terra, orbem terrae et plenitudinem eius tu fundasti; confitemini, Domino, quoniam bonus est quoniam in aeternum, misericordia eius.

The translation is as follows:

The eyes of all men wait upon thee, O Lord, for thou givest them their meat in due season. The heavens are thine, the earth also is thine, as for the world and the fullness thereof thou has founded them. O confess unto the Lord that he is good, that his mercy endureth for ever.

So be it [Amen]

=== Prefects ===
The School has a long history of appointing Prefects from its upper years of the school (Sixth Form), traditionally called Gladstone Scholars (After one of the founders of the school William Ewart Gladstone). These typically consist of the Heads of House, for each of the six houses of the college as well as the Head Boy and Head Girl who are the Heads of School.

=== Latin Oration ===
The Latin Oration is orally performed at the College's annual speech night by the Head Boy and Head Girl, on occasion with the inclusion of their Deputies. It is a Latin Speech performed from memory which typically summarises the events that took place in the college over the previous year.

=== Founders Day ===
The annual celebration of the Colleges founding takes place usually at noon on the first Friday of October, the Service is held in the Liverpool Anglican Cathedral, reflecting the Colleges long links with the Diocese of Liverpool. The service is religious and has many traditional aspects including the commemoration of the founders and benefactors, the procession of the Houses and the singing of the school song, as well as religious readings and prayers.

== Combined Cadet Force ==
Liverpool College has an active Combined Cadet Force (CCF) Contingent, comprising an Army Section, Royal Navy Section and Royal Air Force Section. The CCF has been a part of the college for over 150 years, with over 300 cadets within its ranks drawn from Years 9-13. The military training and skills the CCF teaches is delivered by volunteer staff and teachers in the School as well as Regular and Reserve Armed forces personnel.

Liverpool College CCF also offers The Duke of Edinburgh's Award from Bronze to Gold and sees a number of cadets successfully complete the awards every year.

== Sporting traditions ==
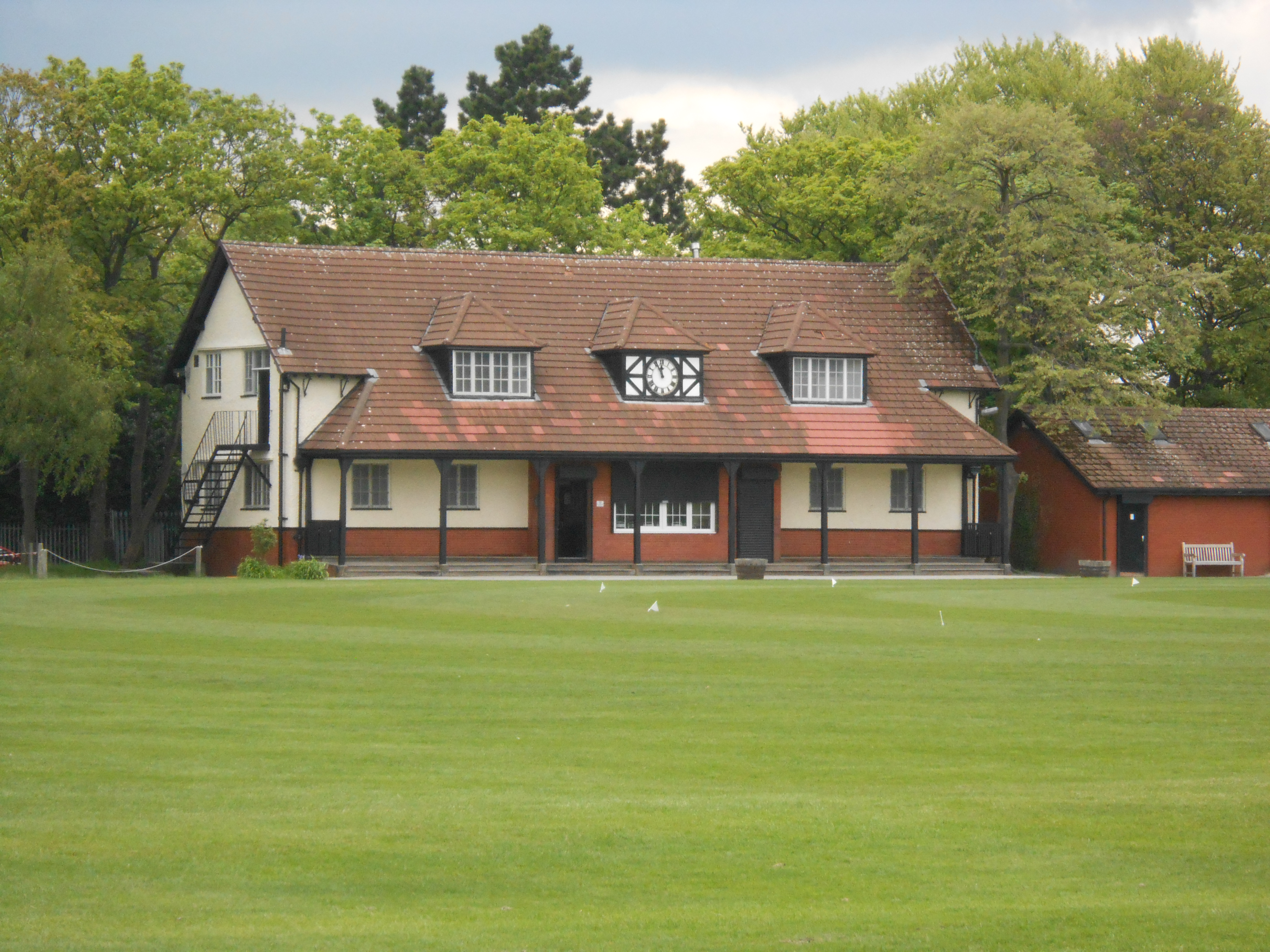
The College's Cranston Pavilion, Situated on the Sports Fields

There is a strong sporting tradition at the College and has had a number of Alumni go on to play in professional sporting leagues. The College successfully fields teams in a number of sports including Rugby, Hockey, Netball, Football Cricket and Athletics.

The College's Rugby 1 XV has competed annually against King Williams College in the Isle of Man for over 120 years with the first match between the two being played in 1903. It is one of the longest continuous school-boy rugby fixtures in the North of England. The current format consists of two legs with a match played in Liverpool and another in the Isle of Man, with the overall winning team being awarded the Mark Richard Wheeler Cup.

== Principals of Liverpool College ==
1. W. J. Conybeare 1840–1849
2. J. S. Howson 1849–1865
3. G. Butler 1865–1882
4. E. C. Selwyn 1882–1888
5. F. Dyson 1888–1900
6. J. B. Lancelot 1900–1917
7. H. Costley-White 1917–1919
8. R. Brook 1919–1928
9. R. W. Howard 1928–1945
10. R. G. Lunt 1945–1952
11. L. H. Collison 1952–1970
12. M. F. Robins 1970–1978
13. R. V. Haygarth 1979–1992
14. B. R. Martin 1992–1997
15. J. P. Siviter 1997–2000
16. J. D. B. Christian 2002–2007
17. J. B. v. Mourik Broekman 2008–2024
18. A. Haynes 2024–

== Notable alumni ==
=== Military honours ===
- Capt. Noel Chavasse VC & Bar, MC – British Army, Royal Army Medical Corps One of three people to have ever been awarded the Victoria Cross and Bar
- Lt. Col. Alfred Stowell Jones VC – British Army, awarded the Victoria Cross for services during the Indian Rebellion of 1857
- Cdre. Ronald Niel Stuart VC, DSO, RD –Royal Navy, Merchant navy, awarded the Victoria Cross during World War I
- Capt. Walter G. R. Hinchliffe DFC – Royal Naval Air Service, Royal Air Force, flying ace in World War I
- Lt. Gen. Sir Charles William Wilson – British Army, Director‑General of the Ordnance Survey and Director‑General of Military Education
- Brig. Derek Mills-Roberts CBE, DSO & Bar, MC – British Army, Commando Leader
- Sqn. Ldr. John Mungo-Park DFC & Bar – Royal Air Force, CO No. 74 Squadron, Battle of Britain Ace, K.I.A 1941
- Air Vce. Mshl. Harold Bird-Wilson CBE, DSO, DFC & Bar, AFC & Bar – Royal Air Force, Flying ace during WWII
- Flt. Lt. John Webster DFC – Royal Air Force, Battle of Britain flying ace, K.I.A in 1940

=== Legal and political ===
- Ellis William Davies – Liberal MP and Lawyer
- Sir William Francis Kyffin Taylor, Baron Maenan – Barrister and Judge
- Edward Russell, 2nd Baron Russell of Liverpool – Historian and lawyer
- John Stopford, Baron Stopford of Fallowfield – Peer
- David Hunt, Baron Hunt of Wirral – Conservative MP and Peer, Secretary of State for Wales
- Sir John Rigby – Liberal MP, Attorney General for England and Wales and Lord Justice of Appeal
- Sir Brian Leveson – Lord Justice of Appeal and Senior Presiding Judge for England and Wales
- William Pickford, 1st Baron Sterndale – Lord Justice of Appeal and Master of the Rolls
- Jake Berry – Conservative MP, Chairman of the Conservative Party
- Stephen McPartland – Conservative MP, Minister of State for Security
- Kit Malthouse – Conservative MP, Secretary of State for Education
- Sir Henry Globe – Recorder of Liverpool and High Court Judge
- Sir Andrew Edis – Lord Justice of Appeal
- Sir Arthur Forwood, 1st Baronet – Conservative MP, Merchant and Lord Mayor of Liverpool
- Sir Thomas Royden, 1st Baronet – Conservative MP, High Sheriff of Cheshire, Lord Mayor of Liverpool father of Baron Royden
- Sir William Bower Forwood – Lord Mayor of Liverpool, High Sheriff of Lancashire
- Herbert Neville Bewley – Lord Mayor of Liverpool, Lawyer.

=== Religious ===
- Rev. Christopher Chavasse – Lord Bishop of Rochester
- Rev. David Saunders-Davies – 2nd Lord Bishop of Stockport
- Rev. Charles Lisle Carr – 107th Lord Bishop of Hereford
- Rev. Nigel McCulloch – 11th Lord Bishop of Manchester
- Rev. Sir Robert Stopford – 33rd Lord Bishop of Peterborough and 128th Lord Bishop of London
- Rev. Sir Armitage Robinson – Dean of Westminster and later of Wells

=== Sports ===
- John Francis Ashby, English rugby player and member of the 1910 British Lions tour to Argentina
- Kenneth Cranston – Cricketer
- William Charles Cuff – Chairman of Everton F.C, Chairman Football League.
- Guy Edwards – F1 Driver – Queen's Award for Gallantry
- Abi Ekoku – Athlete and Rugby League player
- Efan Ekoku – Footballer
- John Houlding – Founder of Liverpool F.C
- Peter Johnson – First-class cricketer
- Curtis Robb – Olympian and Athlete
- Kenneth Siviter – First-class cricketer
- Nye Thomas – Rugby Union Player

=== The arts ===
- Katy Carmichael – Actress
- Bernard Falk – TV producer/presenter
- Deryck Guyler – Actor
- Sir Rex Harrison – Actor
- Stephen Jones – Milliner
- Richard Le Gallienne – Author, poet, publisher
- Frederick William Hayes – Painter, illustrator, novelist, and playwright
- Mathew Murphy – Musician
- Sir Simon Rattle – Conductor
- Sir Ken Robinson – Author
- Sir Richard Stilgoe – Entertainer/lyricist
- Ronald Symond – Author
- Elton Welsby – TV presenter
- Brian Epstein – Beatles manager

=== Other ===
- John Baker – Oxford academic, Lord Mayor of Oxford and father of Janet Young
- T. K. Bellis – Merchant, the "turtle king"
- Roger Bennett – Journalist, football pundit and TV Personality
- Brian Blackwell – murderer
- Sir John Esplen – Shipbuilder
- Robson Fisher – Headmaster
- Sir Richard Glazebrook – Physicist
- Richard Pendlebury (1847–1902) - mathematician, musician, bibliophile and mountaineer
- Sir Charles Petrie, 3rd Baronet – Historian and son of Liverpool Lord Mayor, Sir Charles Petrie
- Richard Smethurst – Oxford academic
- R. B. Whitehead – numismatist
- William Renner (surgeon) – cancer researcher and surgeon
- W. S. Thatcher – Cambridge academic and Censor of Fitzwilliam House
- Peter West (physicist) – theoretical physicist
- Gustav Wolff – co-founder & partner Harland & Wolff, Shipbuilders of RMS Titanic
