= T. K. Bellis =

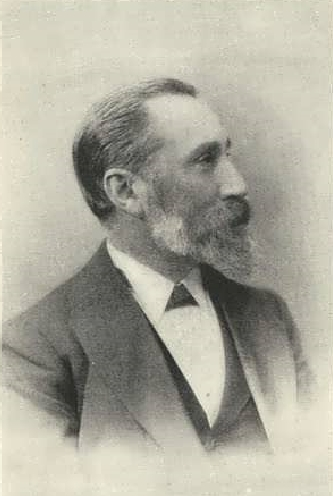
T.K. Bellis

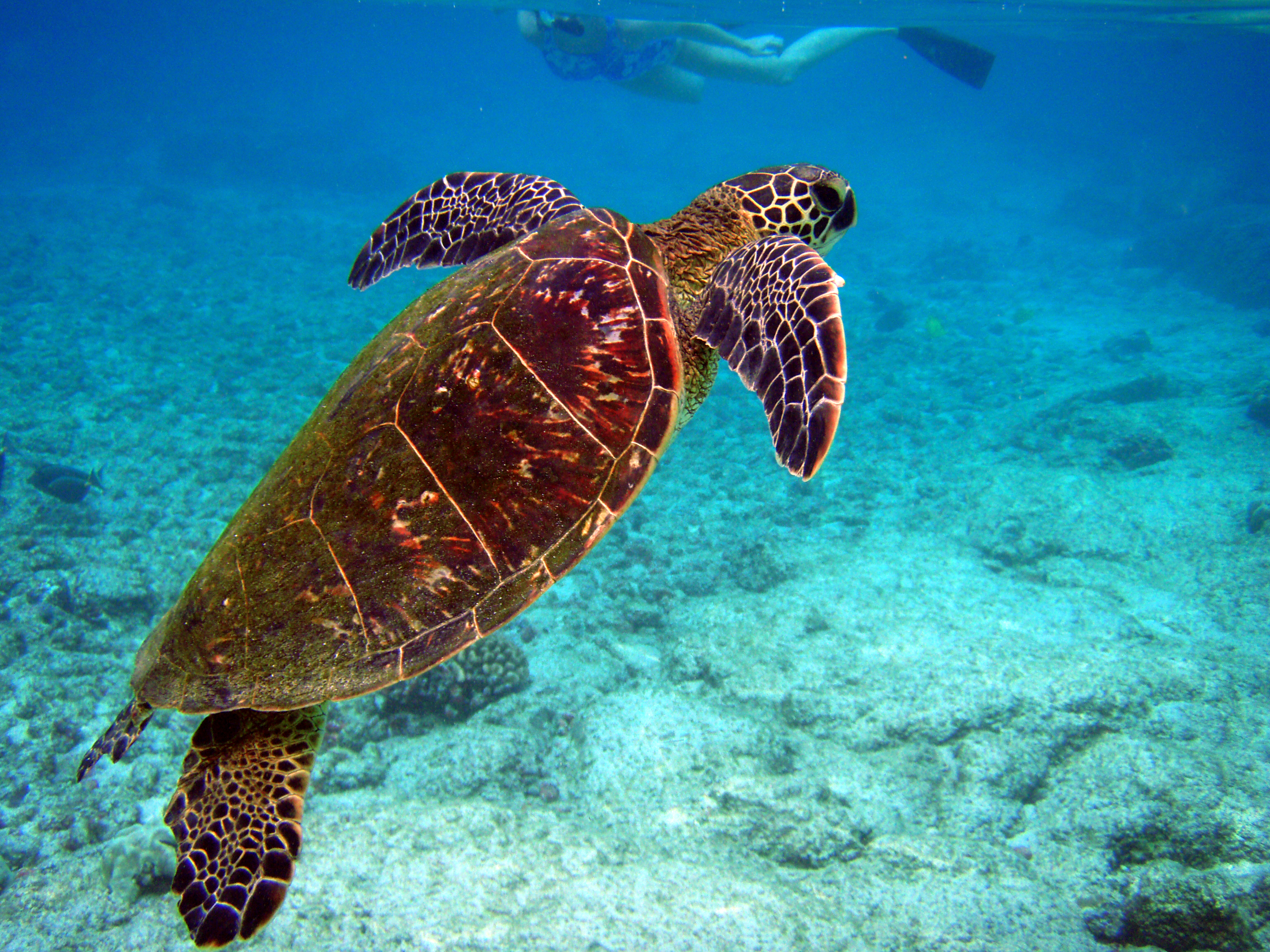
The chelonia mydas turtle

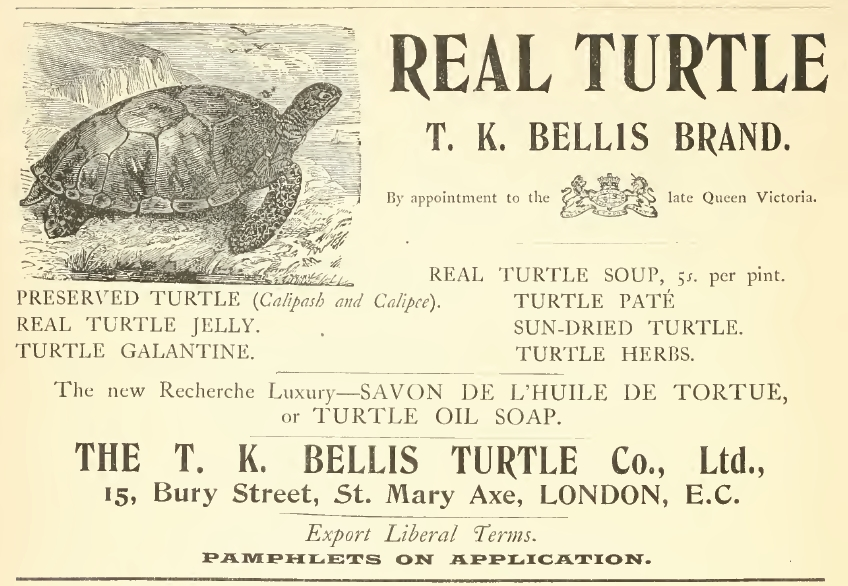
T.K. Bellis Turtle Co. advertising, 1905

Thomas Kerrison Bellis (5 February 1841 – 24 April 1929) was a British merchant and importer of turtles. Known as "The Turtle King", he established a thriving business in London at the end of the 19th century, producing turtle products that promised health benefits and were a staple of Victorian fine dining and civic banquets.

== Career ==
Bellis was born in Liverpool, and educated there at Liverpool College. He travelled to London to work in a West India house (West Indies merchants) as a young man. It was probably there that he learned about the turtle trade. He started his own business in the trade in 1874 and in 1882 won a silver medal for turtle products at the International Fisheries Exhibition. He created a niche for himself, so that by the end of the nineteenth century he had almost monopolised the trade in turtle products in Britain. His firm produced turtle soup and pate, turtle herbs, turtle oil soap, sun-dried turtle and various kinds of preserved turtle, and supplied Queen Victoria.

== Importing turtles ==
The turtles, which were only of the chelonia mydas species, were caught in the Gulf of Mexico and transported by schooner to Kingston, Jamaica, from where they were shipped to Britain by Royal Mail steamer. In 1898 approximately one hundred turtles were imported every two weeks, and they were kept alive if possible using salt-water hose and tanks on ship. However, many died during the journey, 105 out of 120 on one occasion. The cold was a particular problem. Each weighed over 100 pounds and up to 140 but heavier ones were not required as the meat was less tender. Originally, Bellis kept the survivors alive in his cellars until required, but later took to slaughtering them on arrival and processing the meat straight away.

In 1905, it was reported that there was not a single live turtle available anywhere in London, not even for a guinea an ounce (a great deal of money then). A quarrel had broken out between fishermen from Kingston and the Nicaraguan authorities, off whose coast the fishermen were accustomed to work. Kingston vessels had been seized, the men imprisoned by the Nicaraguans, and their catch set loose. Bellis, the "chief importer of turtles in Britain" advised that other boats would not venture out, however, a British gunboat would soon be going along to protect them, so there was hope that turtle would be available for the Lord Mayor's Banquet the following month, and that mock turtle soup would not have to be served.

The firm of T.K. Bellis Turtle Company Limited was liquidated in 1912. The firm of T.K. Bellis Turtle Co. (1911) Limited was liquidated in 1922.

== Publications ==
- Tables of the British Sugar Duties commencing May, 1873, etc. E. Marlborough & Company, 1873.
