= William Renner (surgeon) =

Sierra Leonian surgeon (1846–1917)

William Renner (c. 1846–1917), best known as W. Renner, was a Sierra Leonean surgeon and cancer researcher.

== Biography ==
Renner was born in Sierra Leone to an affluent Creole family. He studied at Liverpool College, University College London and in Dublin and Brussels. He qualified M.D. at the Free University of Brussels in 1881. He trained in London for an M.R.C.S. and obtained an Orphthalmic assistantship.

He practised medicine on the Gulf of Guinea, and from 1882 until his death was a surgeon in Sierra Leone, where he was consulting surgeon to all its hospitals. He worked as Assistant Colonial Surgeon.

In 1912, he changed his name to William Awoonor-Renner.

== Cancer research ==
Renner stated that there was an increasing number of cases of cancer of different organs, especially the breast among the descendants of the liberated Africans or Creoles of Sierra Leone, while cancer was rare among the aborigines of West Africa. According to Renner, cancer was rarely found among the hundreds of female aborigines who were treated every year at the Colonial Hospital, nor was it reported by medical officers in large towns at dispensaries where natives had been encouraged to attend for treatment.

He concluded that cancer was rare among the aborigines because of "their primitive mode of living", such as eating grains and vegetables, while the Creoles had adopted the habits of the European civilization, such as eating large quantities of butcher's meat. He reported his findings in a paper for The British Medical Journal in 1910.

John Randle disagreed with Renner's theory and stated that cancer was seen less frequently among aborigines in hospital because natives were superstitious and would instead have preferred to visit local country doctors. Randle also described cases of cancer he had encountered among the aborigines and concluded that "malignant diseases are not a rarity amongst the aborigines in any part of West Africa".

== Selected publications ==
- "The Spread Of Cancer Among The Descendants Of The Liberated Africans Or Creoles Of Sierra Leone" (The British Medical Journal, 1910)
