= Henry Globe =

British judge and barrister

The Honourable Mr Justice Globe

Judge of the High Court of Justice
- In office 2011 – 4 November 2017
- Appointed by: Queen Elizabeth II

Recorder of Liverpool
- In office 2003–2011
- Preceded by: David Clive Clarke
- Succeeded by: Clement Goldstone

Personal details
- Born: 18 June 1949 (age 77)
- Spouse: Estelle Levin (m. 1972)
- Children: Two
- Education: University of Birmingham

Sir Henry Brian Globe (born 18 June 1949), styled The Hon Mr Justice Globe, is a British judge and barrister. Since 2011, he has been a judge of the King's Bench in the High Court. From 2003 to 2011, he served as the Recorder of Liverpool.

== Early life and education ==
Henry Brian Globe was born on 18 June 1949 to Theodore Montague Globe and Irene Rita Globe.

He was educated at Liverpool College, then a private school in Liverpool, England. He studied law at the University of Birmingham and graduated with a Bachelor of Laws (LLB) degree.

== Legal career ==
On 20 July 1972, Globe was called to the Bar by the Middle Temple. He took silk in 1994 to become a Queen's Counsel. He was involved in legal practice in Liverpool for nearly 40 years.

=== Judiciary ===
In 2003, Globe was appointed a Senior Circuit Judge and the Recorder of Liverpool. On 3 October 2011, he was appointed a Judge of the High Court of Justice and assigned to the Queen's Bench Division. From 2013 to 2016, he was the Presiding Judge of the North East Circuit. Globe retired from the bench on 4 November 2017.

== Personal life ==
In 1972, Globe married Estelle Levin. Together, they have two daughters.

== Honours ==
In July 2013, Globe was appointed an honorary fellow of Liverpool John Moores University "for his outstanding contribution to the legal profession over the last 40 years, much of which has been spent in legal practice in and around Liverpool". In July 2015, he was awarded an honorary Doctor of Laws (LLD) degree by the University of Liverpool.

== See also ==
- List of High Court judges of England and Wales
