= Peter West (physicist) =

British supersymmetry scientist

Peter West FRS
- Born: 4 December 1951 (age 74); Bromley, Kent
- Education: Liverpool College
- Alma mater: Imperial College (BSc); Imperial College (PhD)
- Known for: Type IIA supergravity; Type IIB supergravity; Conformal supersymmetric quantum theory in four dimensions
- Awards: Chalmers 150th Anniversary Professor at the Chalmers Institute of Technology (1992) Fellow of the Royal Society (2006)
- Scientific career
- Fields: Supersymmetry; Supergravity; String theory
- Workplaces: King's College London
- Thesis: Studies in Supersymmetry (1976)
- Doctoral advisor: Abdus Salam

Peter Christopher West FRS, born on 4 December 1951, is a British theoretical physicist at King's College, London and a fellow of the Royal Society.

West was elected to the Royal Society in 2006; his citation read

Professor West is distinguished for the development of the theory of supersymmetry and its application to the construction of unified theories of all the fundamental particle interactions. His results have become cornerstones of the modern theory of superstrings and associated branes to which he continues to contribute actively.

Together with his collaborators, West was one of the first to construct both type IIA and type IIB supergravity. These theories combine supersymmetry with general relativity, and they encode many of the properties of strings and branes.

West created a research group working on supersymmetry and strings in the Mathematics Department at King's College London.

== Early life and education ==
Peter West completed his secondary school education at Liverpool College after which he obtained his BSc in physics at Imperial College, London in 1973 where he subsequently studied for his Ph.D. under the supervision of Abdus Salam until 1976. After postdoctoral positions at the École normale supérieure in Paris and then Imperial College London, he moved to King's College London in 1978. He has held short term positions at Stony Brook at The State University of New York, the California Institute of Technology, CERN, the Chalmers Institute of Technology in Goteborg and the Erwin Schrödinger International Institute for Mathematical Physics in Vienna.

== Works ==
Peter West is one of the pioneers of supersymmetry and its application to string theory. He discovered many of the quantum properties of supersymmetric theories in four dimensions including an early version of the supersymmetry nonrenormalization theorems and the superconformal invariance of large classes of supersymmetric quantum field theories, including the maximally supersymmetric N = 4 supersymmetric Yang–Mills theory, which has 16 supersymmetries, theories with 8 supersymmetries and 4 supersymmetries. The non-renormalization theorem plays a key role in determining how supersymmetry might be realised in nature and the above were the first discovered non-trivial conformal quantum field theories in four dimensions.

West constructed the two maximal supergravity theories that exist in ten dimensions; the IIA theory and, with Paul Howe and John Henry Schwarz, the IIB theory. These theories are the low energy effective actions, including non-perturbative effects, of the corresponding string theories and as a result they are one of the cornerstones in our understanding of string theory. Kellogg Stelle and West, and at the same time Sergio Ferrara and Peter van Nieuwenhuizen, found the supergravity theory in four dimensions which possesses an algebra with four supersymmetries which existed without the use of the equations of motion that is, they found the auxiliary fields that extended the first discovered supergravity theory. Using this off-shell formulation West and Stelle, together with the complementary work of Ferrara and van Nieuwenhuizen, introduced a tensor calculus for supergravity and this led to the construction of the most general supersymmetric theory in four dimensions, which has played a crucial role in the construction of realistic supersymmetric models.

West, together with Ali Chamseddine, formulated both ordinary gravity and supergravity as a Yang–Mills theory and so provided the first algebraic proof of the supersymmetric invariance of supergravity theories. The gauging approach of Chamseddine and West was different to the earlier ideas of gauging to find gravity that took the Poincaré transformations on Minkowski spacetime and made them local, that is, they took the translations to depend on spacetime. The gauging method of Chamseddine and West has been used to construct conformal supergravity theories and plays a key role in the formulation of higher spin theories.

André Neveu and West pioneered the development of gauge covariant string theory; including the free term and the general features of the interacting theory. A complete formulation of gauge covariant open string theory was found by Edward Witten.

More recently West has proposed that M-theory, the underlying theory of strings and branes, should have a very large Kac–Moody algebra, called E11, as a symmetry. He has shown that this theory contains all the maximal supergravity theories.

== Books ==
- Introduction to Supersymmetry and Supergravity, P. West (World Scientific Publishing, 1986) (an extended and revised second edition was published in 1990 by World Scientific Publishing, ISBN 981-02-0098-6)
- Introduction to Strings and Branes, P. West (Cambridge University Press, 2012)
