= Gordon Selwyn =

English Anglican priest and theologian

The Very Reverend Gordon Selwyn
- Dean of Winchester
- Church: Church of England
- Diocese: Diocese of Winchester
- In office: 1931 to 1958

Personal details
- Born: Edward Gordon Selwyn; 6 July 1885
- Died: 11 June 1959 (aged 73)
- Denomination: Anglicanism
- Spouse: Phyllis (m. 1910; died 1941) Barbara (m. 1942)
- Children: Eight

Edward Gordon Selwyn (6 July 1885 – 11 June 1959) was an English Anglican priest and theologian, who served as Warden of Radley College from 1913 to 1919; Rector of Red Hill, near Havant. He was Dean of Winchester from 1931 to 1958. He wrote sermons and other books and was the editor of the liberal Anglo-Catholic journal Theology during the first fourteen years of its existence, 1920–34.

== Early life ==
Selwyn was born on 6 July 1885 in Liverpool, the eldest son of the Rev. Edward Carus Selwyn, Headmaster of Uppingham School (died 1918), and his wife Lucy Ada, née Arnold. He had four brothers and two sisters. He was son-in-law to Sir Edwyn Hoskyns, bishop of Southwell. His mother died at the age of 36, leaving seven very young children. Gordon was only nine years old.

== Ecclesiastical life ==
Selwyn was educated at Eton College and King's College, Cambridge; he prepared for holy orders at Cuddesdon College before being ordained in 1909. He became a Fellow and Lecturer at Corpus Christi College, Cambridge, until 1913 when he became Warden of Radley College. Following his resignation from Radley in 1918 (prompted by controversial punishments), he was appointed Rector of Redhill near Havant.

In 1918–19, he spent 20 months as a Temporary Chaplain to the Forces (TCF). He had been interviewed in January 1918, and it was noted that he could preach extempore, ride and, unusually for a chaplain, could speak both French and German. He had to delay his appointment until April because of a hernia operation. He was sent to Italy, proving to be ‘Excellent Chaplain, has done very good work’, and later to Kiev. He was Mentioned in Despatches. An obituarist would write about his time as a TCF ‘... that service was more precious to him than any other distinction in life'

In 1931 Selwyn became Dean of Winchester, a post which he held until his retirement in 1958, his death following shortly after in 1959. During his long tenure he was noted as a distinguished scholar and preacher. His churchmanship was 'high' by the measure of his times, and he anonymously donated Eucharistic vestments to the cathedral before becoming dean.

He was responsible for founding the Pilgrims' School for the choristers of Winchester Cathedral and the Quiristers of Winchester College and was actively involved in the early years of St Swithun's School for Girls.

He created the 'Friends of Winchester Cathedral', the first body of that kind, and inaugurated many improvements to the cathedral's fabric and furnishings with an ambitious programme which included re-casting the bells, rebuilding the cathedral's 'Father Willis' organ and restoration of the Presbytery vault and roof bosses. Inspired by her work elsewhere, he commissioned the leading embroiderer Louisa Pesel, with Sybil Blunt, to create new fabric furnishings for the cathedral, which led to the setting up the Cathedral Broderers. The large number of embroideries depicted the history of Winchester Cathedral until 1936.

He also commissioned heating and the first permanent electric lighting for the cathedral, appointing the Winchester electrical firm run by Miss Jeanie Dicks to undertake much of the works in 1934.

The brass cross on the high altar at Winchester Cathedral was designed and made by leading silversmith Leslie Durbin, and was given to the cathedral in 1966 by the Friends of Winchester Cathedral in memory of Selwyn. It is made of many small brass crosses which catch the light symbolising the description of the dean as a many faceted man.

Selwyn was very keen to become a bishop. Like many contemporary bishops, he had a clerical background, a distinguished academic record and had published many books. Although supported by several archbishops for promotion, his candidature failed to impress prime ministers who were then responsible for making the final recommendation to the Crown. The problem centred on his perceived deficiencies in professional relationships, exemplified in correspondence between Archbishop Fisher and the Prime Minister regarding the vacancy at Bath & Wells in 1946. It was noted that Selwyn had outstanding ability but that there had not always been ‘harmony’ in the posts he had held. Thus, Selwyn was proposed for vacancies at Lincoln (1942 and 1946) Bath and Wells (1943 and 1945), Salisbury (1946), Gloucester (1946) and Hereford (1949) but he was never recommended by a Prime Minister.

== Family life ==
In 1910, Selwyn married Phyllis Eleanor Hoskyns, daughter of Rt Revd Sir Edwyn Hoskyns, the Bishop of Southwell. They had a daughter and three sons, Lucy, Edward, Christopher and Jasper. After Phyllis Selwyn died in 1941 as the result of an accident, he married a widow Mrs Barbara Williams (née Crow) in 1942. His son, Christopher Selwyn, a lieutenant in the 13th battalion of the Parachute Regiment, was killed on active service on 1945. Selwyn's step-daughter, Jane, married Sir Francis Portal. Her son, Sir Jonathan Portal, was a trustee of the Friends of Winchester Cathedral, his wife, Lady Louisa Portal, is a member of the cathedral council and their two sons were cathedral choristers.

Selwyn died on 11 June 1959 at Shawford near Winchester, he was aged 73.

== Works ==
Essays Catholic and Critical

- Essays Catholic and Critical; by members of the Anglican Communion; edited by Edward Gordon Selwyn. x, 452 p. London: S.P.C.K., 1926 Contributors: E. O. James, A. E. Taylor, A. E. J. Rawlinson, W. L. Knox, L. S. Thornton, E. C. Hoskyns, J. K. Mozley, E. J. Bicknell, K. E. Kirk, E. Milner-White, J. H. Thompson, N. P. Williams and W. Spens. (three editions: 1926, 1926 & 1929). "An influential volume of fifteen essays by a group of Anglo-Catholic scholars on leading themes of Christian belief, with special attention to the issues raised by recent Biblical studies and philosophy."--Oxford Dictionary of the Christian Church (1957) Selwyn's particular contribution, apart from his editorial role, involved an attempt to uphold the rationality of belief in the Incarnation without accompanying commitment to the dogma of the Virgin Birth.

Other works

- 1915: The Teaching of Christ: an attempt to appreciate the main lineaments of the teaching of Christ in their historical proportion. London: Longmans, Green
- 1919: First Christian Ideas; by Edward Carus Selwyn; edited, with an introductory memoir, by his eldest son. London: John Murray
- 1920: Theology: a monthly journal of historic Christianity (editor) (published bimonthly since 1976)
- 1923: The First Book of the Irenicum of John Forbes of Corse: a contribution to the theology of re-union; translated and edited with introduction, notes & appendices, by Edward Gordon Selwyn. Cambridge: University Press
- 1925: The Approach to Christianity. London: Longmans, Green
- 1934 The Story of Winchester Cathedral Raphael Tuck & Sons
- 1936: Thoughts on Worship & Prayer. London: Society for Promoting Christian Knowledge (based on four lectures given in 1935)
- 1937: History of Christian Thought: a volume of essays; edited by Edward Gordon Selwyn. London: Centenary Press
  - A Short History of Christian Thought: a volume of essays; 2nd ed., rev. London: Geoffrey Bles, 1949
- 1938: The White Horseman, and other sermons. London: S.P.C.K.
- 1940: The Epistle of Christian Courage: studies in the First Epistle of St. Peter. London: A. R. Mowbray
- 1946: The First Epistle of St. Peter: the Greek text; with introduction, notes and essays by Edward Gordon Selwyn. London: Macmillan

== Sources ==
- ‘SELWYN, Very Rev. Edward Gordon’, Who Was Who, A & C Black, 1920–2008; online edition, Oxford University Press, December 2007 Accessed 9 April 2012
- Christopher Hibbert: No Ordinary Place: Radley College and the Public School Tradition, 1997

Church of England titles
Preceded by Holden Hutton	Dean of Winchester; 1931–1958	Succeeded by Norman Sykes
