= Roy Haygarth =

- Born: Roy V. Haygarth; 1931; Cheshire, England
- Died: 2019 (aged 87–88); Devon, England
- Occupation: Headmaster

Roy V. Haygarth was a British school master who was headmaster of Saltus Grammar School, in Bermuda, and later principal of Liverpool College, in England.

Haygarth was born in Cheshire in 1931 and attended Ellesmere College before going on to study at Oxford University. He then went on to be an English teacher teaching at both Cranleigh School and Oundle School before moving to Bermuda, a British Overseas territory.

In Bermuda, Haygarth became headmaster of Saltus Grammar School in 1969, Haygarth was described as an innovator, introducing the senior year to the school which became an example for all other schools on the island, and also oversaw the expansion of the school site, including the introduction of the library. Haygarth's tenure as head master of the school also saw the school change from an all-white school to an integrated school. In 1979 Haygarth left the school, to move back to England in order for his children to sit the A-level which at the time was not offered on the island. The newly built Haygarth Gymnasium was named in his honour, and still stands today.

Haygarth went on to become the principal of Liverpool College in 1979, where he remained until his retirement from teaching in 1992. A building on the school site, the Haygarth Technology Centre, is named after him. Haygarth then went on to become head inspector of Public schools in England and finally retired in 2000.

He died shortly after Christmas, and his funeral was held on 14 January 2019.

Haygarth was married with four children; his daughter is Emma Knight OBE, chief executive of the National Governors Association.
