= Kenneth Siviter =

English cricketer

Personal information
- Full name: Kenneth Siviter
- Born: 10 December 1953 (age 72); Southport, Lancashire, England
- Batting: Right-handed
- Bowling: Right-arm fast-medium

Domestic team information
- Years: Team
- 1974–1977: Oxford University

Career statistics
Competition	First-class	List A
Matches	16	1
Runs scored	139	4
Batting average	7.31	–
100s/50s	–/–	–/–
Top score	26	4*
Balls bowled	1,810	66
Wickets	25	3
Bowling average	38.56	14.33
5 wickets in innings	–	–
10 wickets in match	–	–
Best bowling	4/67	3/43
Catches/stumpings	3/–	–/–
- Source: Cricinfo, 1 September 2019

Kenneth Siviter (born 10 December 1953) is an English former cricketer.

Siviter was born at Southport in December 1953. He was educated at Liverpool College, before going up to Keble College, Oxford. While studying at Oxford, he made his debut in first-class cricket for Oxford University against Warwickshire at Oxford in 1974. He played first-class cricket for Oxford until 1977, albeit intermittently, making sixteen appearances. Playing as a right-arm medium pace bowler, Siviter had a tendency to ball a proliferation of no-balls, which was a major contributing factor to his lack of appearances for Oxford. In his sixteen appearances for Oxford, he took 25 wickets at an average of 38.56, with best figures of 4 for 67. In addition to playing first-class cricket while at Oxford, he also made a single List A one-day appearance for the Combined Universities cricket team in the 1976 Benson & Hedges Cup against Surrey.
