= Edward Carus Selwyn =

Reverend Edward Carus Selwyn

Personal details
- Born: Edward Carus Selwyn; 25 November 1853
- Died: 8 November 1918 (aged 64)
- Denomination: Anglicanism
- Spouse: Lucy Ada Arnold (m. 1884; died 1894) Julia Maud Stuart Dunn (m. 1896)
- Children: Eight
- Education: King's College, Cambridge

Edward Carus Selwyn was an English theologian, Scholar and Headmaster who was as Principal of Liverpool College and later Headmaster of Uppingham School as well as being the Honorary Cannon of Peterbourgh.

== Personal life ==
Selwyn was born in Lee, Kent on the 25th November 1853, and was the eldest son of Rev. Edward John Selwyn and his wife Maria Sophia Hughes. He was educated at Eton College before going on to study at King's College, Cambridge.

He had seven children with his first wife Lucy Ada Arnold including his eldest son Edward Gordon Selwyn until her death in 1894, he then remarried to Julia Maud Stuart Dunn and had one child with her.

== Career as headmaster ==
In 1882, at the age of 28, Selwyn was appointed Principal of Liverpool College, an Independent school in Liverpool at the time. Selwyn was responsible for the Upper School's move from Shaw Street to Lodge Lane in the south of the city; this move would lead to the Middle and Lower schools that still remained in the building on Shaw Street going on to combine into the separate Liverpool Collegiate School in 1908.

After Liverpool College, Selwyn would go on to become Headmaster of Uppingham School (an Independent school in Uppingham, Rutland) during 1888–1907. During his tenure, the school would go through many transformations, including the introduction of the Schools Combined Cadet Force, the Introduction to the school playing Rugby union. as well as the construction of buildings and facilities still used by the school today.
