= Saltus Grammar School =

Location
- 108 St. John's Road; Pembroke Parish; Bermuda
- Coordinates: 32.29977189999999°N 64.78735670000003°W

Information
- Founded: 1880; 146 years ago
- Website: saltus.bm

Saltus Grammar School, founded in 1880, is an independent school in Pembroke Parish, Bermuda. It was a boys' school until 1992, when it became co-educational. It has two campuses, one for the Lower Primary (Foundation - Year 2) and one for the Upper Primary, Middle School and Secondary.

The school is a member of the US-based National Association of Independent Schools and also the Canadian Accredited Independent Schools.

The schools motto, displayed on its crest, is "Labor omnia vincit" meaning "Work conquers all".

== History ==
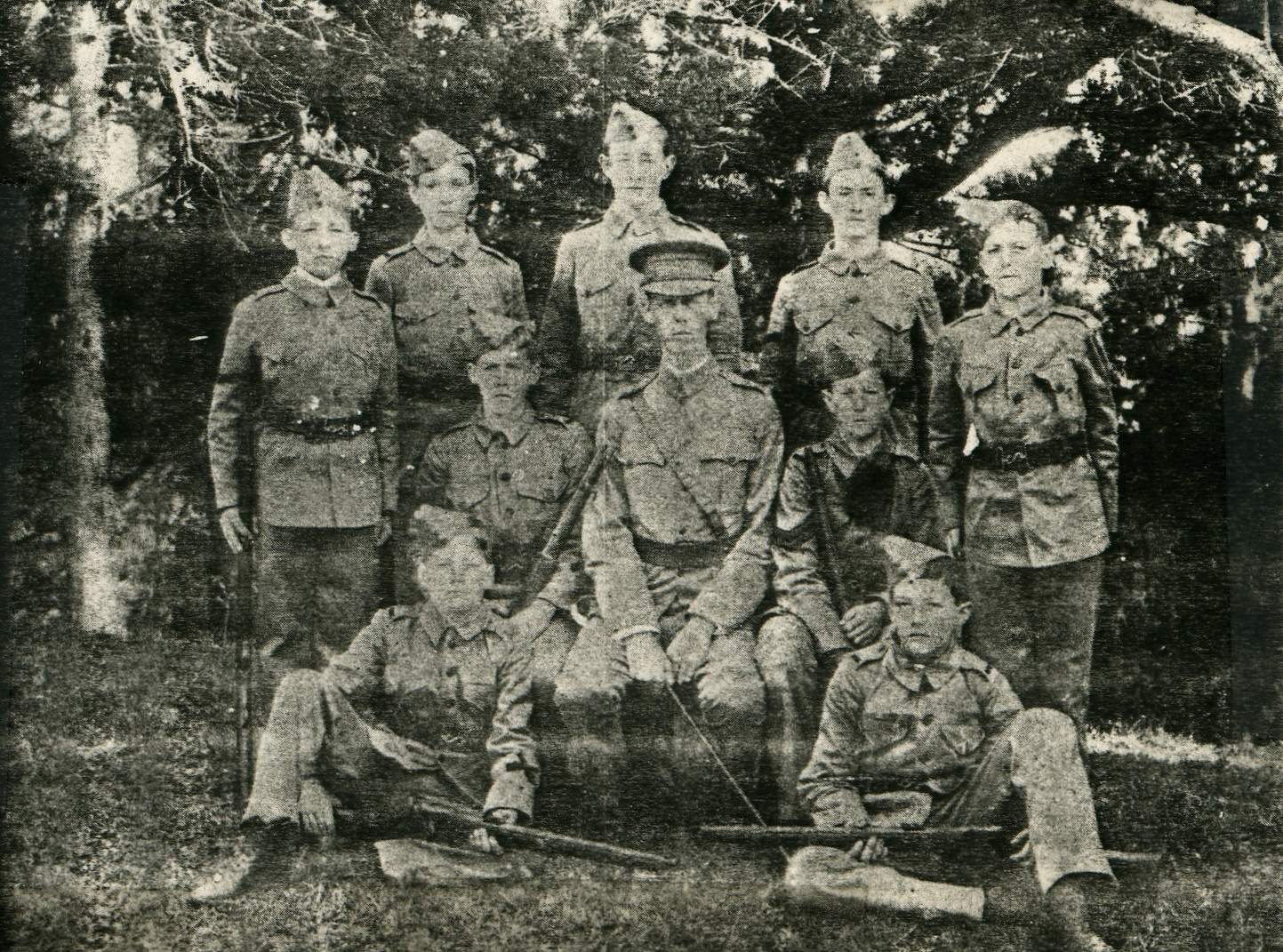
Saltus Grammar School

Samuel Saltus, after whom the school is named, was a descendant of Richard Norwood who first surveyed the Bermuda Islands in 1622. At his death in 1880 Saltus left a bequest in his will for the founding of a boys' school, but it was not until 6 February 1888 that Saltus Grammar School first opened its doors in the Pembroke Sunday School Building at the corner of North and Angle Streets in Hamilton, with thirty-five students enrolled.

In 1893, the School moved to "Woodlands," a historic house which still serves as the heart of the current main campus. The following decade saw modest improvements being made. Classrooms were added in 1923 to accommodate the increase in students, the veranda was added to the main building in 1953 and, by the middle 1960s, enrolment had reached 170. Up until this time the School had been grant aided, but in 1971 the Trustees made the major decision to have Saltus become a completely independent, fee-paying school.

To handle the larger numbers and the increasingly diverse curriculum, major additions were made to the campus to the Laboratory and Science Block in 1969 and the Cavendish-Preparatory Department in 1972 (under the headship of Roy Haygarth, 1969–79).

Saltus leased Cavendish Hall in 1972, thus establishing a second campus. Thanks to the generosity of the Cavendish Trustees, that school has now been incorporated into Saltus Grammar School.

Other major projects since then included: The Reiss Library (1975), The Haygarth Gymnasium (1979), and The Henry Hallett Art and Music Facility (1982). Also in 1982, land leased to the Bermuda Swimming Association enabled a 25-metre swimming pool to be constructed on the main campus with the School having use of the facility.

In 1990, the Trustees made the decision to extend co-education, previously only at Grade 12 level, throughout the School and, in September, 1991, eighty-nine girls joined 608 boys to commence a new era in the history of the School. At the same time, an extensive building programme was undertaken, adding a new block to Cavendish plus several additional classrooms at the main campus and including major reconstruction to the interior of "Woodlands."

Rebuilt in 1993, the new "Woodlands" centre now contains: administrative offices including the Headmaster's office, Upper Primary classrooms, an Art classroom and the Secondary Design Technology Department. This phase of construction was concluded in late 1993 when total enrolment stood at 780, including 156 girls. By this time, the teaching staff numbered 59, and the School was led by its 6th Headmaster in 106 years, Mr. James Keith McPhee.

In August 1995, Mr. R. Trevor Rowell joined the school as its next Headmaster and immediately launched a consultative School Development Plan with input from staff, parents, trustees and students.

In June, 1999, Mr. Nigel J. G. Kermode, then a twenty-two year veteran teacher at Saltus, became the School's 8th Headmaster. He sought to continue the pace of the School's advances whilst retaining both its high academic standards and its nurturing and caring atmosphere. During his tenure as Headmaster, Saltus developed a school-wide strategic plan that resulted in the development of a Foundation Year Programme at the Preparatory level, the establishing of a Centre for Learning and significant curricular developments and additions to the School's physical plant on both its campuses—the largest and most significant of these being The Francis "Goose" Gosling Centre on the main campus. Mr. Kermode retired in August 2009.

In summer 2009, Saltus recruited a new headmaster, Mr. E. G. Staunton from St. Andrew's College in Canada.

In July 2013 Mrs. Claire Charlemagne was appointed as Saltus’ 10th Head of School and first female Head following an extensive international search. Having formerly served at Saltus as Head of Modern Languages, Director of Studies and Deputy Head (Academics) for a period of eleven years, Mrs. Charlemagne worked to establish the ‘Saltus Teachers’ Academy’ with links to the National College for Teaching and Leadership (UK) and Nottingham Trent University, through which professional qualifications are offered to faculty both from Saltus and other island schools, fostering increased professional growth and collaboration.

In 2015, former Headmaster, Ted Staunton returned to Saltus to guide the board of trustees in selection of a next Head of School. This led to the appointment of Ms. Deryn Lavell, Bishop Strachan School in 2017.

== Notable Alum ==
The following are the notable alumni of Saltus Grammar School:

- Nick Dill, Bishop of Bermuda
- Michael Dunkley, Former Premier of Bermuda
- Arthur Motyer, playwright, educator and novelist.
- John Waddington, colonial administrator
