= Peter Johnson (cricketer, born 1926) =

English cricketer, Royal Navy officer, and colonial administrator

Personal information
- Full name: Peter Lovell Johnson
- Born: 22 August 1926; Huyton, Lancashire, England
- Died: 11 July 2017 (aged 90); Ross-on-Wye, Herefordshire, England
- Batting: Right-handed
- Bowling: Right-arm medium

Domestic team information
- Years: Team
- 1947: Cambridge University

Career statistics
Competition	First-class
Matches	2
Runs scored	61
Batting average	20.33
100s/50s	–/–
Top score	40
Catches/stumpings	1/–
- Source: Cricinfo, 16 March 2019

Peter Lovell Johnson (22 August 1926 – 11 July 2017) was an English first-class cricketer, Royal Navy officer and colonial administrator in Kenya Colony.

== Early life and first-class cricket ==
Johnson was born in the Liverpool suburb of Huyton, where he was educated in the city at Liverpool College. From Liverpool College he went up to Clare College, Cambridge. While at Cambridge, he made his debut in first-class cricket for Cambridge University against Middlesex at Fenner's in 1947. In what was his only appearance for Cambridge University, Johnson batted twice during the match, scoring 19 runs in the Cambridge first-innings before being dismissed by Rowland Shaddick, while in their second-innings he was dismissed for 40 runs by Jack Robertson. He served in the Royal Navy shortly after, gaining promotion to lieutenant in July 1948. He was placed on the Emergency List in September 1950, the same year he in which he played one first-class match for the Combined Services cricket team against Essex at Chelmsford. He batted once during the match, scoring 2 runs before being dismissed by Ken Preston.

== Colonial service in Kenya ==
Soon after, Johnson moved to Kenya Colony to serve in the colonial administration. He was appointed by the Governor of Kenya Colony, Sir Philip Mitchell, as a second class magistrate in Coast Province in February 1952. Seven months later in September, he was appointed as a District Officer in Embu. He served in this position until December 1955, when he was appointed as a magistrate in Naivasha. Just under three years later, in May 1958, he was appointed to be a District Commissioner in Nyanza Province, relinquishing the position in July of the same year. He was to later be appointed as a courts officer to the Provincial African Courts in Central Province, but this appointment was cancelled in April 1961. The following year in April 1962, he was appointed as the private secretary to the Governor of Kenya Colony, Sir Patrick Muir Renison, an appointment which lasted until May 1963.

He returned to England at some point after this, where he died at Ross-on-Wye in July 2017.
