= Mary Arden, Lady Arden of Heswall =

British former Supreme Court judge

The Right Honourable Lady Arden of Heswall DBE PC
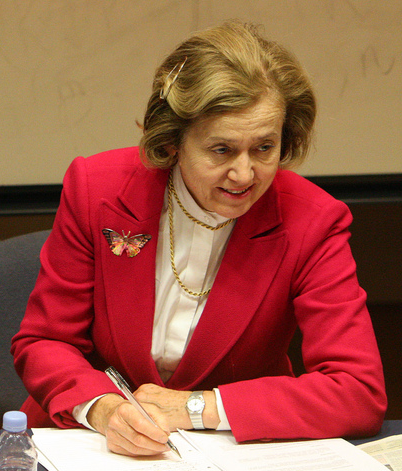
- Arden in November 2010

Justice of the Supreme Court of the United Kingdom
- In office 1 October 2018 – 24 January 2022
- Nominated by: David Gauke
- Appointed by: Elizabeth II
- Preceded by: The Lord Mance
- Succeeded by: Lord Richards of Camberwell

Lady Justice of Appeal
- In office 2000–2018

Justice of the High Court
- In office 1993–2000

Personal details
- Born: Mary Howarth Arden; 23 January 1947 (age 79) Liverpool, England
- Spouse: Lord Mance (m. 1973)
- Education: Huyton College
- Alma mater: Girton College, Cambridge; Harvard Law School

Mary Howarth Arden, Lady Arden of Heswall, DBE, PC (born 23 January 1947) is a former Justice of the Supreme Court of the United Kingdom. Before that, she was a judge of the Court of Appeal of England and Wales.

== Early life and education ==
Mary Howarth Arden was born in Liverpool, the daughter of Lieutenant-Colonel Eric Cuthbert Arden, of Heswall, Cheshire, a solicitor who had served with the Royal Garrison Artillery, and Mary Margaret (née Smith). Her grandfather was a partner in Gamon Arden and Co., a Liverpool firm of solicitors. Her father and brother, Roger, joined the family firm which merged with Hill Dickinson in 2007. She was brought up in south Liverpool and educated at Huyton College. She read law at Girton College, Cambridge, where she gained a starred first and an LLM, and an LLM degree at Harvard Law School in 1970 as a Kennedy Scholar.

== Career ==
She was called to the bar at Gray's Inn in 1971, and joined Lincoln's Inn in 1973. She practised at Erskine Chambers from 1971 to 1993, mainly in company law. She became a QC in 1986, and served as Attorney-General of the Duchy of Lancaster. She is an Honorary Fellow of Girton College, Cambridge, Royal Holloway, University of London, and of Liverpool John Moores University.

She was appointed to the High Court on 30 April 1993, becoming the first female High Court judge to be assigned to the Chancery Division. As is customary, she was appointed a Dame Commander of the Order of the British Empire (DBE) at the same time. Arden was chairman of the Law Commission from 1996 to 1999. On 2 October 2000, she was also appointed to the Court of Appeal.

Other posts held by Arden include her membership of the Steering Group of the Company Law Review, and a current post as Head of International Judicial Relations for England and Wales. She is a member of the advisory board, Centre of Commercial Law; of the Council of the Statute Law Society; of the Board of the Institute of Advanced Legal Studies, as well as being President of the Trinity Hall Law Society, and of the Association of Women Barristers. She is a member of the Permanent Court of Arbitration in the Hague.

Arden's appointment to the Supreme Court of the United Kingdom, replacing her husband Lord Mance on the court, was announced in June 2018, to take effect on 1 October 2018. On entering her office, she took the judicial courtesy title of Lady Arden of Heswall. She was the only woman out of the eleven judges of the court between the retirement of Lady Black of Derwent in January 2021 and the appointment of Lady Black's successor, Lady Rose of Colmworth, in April 2021.

By the time she retired in 2022, she was the eldest of the justices (Lord Lloyd-Jones was the second-eldest at 69). Following the retirement (and death) of Lord Kerr of Tonaghmore in 2020 she was the only remaining member to have held judicial office before 31 March 1995 and was thus allowed to retire at 75 instead of 70.

== Personal life ==
She married Jonathan Mance (now Lord Mance, former Deputy President of the Supreme Court of the United Kingdom) in the Lady Chapel at Liverpool Cathedral in 1973; they have three children.

Arden's husband, Lord Mance, joined the Queen's Bench Division in October 1993, making them the first married couple to sit on the High Court bench. The couple also became the first married couple both to sit on the Court of Appeal.

By virtue of her marriage, Arden is entitled to be styled The Lady Mance, but is instead known by her own judicial title.

== Honours ==
- She was appointed as a Queen's Counsel (QC) in 1986.
- She was appointed Dame Commander of the Order of the British Empire in the Civil Division on 30 April 1993 upon being made a High Court Judge. This gave her the right to be referred to as Dame Mary Arden.
- She was elected an Honorary Fellow of Girton College, Cambridge in 1995.
- She was appointed to the Court of Appeal on 2 October 2000. At this time She was appointed to the Privy Council of the United Kingdom. This gave her the honorific style "The Right Honourable" for life.
- She is an Honorary Fellow of Royal Holloway, University of London and Liverpool John Moores University.
- In 2002 she was awarded the honorary degree of Doctor of Laws (LLD) from the University of Nottingham.

== Judgments ==
Arden's judgments include:

- Hutchinson Personal Communications Ltd v. Hook Advertising Ltd - English contract law case, ruling that clients cannot take creative work pitched to them speculatively without a prior agreement.
- Price Meats v Barclays Bank
- Bankway Properties Ltd v Pensfold-Dunsford
- Pennington v Waine - English trusts law concerning the requirements for a trust to be properly constituted, and the operation of constructive trusts.
- Item Software (UK) Ltd v Fassihi and others
- Citibank v MBIA
- Collier v P & MJ Wright (Holdings) Ltd - English contract law concerning the doctrine of consideration and promissory estoppel in relation to "alteration promises".
- McCarthy v Secretary of State for the Home Department
- C (A Child) v XYZ CC
- R. (on the application of S) v Secretary of State for the Home Office
- Cooper v Attorney General
- Relfo Ltd v Varsani - English unjust enrichment law concerning to what extent enrichment of the defendant must be at the expense of the claimant.

== Bibliography ==
- with George Eccles, Companies Act, 1980 (1982)
- with Geoffrey Newton Lane, Rotaprint PLC: Investigation under Section 432 (2) and Section 442 of the Companies Act 1985 (1991)
- The Common Law in the Age of Human Rights (2000)
- Human Rights and European Law: Building New Legal Order (2015)

== Arms ==
Coat of arms of Mary Arden, Lady Arden of Heswall
Escutcheon Gules three crosses crosslet fitchy Or a chief Or the brissure of a woman in chief Gules. Motto Patientia Vinces
