= Investment Trust Companies (in liq) v HM Revenue and Customs =

Investment Trust Companies v HMRC
- Court: High Court
- Citation: [2012] EWHC 458 (Ch)

Keywords
- Expense of the claimant

Investment Trust Companies v HMRC [2012] EWHC 458 (Ch) is an English unjust enrichment law case, concerning to what extent enrichment of the defendant must be at the expense of the claimant.

== Facts ==
The Investment Trust Companies (ITC), closed-end investment trusts that got investment management services from management companies, sued to recover overpaid VAT from the HMRC. The managers usually got paid by fees plus VAT. It was thought that there was no exemption possible, and VAT was charged at a standard rate. But then, the ECJ said in 2007, the services should have been exempted from VAT since 1 January 1990. The litigation had begun in 2004, and at that point, the managers claimed VAT refunds from 2001 to 2004. The claims were not made for earlier accounting periods because the Value Added Tax Act 1994 section 80(4) installed a three year limitation period. HMRC repaid net amounts (because s 80(2A) required a set off from deductions of input tax already made for supplying services). After Fleming (t/a Bodycraft) v Customs and Excise Commissioners [2008] UKHL 2, more refund claims were allowed going back to 4 December 1996. ITC claimed they had a remedy for restitution, that this claim was not excluded by the VATA 1994 section 80(7), and that EU law gave an effective right to reimbursement.

== Judgment ==
Henderson J held that the HMRC was enriched by the full VAT amount at the expense of the ITCs. The unjust factor was the mistake of law that the VAT was due, and there was a causal link between the mistake, the payments and the Commissioners’ enrichment. But the claims were all barred by VATA 1994 section 80(7), whose purpose was a strict time limit. As end users of management services, ITC could have rights under EU law, following Danfoss and Reemtsma. There should be a direct remedy, but subject to limitation defences. These were San Giorgio claims, and there was no need to confine the claimant to Francovich v Italy damages.

== See also ==
- English unjust enrichment law
