= John Esplen =

English shipbuilder

Sir John Esplen Bt KBE
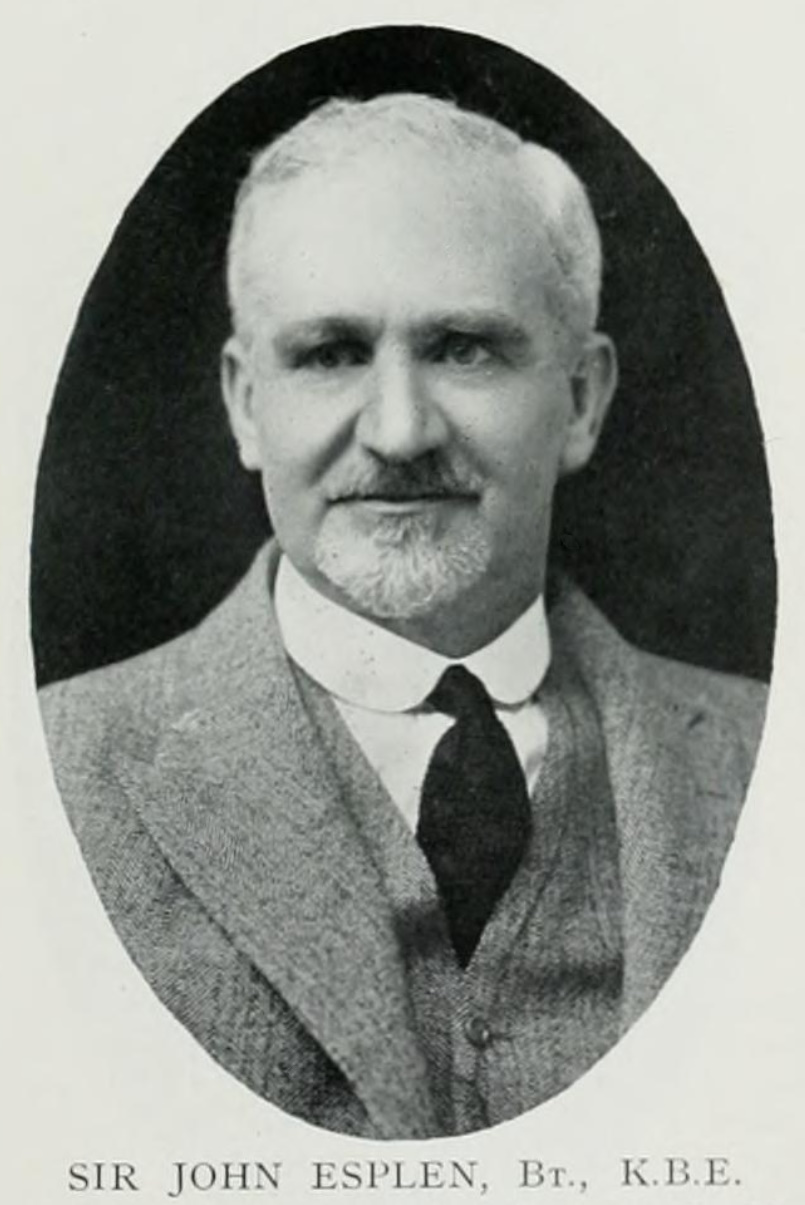
- Esplen in 1922.
- Born: 7 April 1863; Blundellsands, Lancashire, England
- Died: 7 February 1930 (aged 66); Kensington, London, England
- Occupation: Shipbuilder

Sir John Esplen, 1st Baronet, KBE (7 April 1863 – 7 February 1930) was an English shipbuilder.

== Early life and education ==
Esplen was born on 7 April 1863 at Blundellsands, near Liverpool, one of twelve children of William Esplen and Susannah (née Park). His father was a consulting engineer and naval architect.

Esplen received his early education at Liverpool College. He was apprenticed to the Liverpool engineering firm of Fawcett, Preston & Co Ltd and gained further experience with Earle's Shipbuilding and Engineering Company at Hull.

== Career ==
After he completed his training, Esplen joined his father's business of consulting engineers and naval architects. He later became a partner in the business and was instrumental in establishing branches of the firm at London, Cardiff, Buenos Aires, New York and Montevideo.

Esplen became chairman of Esplen & Sons Ltd of Liverpool, with branch offices worldwide, and Messrs Esplen, Son & Swainston Ltd of London. He also held directorships of about thirty other companies, mainly concerned with shipping and shipbuilding, often holding prominent positions on the boards.

During the First World War, he served as director of the Oversea Ship Purchase and Sale Department at the Ministry of Shipping, and continued as chief professional adviser into the 1920s.

== Honours ==
In 1918, Esplen was appointed Knight Commander of the Order of the British Empire (KBE) for his work for the Ministry of Shipping. In the June 1921 civil service honours, he was created a baronet, of Hardres Court in the County of Kent, with the letters patent issued on 14 July 1921.

== Personal life and death ==
Esplen married Laura Louise Dickenson on 26 January 1898. The couple had two children.

He died on 7 February 1930 at Kensington in London, after a long illness. He left an estate valued at £38,551. Lady Esplen died on 28 July 1936 at Leyburn in Yorkshire.

== Arms ==
Coat of arms of John Esplen

Crest
Upon two spears in saltire Argent headed Gules a bee volant Or.
Escutcheon
Per chevron Sable and Argent in chief two spearheads of the second and in base a lymphad of the first.
Supporters
Dexter a dragon Gules gorged with a collar Argent charged with a spearhead Sable, sinister a seahorse Argent maned finned and tufted Or gorged with a colalr Sable charged with a spearhead Argent.
Motto
Animo Et Fidi

Baronetage of the United Kingdom
New creation	Baronet (of Hardres Court); 1921–1930	Succeeded by William Esplen
