= Brian Blackwell =

British killer (born 1986)

- Born: 1986 (age 39–40); West Lancashire, UK
- Known for: Teenager who stabbed and beat his parents to death
- Status: Released
- Conviction: Manslaughter (29 June 2005)
- Criminal charges: Murder, 2 counts
- Penalty: Life sentence

Details
- Victims: Brian snr and Jacqueline Blackwell
- Date: 25 July 2004
- Locations: At their home in Melling, Merseyside, England

Brian Mark Blackwell (born 1986) is a British man who, aged 18 years old, killed his parents by stabbing them with a carving knife and beating them with a claw hammer in their home near Liverpool, England on 25 July 2004.

Although his trial judge said that it would "unlikely ever" be safe enough to free him, Blackwell was granted release on parole in 2016.

== Early life ==
Brian Mark Blackwell was born in 1986 in West Lancashire to Jacqueline Blackwell, a former antiques dealer, and Sydney Blackwell, a retired accountant known as "Big Brain". Until July 2004, Blackwell lived at home with his parents in Melling, Merseyside, an affluent village in the northern suburbs of Liverpool, England. It is believed that his parents were overindulgent, as well as excessively overprotective and controlling of even minor aspects of Blackwell's life throughout his childhood. He had been an under-18 tennis champion at the local club. Nicknamed "Little Brian" by his parents and "Brains" by his friends, he was described as an "exemplary student" with a scholarship to Liverpool College and was planning to begin studying medicine at the University of Nottingham in the autumn of 2004.

He regularly told innocuous lies, such as embellishing his academic achievements, but his lying escalated in the two months leading up to killing his parents in July 2004. He applied for 13 credit cards in his father's name and attempted to obtain a cash advance from the bank by falsely claiming to be a professional tennis player who needed the money to play in the French Open later that summer. He wrote on his application form that he'd be able to repay the loan with his fabricated salary of £45,000 a year. His girlfriend at the time believed he was a professional tennis player with a sponsorship from Nike and that he had a £60,000 Mercedes and a £450,000 flat in the same complex where footballer Steven Gerrard lived. With the savings bond that his parents had intended for university, he bought his girlfriend expensive gifts, and "hired" her as his manager, writing her a cheque for £39,000 that bounced. When his mother found out about the lies he told to the bank and the large withdrawals he had made, she contacted the bank manager.

== Killings ==
On 25 July 2004, Blackwell killed his parents in their home by bludgeoning them with a claw hammer and stabbing them repeatedly with a carving knife. He told the Liverpool Crown Court at his 2005 trial that he became enraged when his parents expressed concern about his extravagant spending and tried to stop him from traveling to the US with his then-girlfriend.

The next day, Blackwell and his girlfriend, who was unaware of the violent crime Blackwell had just committed, went on a lavish holiday to the United States as originally planned. Upon returning to Liverpool in mid-August, Blackwell stayed at his girlfriend's house for the next couple of weeks under the pretence that he was locked out of his parents' house while they were on holiday in Spain.

== Investigation and prosecution ==
On 5 September 2004, six weeks after they were killed, police discovered the decomposing bodies of Blackwell's parents after a neighbour called to report a strong, unusual odour coming from the property. The decomposition of the bodies from the attacks was so advanced that investigators initially thought they had died from gun shot wounds. Blackwell was arrested the following day and charged with two counts of murder. He denied the charges during initial interviews and hearings and was remanded into custody without bail until trial.

During an interview, Blackwell claimed he knew nothing of his parents' deaths and was on holiday when they were killed. After two days of questioning, Blackwell's story began to change. He confessed to the killings and claimed that he had acted in self-defence. According to Blackwell, he was holding a claw hammer for hanging a picture on the wall when his father stood up to hit him. Investigators had previously learned that Blackwell's father had been struck on the back of the head while sitting down, which conflicted with Blackwell's claim of self-defence. Afterwards, according to Blackwell, his mother came in, and he attacked her.

The double-murder charge was dropped after he pleaded guilty to the lesser charge of manslaughter on the grounds of diminished responsibility after experts diagnosed him with narcissistic personality disorder. Blackwell was sentenced to life imprisonment on 29 June 2005. According to The Guardian, Blackwell could have theoretically been eligible for parole after serving just over five and half years if a psychiatrist decided he was "fit for release", but the judge stated that "present evidence suggests that that conclusion is unlikely ever to be reached.".

In 2007, it was reported that Blackwell was imprisoned at Swinfen Hall Young Offenders Institution.

== Release ==
In 2016, after an oral parole hearing, the parole board granted Blackwell's release.

== See also ==
- Louise Porton, British woman who killed her two children in 2018
- Jean-Claude Romand
- Egomania, a TV documentary featuring a reenactment of the Brian Blackwell murder.
- Times article reporting the outcome of the trial
