= Huyton College =

Former independent day and boarding school in Liverpool

Liverpool College for Girls, Huyton

Information
- Other name: Huyton College
- Motto: Fideliter fortiter feliciter (Faithful, happy, brave)
- Established: 1894
- Status: Merged with Boys school Liverpool College
- Closed: 27 July 1993 (date of merger)
- Affiliation: Liverpool College

Huyton College or Liverpool College for Girls, Huyton, as it was also known, was an independent day and boarding school for girls founded in England in 1894 as the sister school to Liverpool College with which it merged on 27 July 1993, a few months short of its 100th birthday. The Liverpool College for Girls, Huyton, as it was originally known, was started in 1894 and intended to be parallel to the Liverpool College Boys School. It catered for girls between the ages of 4 and 18. In its early days, and towards the end of its time based at Huyton Hall before the merger, it also took day boys up to the age of seven. The school is mentioned in the book The Wildcats of St Trinian's by Frank Launder.

== School buildings and grounds ==
The main school administration was based in Huyton Hall with some classrooms in the adjoining building, which was called Fernwood. Huyton Hall and Fernwood had previously owned by a member of the Beecham family. Within the grounds there were extensive gardens, playing fields set up as lacrosse pitches, a large sports hall, tennis and netball courts, a cricket pitch, a swimming pool, extensive laboratories, an art room with kiln, an extensive music suite with practice rooms, a domestic science kitchen, needlework room, secretarial training suite, school bookshop and a large sanatorium. The Orchard was the main access road through the grounds, which was a public right of way and which effectively divided the school site into two. The headmistress lived on site in Greenhill, a house originally inhabited by Lord and Lady Cozens-Hardy. Some other members of staff lived on site from time to time.

The main school buildings were predominantly mid-Victorian converted domestic homes. Large building programmes had taken place in the 1930s, 1960s and 1980s to extend the school. The school buildings and grounds have now been redeveloped into private residential housing. The four main boarding houses are now residential homes for the elderly.

== Boarding ==
At the time of its closure, the main boarding house names were St Hilda's (named after Hilda of Whitby), St Mary's (named after the mother of Christ), St Margaret's (named after the devout Scottish queen), and St Clare's (named after the founder of the religious order of the Poor Clares). Previously there had also been other boarding houses, including St. Joan's, St Bride's and the houses for prep school pupils, St Anne's (boarding) and St Catherine's (main preparatory school teaching building). During the mid-20th century there was a further boarding house outside the school compound, at the bottom of the hill, called St Helena's, where, whenever possible, children whose parents lived abroad were housed, so that they felt they were 'going home' at the end of the school day. Sixth formers were housed at The Grange. In the last 20 years or so of the school's presence in Huyton, day girls had access to the boarding houses and their common rooms during their lunch hours, so they could feel fully part of the extended school community. Boarding houses were staffed by a housemistress and a relief housemistress who would provide cover during the main housemistress's 24-hour period off each week. By the late 1970s, approximately 25 boarders belonged to each boarding house, although they did their homework in the main school building and took their meals in the main school dining room in Huyton Hall and at Fernwood.

== Uniform ==
In the early days of the school, girls wore long dark skirts and white blouses. By the 1960s, the school uniform was divided into two seasons, winter and summer. It was available from George Henry Lee, a branch of John Lewis based in Liverpool. The winter attire was a blue Harris tweed coat, and skirt specially woven for the school in Scotland, and nylon, later cotton, sky blue blouse, a navy tie and a Navy blue wool sweater. A felt 'pudding bowl' hat was also worn in the winter. A black full length wool cloak with a cowl hood lined in felt with individual house colours was also part of the uniform (red for St Hilda's, yellow for St Margaret's, green for St. Mary's and blue for St. Clare's), worn by both boarders and day girls to keep them warm whilst running back and forth from houses. The summer uniform was a black wool blazer, cotton Calpreta print dress (again in house colours) and a straw boater with blue trim.

== School chapel and choir ==
The centre of spiritual life in the school was the chapel, with its Royal School of Church Music registered choir. Canon Donald Gray was the School Chaplain in the 1970s and early 1980s; he became the Rector of Liverpool and then Chaplain of the House of Commons, Rector of St Margaret's, Westminster and Chaplain to the Queen, and was well known in the Church of England for leading the 1980s rewrite of the Order of Communion service, amongst others. The school chapel was used on a daily basis for both morning prayer and until the late 1970s, evensong (for the boarders), as well as Sunday services, baptisms and confirmations, and choral concerts. The chapel choir recorded albums in the late 1970s and late 1980s, and appeared on television during the semi-finals of the National School Choir Competition in 1983.

== World War II evacuation ==
During the Second World War, the girls were relocated to Blackwell House in the Lake District.

== Merger with the boys school ==
On 27 July 1993, Huyton College merged with the Boys school Liverpool College forming the co-ed student base that Liverpool College has in the present day. Alumni from the two colleges attend joint alumni events linked with Liverpool College.

== Notable Old Huytonians ==
- Mary Arden (b. 1947), Lady Justice of the United Kingdom Supreme Court
- Andrea Boardman (b. 1968), TV presenter
- Barbara Pym (1913–1980), Novelist
- Deryn Rees-Jones (b. 1968) Poet
