= Recorder of Liverpool =

Ancient legal office

The Recorder of Liverpool or, since 1971, the Honorary Recorder of Liverpool is an ancient legal office in the City of Liverpool, England. The recorder is appointed by the Council, by virtue of section 54 of the Courts Act 1971. The recorder of Liverpool is customarily also a senior circuit judge of the Liverpool Crown Court in the North West Circuit, although the City may choose to appoint any duly qualified Judge to the role. They are addressed in court as "My Lord" or "My Lady", if also a senior circuit judge.

== List of recorders of Liverpool ==
- Hugh Bretherton (by 1438)
- Alexander Rughleye (about 1525–1541)
- Edward Halsall (by 1565 – after 1578)
- Sir Thomas Hesketh
- Leonard Chorley (by 1601; died 1608)
- Edward Halsall
- Thomas Molyneux (1612/3–1634)
- Hugh Rigby (1634–)
- William Langton
- John Lightbourne (to 1662)
- John Entwisle (1662–1709)
- Bertin Entwisle (1709–1722)
- Owen Salusbury Brereton (1742–1798)
- Francis Hargrave (1798–c1806)
- James Clarke (c.1815-1844)
- Gilbert Henderson (1844–c.1855) (died 1861)
- John Bridge Aspinall (1862–1886)
- Charles Henry Hopwood (1886–1904)
- Sir William Pickford, 1st Baron Sterndale

(1904–1907)

- Henry Gordon Shee (1907–1909)
- Edward Hemmerde (1909–1948)
- Sir William Gorman (1948–1950)
- Harry Ince Nelson (1950–1954)
- Graham Rogers (1954–1956)
- Neville Laski (1956–1963)
- Sir Stephen Chapman (1963–1966)
- Sir William Gerard Morris (1966–1967)
- Sir Ralph Kilner Brown (1967–1969)
- Sir Rudolph Lyons (1970–1971)

=== Honorary recorders of Liverpool ===
- Sir Rudolph Lyons (1972–1977)
- Sir Ernest Sanderson Temple (1978–1991)
- William Rayley Wickham (1992–1997)
- Sir David Clive Clarke (1997–2003)
- Sir Henry Globe (2003–2011)
- Clement Goldstone (3 October 2011 to 8 April 2019)
- Andrew Menary, KC (9 April 2019 – present)

== Sources ==
- Stewart-Brown, R. (1909). "An Account of The Oil Painting 'Liverpool in 1680' with Notes on The Peters Family of Platbridge and Liverpool". Transactions of the Historic Society of Lancashire and Cheshire. 60: 35–71.
