= Esplen baronets =

Title in the Baronetage of the United Kingdom

The Esplen Baronetcy, of Hardres Court in Canterbury in the County of Kent, is a title in the Baronetage of the United Kingdom. It was created on 14 July 1921 for Sir John Esplen, KBE. He was a Senior Director of Esplen, Sons and Swainston, consulting engineers and naval architects, and served as Chief Technical Adviser to the Ministry of Shipping during the First World War.

== Esplen baronets, of Hardres Court (1921) ==
- Sir John Esplen, 1st Baronet (1863–1930)
- Sir William Graham Esplen, 2nd Baronet (1899–1989)
- Sir John Graham Esplen, 3rd Baronet (1932–2016)
- Sir William John Harry Esplen, 4th Baronet (born 1967)

The heir apparent is Frederick William Harry Esplen (born 2001), only son of the 4th Baronet

== Arms ==
Coat of arms of Esplen baronets

Crest
Upon two spears in saltire Argent headed Gules a bee volant Or.
Escutcheon
Per chevron Sable and Argent in chief two spearheads of the second and in base a lymphad of the first.
Supporters
Dexter a dragon Gules gorged with a collar Argent charged with a spearhead Sable, sinister a seahorse Argent maned finned and tufted Or gorged with a colalr Sable charged with a spearhead Argent.
Motto
Animo Et Fidi
