= Henry Egerton Cotton =

British Army officer (1929–1993)

Henry Egerton Cotton JP DL
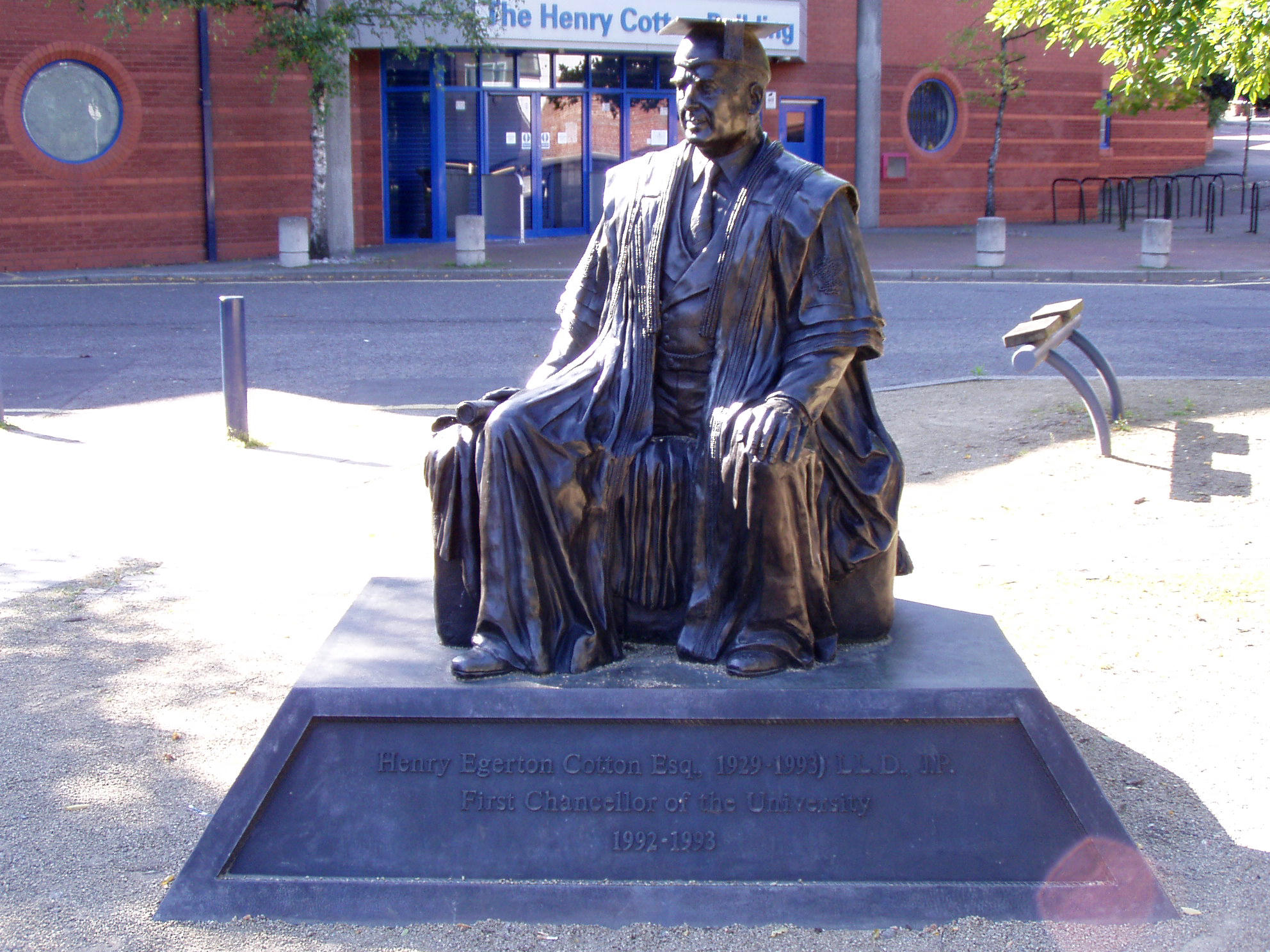
- Statue of Henry E. Cotton

1st Chancellor of Liverpool John Moores University
- In office 1992–1993
- Succeeded by: John Moores, Jr
- Vice-Chancellor: Peter Toyne

Lord Lieutenant of Merseyside
- In office 5 June 1989 – 1993
- Preceded by: Sir Kenneth Stoddart
- Succeeded by: Sir Alan William Waterworth

Personal details
- Born: 21 July 1929
- Died: 1993
- Spouse(s): Elizabeth Margaret Susan Peard (m. 18 June 1955)
- Relations: Colonel Vere Egerton Cotton (father); Elfreda Helen Moore (mother)
- Children: 1 daughter, 1 son
- Education: Magdalene College, University of Cambridge

Henry Egerton Cotton JP DL (21 July 1929 – 1993), (also known as Henry E. Cotton) served as Lord Lieutenant of Merseyside from 1989 to 1993. He was also the First Chancellor of Liverpool John Moores University, serving in office from 1992 until his death in 1993.

== Personal life ==
Henry Cotton was the son of Colonel Vere Egerton Cotton and his wife Elfreda (née Moore). On 18 June 1955, he married Elizabeth Peard, daughter of Clifford James Peard, DSO, JP. They had one daughter, Catherine and one son, Timothy.

=== Education ===
He was educated at Rugby School, Rugby, Warwickshire, and later graduated from Magdalene College, Cambridge, in 1952 with a B.A. degree. Henry Cotton was also in the Royal Artillery (Territorial Army) where he gained the rank of Lieutenant.

== University Chancellery ==
In 1992, Henry Cotton was appointed the First Chancellor of Liverpool John Moores University after it gained university status from being a polytechnic. The institution however goes as far back as 1823 to its foundation as the Liverpool Mechanics' School of Arts, entitling it to make a claim in the third-oldest university in England debate. He served in office until his death in 1993. He was succeeded by John Moores, Jr, CBE who was the son of Sir John Moores after whom the university is named.

A statue of Henry Cotton inscribed "Henry Egerton Cotton Esq, (1929-1993) LL.D, JP, First Chancellor of the University, 1992-1993" has been erected outside the Henry Cotton Building named in his honour, on the university's City Campus in Liverpool.

Honorary titles
Preceded by Sir Kenneth Stoddart	Lord Lieutenant of Merseyside; 1989–1992	Succeeded by Sir Alan Waterworth
Academic offices
Preceded by N/A	Chancellor of Liverpool John Moores University; 1992–1993	Succeeded by John Moores, Jr.
