= Peter Toyne (academic administrator) =

University vice-chancellor

Peter Toyne CBE, DL

High Sheriff of Merseyside
- In office 2001–2002
- Preceded by: William David Fulton, JP, DL

1st Vice-Chancellor of Liverpool John Moores University
- In office 1992–2000
- Chancellor: Henry E. Cotton, Esq; John Moores, CBE; Cherie Blair, QC
- Succeeded by: Prof. Michael Brown, CBE

Personal details
- Born: 3 December 1939 (age 86) Sheffield, England
- Spouse(s): Angela Toyne, JP
- Children: 1 son
- Education: University of Bristol

Peter Toyne, CBE DL, (b. 1939) was the First Vice-Chancellor and Chief Executive of Liverpool John Moores University. He served in these roles from 1992 until 2000.

== Early life and education ==
Toyne was born in 1939, near Rotherham. He was educated at Ripon Grammar School, where he became head boy and sang in the cathedral choir. Later he attended the University of Bristol where he studied geography.

== Career ==
Peter Toyne was a senior lecturer in geography at the University of Exeter before deciding to leave in 1978 in order to become head of Bishop Otter College, Chichester, and then later becoming Rector of North East London Polytechnic (now: University of East London).

In 1986, he left South England for Liverpool, where he became the founding Vice-Chancellor of Liverpool John Moores University. At the time of his moving to Liverpool, the city was at its lowest; however, Toyne became involved with the city, including taking an interest in the Liverpool Anglican Cathedral where he became a council member and Life President of the Liverpool Organists Association, President of the Liverpool YMCA, Chairman of the Royal Liverpool Philharmonic Society and Honorary Colonel of 33 Signal TA Regiment. Toyne later helped to co-author and chair Liverpool's bid for the 2008 European Capital of Culture.

Between 2001 and 2002, Toyne served as the High Sheriff of Merseyside. He was made a CBE for his work in regenerating Liverpool, and in 2010 was awarded freedom of the city by the council.

Academic offices
| Preceded by N/A | Vice-Chancellor of Liverpool John Moores University; 1992–2000 | Succeeded by Michael Brown |
