= Waterworth =

Waterworth is a surname. Notable people with the surname include:

- Alan William Waterworth (1931–2016), Lord Lieutenant of Merseyside
- Andrew Waterworth (born 1986), Northern Ireland footballer
- Edith Alice Waterworth (1873–1957), Australian welfare worker
- James Waterworth (1806–1876), English Catholic missionary priest
- Luke Waterworth (born 1996), Rugby League footballer
- Peter Waterworth (born 1957), British barrister and diplomat
