= Michael Brown (physicist) =

British physicist (born 1946)

Michael A. Brown CBE DL

2nd Vice-Chancellor of Liverpool John Moores University
- In office 2000–2011
- Succeeded by: Nigel Weatherill
- Chancellor: Cherie Blair, QC; Brian May, CBE

Personal details
- Born: 19 May 1946 (age 80) Hereford, England
- Spouse: Andrea Kathleen
- Children: Steve Christopher and Sally Melissa

Michael A. Brown, CBE, DL, FInstP, FIET, FRSA, (born 19 May 1946) was the 2nd Vice-Chancellor of Liverpool John Moores University in Liverpool, England, United Kingdom between 2000 and 2011.

== Education ==
He attended Bridgend Grammar School for Boys. In 1971, he obtained his PhD at the University of Nottingham with a thesis entitled Investigation of Phonon Scattering and Cross-relaxation by Paramagnetic Ions Using Thermal Conductivity Techniques.

== 100th Roscoe Lecture ==
In May 2011, Michael Brown delivered the 100th lecture of the Liverpool John Moores University Roscoe Lectures at the Liverpool Philharmonic Hall, as named after by William Roscoe.

Academic offices
Preceded by Peter Toyne	Vice-Chancellor of Liverpool John Moores University; 2001–2011	Succeeded by Nigel Weatherill
