= Claire House Children's Hospice =

Children's hospice in Merseyside, England

- Formation: 1998
- Headquarters: Bebington, Wirral Peninsula
- Location: 53°19′52″N 3°01′28″W
- Region served: Wirral, Cheshire, Merseyside, North Wales, St Helens, Isle of Man.
- Leader: David Pastor
- Staff: 200+
- Volunteers: 1000+

Claire House Children's Hospice is a children's hospice in Merseyside.

The hospice helps seriously and terminally ill children and young adults from 0–23 years by providing specialist nursing care and emotional support. It has provided care for children and young people across Merseyside, Cheshire and North Wales since it opened in 1998.

The organisation has two sites: a hospice in Bebington, the Wirral, and the Hub in West Derby, Liverpool, that offers day care. Support can be provided at Claire House or at home and can be for the child, young person or for family members.

The charity has featured on Children in Need in 2011, 2014 and 2016. It also has high-profile supporters including Steven Gerrard and Wayne Rooney.

As of 2017, the charity is providing care for over 200 babies, children and young people and supporting more than 200 bereaved families. In July 2015 Claire House was rated as 'Outstanding' by the Care Quality Commission.

Claire House, Wirral is open 24 hours a day, seven days a week and offers a range of services. Children can have fun in the multi-sensory room, art room, hydrotherapy pool and Jacuzzi. There is a separate wing complete with bar, sound system and Xbox for teenagers and young adults. Claire House also provides end of life care, ensuring that a child's last days are as comfortable and memorable as possible.

In 2016 the charity occupied a site in West Derby, Liverpool, that used to be a Carmelite Monastery. The Claire House Liverpool Hub opened in the summer of 2017, offering services such as counselling, holistic therapies and hospice to home support. Claire House hopes to one day open a new-state-of-the-art hospice on the site and reach out to more children in Merseyside.

Supporters of the charity include the Mowgli Trust which has donated £325,000. The trust was established by Nisha Katona, whose company Mowgli Street Food is headquartered in Liverpool.
