= High Sheriff of Merseyside =

British political office

This is a list of High Sheriffs of Merseyside. The High Sheriff is the King's judicial representative in Merseyside, serving a one year term starting in recent years in April.

- 1974–1975: Kenneth Maxwell Stoddart, of 6 The Knowe, Willaston, Wirral, Cheshire
- 1975–1976: Lieutenant Colonel Frank Vernon Denton, of Formby, Liverpool
- 1976–1977: Stephen Minion of Liverpool
- 1977–1978: Lieutenant Colonel George Fortnum Appleton of Shore House, Ainsdale, Southport
- 1978–1979: Major Henry Bertram Chrimes of Bracken Bank, Heswall, Wirral
- 1979–1980: Joseph Alexander Duncan of Home Farm, Landican, Birkenhead
- 1980–1981: Colonel Herbert Gerrard Thomas McClellan of Westwood, Hightown, Liverpool
- 1981–1982: Major Philip Johnson, of Kandy, Eccleston, St. Helens
- 1982–1983: Lieutenant Colonel Derek Isaac Heys of Fairway Cottage, West Kirby
- 1983–1984: Henry Brussell Bicket of Liverpool
- 1984–1985: Lieutenant Colonel Charles Henry Elston of Hoylake, Wirral
- 1985–1986: Colonel Dudley F Moore of Dunes Drive. Freshfield
- 1986–1987: Henry Egerton Cotton of Norwood, Grassendale Park, Liverpool
- 1987–1988: Colonel Mary Creagh of Formby
- 1988–1989: Lieutenant Colonel Francis John Kevin Williams, of 'Fairfield', Brimstage, Wirral
- 1989–1990: Colonel D. R. Morgan, of Birkdale, Southport, Merseyside
- 1990–1991: Commander Edward John Billington, of Gowan Brae, Dawstone Road, Heswall, Wirral
- 1991–1992: Jean Wotherspoon, of Elm Lodge, Hard Lane, Dentons Green, St. Helens, Merseyside
- 1992–1993: Alan William Waterworth, of Crewood Hall, Kingsley, Frodsham, Cheshire
- 1993–1994: Commodore Roderick H Walker
- 1994–1995: Anita Samuels
- 1995–1996: Anthony Shone
- 1996–1997: Jennifer Anne Grundy, of Roby, Liverpool, Merseyside.
- 1997–1998: Brian Thaxter
- 1998–1999: Colonel Sir Christopher Hewetson
- 1999–2000: Derek Morris
- 2000–2001: William David Fulton of Puddington
- 2001–2002: Professor Peter Toyne of Rotherham.
- 2002–2003: Lady Pilkington
- 2003–2004: Robert D Atlay
- 2004–2005: Stuart Christie of Liverpool.
- 2005–2006: Rosemary Helen Hawley of Liverpool
- 2006–2007: Michael Stuart Potts of Neston
- 2007–2008: Professor Philip N Love of Formby
- 2008–2009: Judith Louise Greensmith, of the Wirral
- 2009–2010: David C McDonnell of Liverpool
- 2010–2011: Roy Alfred Morris of Formby
- 2011–2012: Professor Helen M L Carty, of Liverpool
- 2012–2013: Colonel Martin Amlôt, of the Wirral
- 2013–2014: Robert Ian Shaw Meadows of Liverpool
- 2014–2015: Abila Pointing
- 2015–2016: Robert Owen of Woolton, Liverpool
- 2016–2017: James Christopher Meredith Davies, of Caldy, Wirral.
- 2017–2018: Stephen Burrows, of Willaston, South Wirral
- 2018–2019: Peter David Martin Woods, of Liverpool.
- 2019–2020: David Steer, of St Helens.
- 2020–2021: John Roberts of the Wirral.
- 2021–2022: Nigel Lanceley of the Wirral.
- 2022–2023: Lesley Martin-Wright of Liverpool.
- 2023–2024: Dr Ruth Hussey of Liverpool
