= Pro-Chancellor of Liverpool John Moores University =

- Incumbent; Sir Malcolm Thornton since 2007
- Style: Pro-Chancellor
- Appointer: Board of Governors
- Inaugural holder: John Moores, Jr.
- Formation: 1992

The Pro-Chancellor of Liverpool John Moores University is an academic officer at the university, acting on behalf of the Chancellor in their absence, or when the office is vacant. As Pro-Chancellor, the holder is also appointed as "Chairman of the Board of Governors" which includes chairing governor meetings and representing the board. The office in its own right is also representative of the university at certain events and engagements. All activities concerning the everyday functioning of the university are conducted by the Vice-Chancellor

The first Pro-Chancellor was John Moores, Jr., eldest son of Sir John Moores whom the university is named after. He was appointed in 1992 following the creation of the new generation university. Professor Maureen Williams became the second Pro-Chancellor in 1994 after serving as the universities Deputy-Chair of Governors, later being succeeded by Commodore Rod Walker who served four years in office.

As of 2007, Sir Malcolm Thornton currently serves as the Pro-Chancellor and Chair of Governors.

== List of pro-chancellors ==
No.	Image	Pro-Chancellor	Took office	Left office
1		John Moores, Jr.	1992	1994
2		Professor Maureen Williams		
3		Commodore Roderick Walker		
4		Sir Malcolm Thornton	2007	Incumbent
