= Pho (restaurant) =

British restaurant chain

Pho Holdings Ltd.
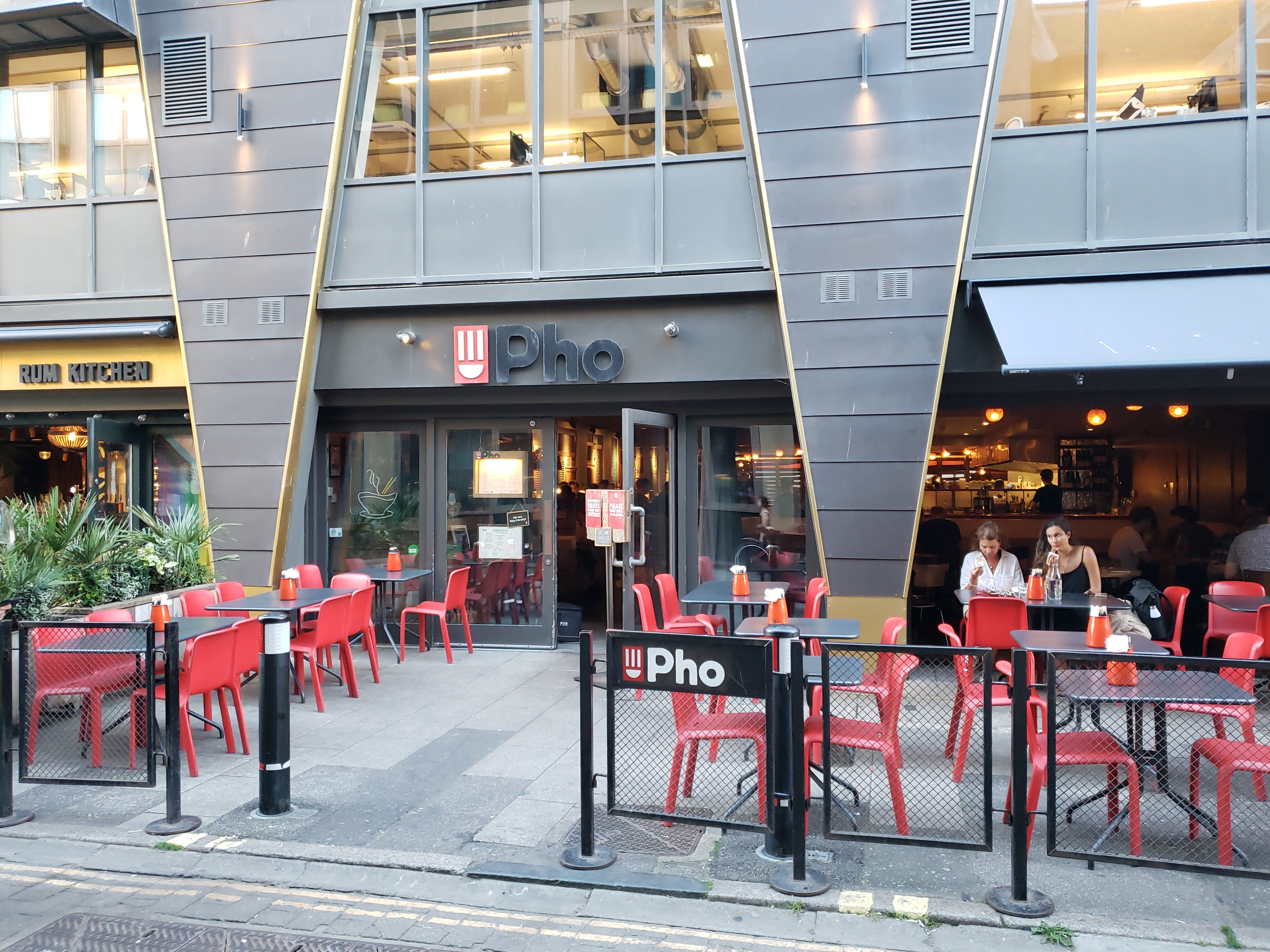
- Pho, Black Lion Street, Brighton in 2023
- Trade name: Pho
- Type: Private
- Traded as: Pho
- Industry: Casual dining
- Founded: 2005; 21 years ago in Clerkenwell, London
- Founder: Stephen Wall
- Number of locations: 46
- Products: Vietnamese cuisine
- Owner: TriSpan
- Parent: Arcturus Group
- Website: https://www.phocafe.co.uk/

Pho is a British restaurant chain specialising in Vietnamese cuisine.

== History ==
Pho was founded in 2005 by Stephen and Juliette Wall, with its first branch in Clerkenwell, London.

As of 2025, the company operates 46 branches across the UK.

On launch, restauranteurs Tom and Ed Martin were investors in the business, acquiring 50% of the business. Later in 2012, Gresham House Ventures invested £4.4 million into the group to fund new sites.

In 2021, the investment fund TriSpan acquired a majority stake in the business from Gresham House Ventures. In 2025, TripSpan formed a dedicated holding group, Artcurus Group which comprised Pho, Rosa's Thai Cafe and Mowgli Street Food.

== Menu ==
Pho's menu features its namesake soup, alongside spring rolls, and chicken wings.

In 2015, Pho was accredited by Coeliac UK, with 98% of its menu being gluten free.

== Controversies ==
Pho Holdings Ltd (the restaurant's parent company) have come under fire for threatening legal action against small, Vietnamese-owned businesses after trademarking the word "Pho". In late 2024, the trademark was surrendered following heavy social media backlash.
