= Ripon Grammar School =

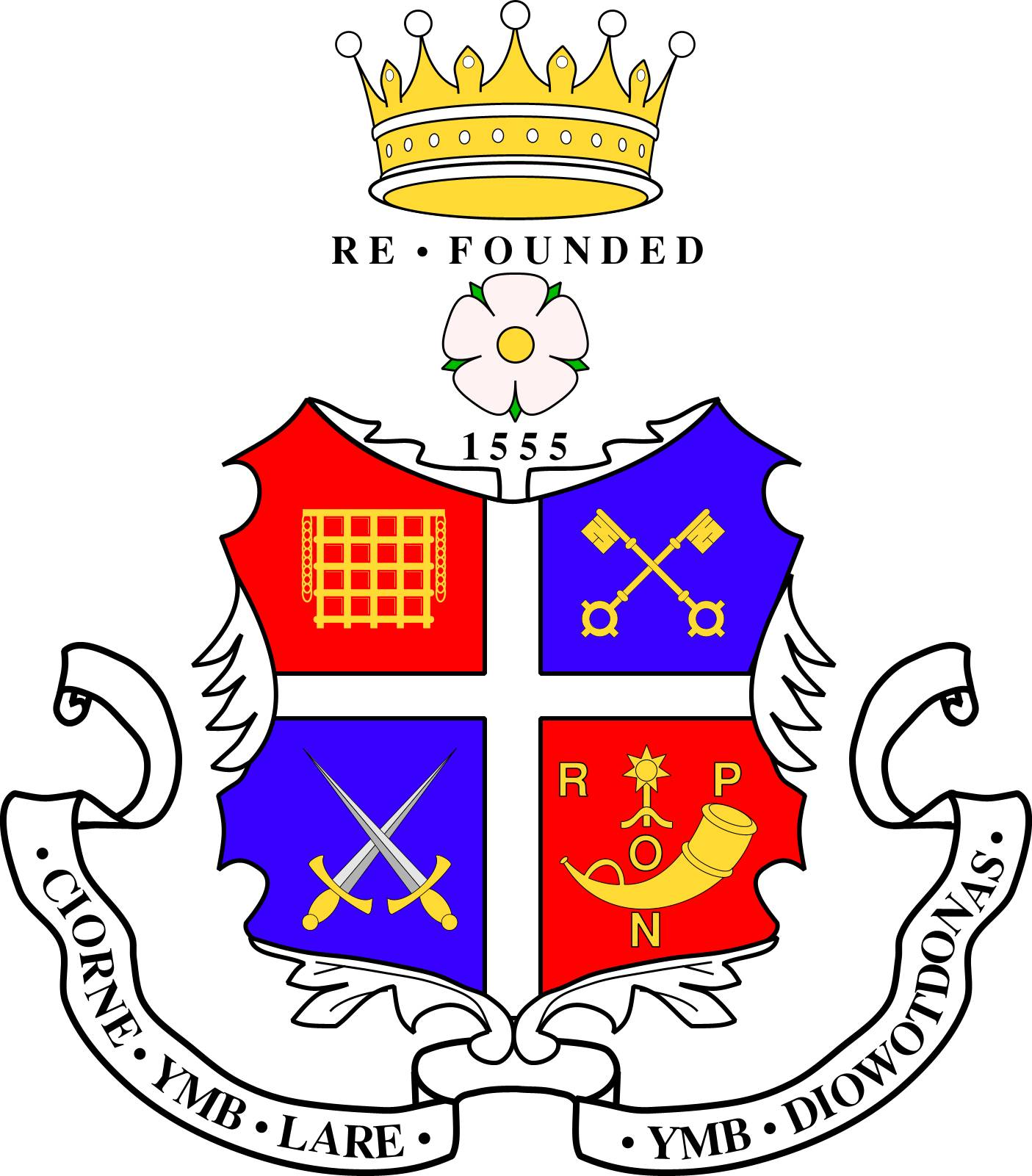

Location
- Clotherholme Road; Ripon, North Yorkshire, HG4 2DG; England; 54.139°N 1.5395°W

Information
- Type: Grammar school Day and boarding school
- Motto: Giorne ymb lare y diowatdomas (Old English: Eager to learn and seek after righteousness)
- Established: 1555; 471 years ago
- Local authority: North Yorkshire
- Department for Education URN: 121694 Tables
- Ofsted: Reports
- Chairman of Governors: Elizabeth Jarvis
- Headmaster: Jonathan Webb
- Gender: Coeducational
- Age: 11 to 18
- Enrolment: 920
- Houses: DeGrey; Hutton; Porteus; School / Holland
- Colours: Navy, blue and yellow
- Alumni: Old Riponians
- Website: www.ripongrammar.co.uk

Ripon Grammar School is a co-educational, boarding and day, selective grammar school in Ripon, North Yorkshire, England. It has been named top-performing state school in the north for ten years running by The Sunday Times. It is one of the best-performing schools in the North of England; in 2011, 91% of pupils gained the equivalent of 5 or more GCSEs at grade C or above, including English and maths; the figure has been over 84% consistently since at least 2006. As a state school, it does not charge fees for pupils to attend, but they must pass an entrance test at 11+ or 13+. There is no selection test for entry into sixth form as pupils are admitted on the basis of their GCSE grades.

== Admission ==
It is a selective school, one of the very few in the North of England (Penrith, Cumbria has the most northern grammar school).

== History ==
The school is believed to have been founded in Saxon times, but the first documentary proof of a school in the town is dated 1348 when Ricardum le Chamberlayn, who is described as 'the former master of the Schoolhouse' was one of 138 people who failed to appear before the Court of the King's Bench. It is suggested that he was involved in a mass disturbance, perhaps a riot. The medieval school, which was connected to a collegiate church in Ripon, was given land by benefactors but, in order to protect the school from the seizing of land by Henry VIII, priests told the king's commissioners the land had nothing to do with the church and the school was saved. However, in 1550, when the authorities discovered the chicanery that had occurred, the Duchy of Lancaster seized the lands and the future of the school was in doubt. Queen Mary, the only child of Henry VIII and his first wife, Catherine of Aragon, looked kindly on the school and signed a royal charter which established the Free Grammar School of Queen Mary at Ripon, granted the school's ten governors the disputed land. The re-founding in 1555 during the reign of Queen Mary is regarded as the foundation of the modern Ripon Grammar School. Originally a boys' school, the school merged with Ripon Girls' High School to become coeducational in 1962. Although most pupils are day pupils from the surrounding area and Ripon itself, there are boys' and girls' boarding houses, School House and Johnson House, which accommodate 100 pupils.

=== Motto ===
The school motto is the Old English phrase Giorne ymb lare ymb diowotdomas ("Eager to learn and seek after righteousness").

=== Traditions ===
In December, RGS holds its annual Festival of Nine Lessons and Carols in Ripon Cathedral, where student choirs and orchestras perform. In July, students, staff, governors and local dignitaries gather for the annual Commemoration Service at Ripon Cathedral to commemorate the school's founders and give thanks at the end of the school year.

The son of the first Marquis of Ripon, Earl de Grey, founded the exhibitions to universities, which are still presented to the school in the form of major and minor De Grey Awards at Speech Day every year.

There is an Old Riponians' Association Winter Reunion every year, when past pupils return to the school to challenge current students in a series of sports fixtures including rugby, hockey, football and netball.

Sixth form students organise a series of Charity Week events every year, including concerts, pantomimes, quizzes and dance competitions, raising around £15,000 for chosen charities annually. Recent charities which have benefited include St Michael's Hospice in Harrogate, Surfers Against Sewage and the Yorkshire Air Ambulance.

== Sport ==
The school offers sporting activities including swimming, tennis, rugby, cricket, climbing, netball, hockey and football. The U18 rugby team have won the Yorkshire championships three times running, most recently in 2020. The U-13 cricket team won the Yorkshire Cup in 2019. The U-18s girls' hockey team were State Boarding National Champions in 2019. The U-18s girls' netball team were awarded the National State Boarding Schools Championship trophy in 2019. RGS swimmers have made it to the national finals of the English Secondary Schools championships both in 2019 and 2020. A number of riders from the school's Equestrian Society have reached the national finals of the NSEA equestrian championships at Hickstead Arena.

British Lions player Sir Ian McGeechan opened the school's new rugby pitch in February 2020, an event also attended by past pupil Peter Squires, British Lion & England Rugby Union International/Yorkshire County Cricketer.

Olympic diver and gold medalist Jack Laugher attended RGS from Year 7 to the end of his sixth form in 2014. Team GB and World Championships cyclist Abi Smith joined sixth form in 2018 as a boarding student.

In 2012, pupil and Olympic diver Jack Laugher, then aged 17, backed the campaign to save the school's swimming pool from council cuts.

== Boarding ==
It is the only state-maintained boarding school in Yorkshire. After the Duchy of Lancaster seized its land in 1550, Queen Mary intervened to save the school, signing a royal charter in 1555 establishing the Free Grammar School of Queen Mary in Ripon. The founding charter stated the school was to be free of charge to local pupils. Due to the size and scale of rural North Yorkshire, and to overcome the lack of money, boarding was introduced for children in outlying villages and farms, but the school soon came to rely on the income and in the 1880s was plunged into financial uncertainty when wealthy families removed their boys from the school because of a rumour involving the headmaster and a local woman. There are two boarding houses, School House for boys and Johnson House for girls as well as the new School House annexe for girls, which house 100 students. Whereas opting to board may once have been a way to secure a place, that is no longer the case. Parents now commit for five years from Y7 and two years from Y12.

== Academic ==
The school is consistently among the top performing schools both regionally and nationally. In 2019 Schools minister Nick Gibb wrote to the headmaster to congratulate the school for being in the top two per cent of state-funded mainstream schools for progress to GCSEs. He congratulated staff and students on their latest results and said: "Thank you for your work in continuing the drive towards higher academic standards."

In 2019, more than 76% of all A-level grades achieved were at A*-B, with 14 students achieving a clean sweep of A*s. Nearly half of all grades awarded were at A*-A. At GCSE in the same year, 92% of grades were 9–5 and 62% 9-7s.

In 2018 and 2017, 76% and 79.1% of A-level grades were at A*-B and 64% of GCSE grades were 9-7/A*-A.

The school was listed in the top 5% of schools nationally for the progress students make in sixth form, based on outcomes over three years to 2019.

In 2018, the school's exam results placed it among the top 15 schools in the country.

In 2019 and 2020, the leading school comparison website School Guide awarded the school a five-star certificate for excellence, placing it among the top 20% of 34,000 state and independent schools in England.

== Sixth form ==
Ripon Grammar School has been placed in the top 5% of schools nationally for the progress students make in sixth form. The majority of students from lower years progress to the sixth form but the school also admits around 50 students every year from other local schools and further afield, with admission based on GCSE results. While academic outcomes are outstanding, the school encourages sixth formers to take on leadership roles and develop wider skills through enrichment activities encompassing everything from charity work and volunteering to sport, music, drama and business enterprise. There are also a wide range of student-led sixth form societies. Alongside A-levels, students can undertake an extended project qualification (EPQ).

== Houses ==
Every student is a member of one of four houses. In 1906, Porteus and Hutton houses – each named after a famous ex-pupil – and De Grey – named after a family of benefactors – were founded. School House, for boarders, was added in 1928. Every year, students take part in a series of points-based inter-house competitions, which include sport, debating and singing, traditionally a source of pride for pupils of respective houses. Hutton House is named after former Archbishop of Canterbury Matthew Hutton, who joined Ripon Grammar School in 1701. Porteus House is named after writer, preacher and Bishop of London Beilby Porteus, a keen supporter of the movement to abolish slavery, who joined Ripon Grammar School in 1744. De Grey House is named after Earl de Grey, the son of the first marquis of Ripon, and a generous benefactor of the school. School House was added in 1928 for boarding students but the membership has broadened to accommodate day pupils as well as boarders. In May 2025, School House was renamed Holland House after the previous teacher and England hockey player Barbara Holland.

== Music and drama ==
The school has a purpose-built music block which includes a bespoke recording studio and Apple Mac computer suite. The school's wide range of ensembles include the chamber orchestra, chamber choir and big band. Recent musical productions include Anything Goes, Les Misérables, Billy Elliott and Little Shop of Horrors.

In 2018, 100 singers from the school's five choirs recorded a Christmas album in Ripon Cathedral, where they regularly perform.

In 2022, string players in the Chamber Orchestra played the backing track for local band The Dunwells latest album.

The annual school production is the highlight of the year. Productions in recent years include Murder on the Nile and An Inspector Calls. The junior drama club meets weekly for workshop activities and improvisations and puts on a major production in the summer term. Productions have included Peter Pan, The Jungle Book and Scrooge.

There is a House drama competition every year, with each House putting on a short play, directed and produced by senior students, with students of all ages taking part.

== Parents' ballot ==
Ripon was the first and only school catchment area in England in which parents voted to keep a selective school in March 2000 by 1,493 to 747. Even the head of the neighbouring secondary modern school, Ripon College, Paul Lowery was in favour of keeping the selection system as it was, which contributed to the proposal's defeat. The campaign against the school was co-ordinated by Debbie Atkins, who like other local parents chose to send her children to school in Harrogate.

To force a ballot, petitions had to be successfully raised. These were allowed from December 1998, and Ripon was the only one out of 39 resulting in a ballot. The cost of administration of these petitions and the one ballot was £437,000. The huge cost of administration came from education officials having to write individually to registered parents at feeder primary schools. In the year of the ballot – 1999/2000 – £216,283 was spent on the petition procedure's administration. The vote was allowed by the School Standards and Framework Act 1998.

=== Headmasters ===
- pre 1348 Richard Chamberlain,
- pre 1371 – post 1380 Master Thomas,
- in 1421 – John Chambre
- pre 1545 – post 1477 Henry Singleton,
- 1545 – 1553 Edmund Brown
- 1571 John Nettleton
- 1608 Christopher Lyndall
- 1622 John Ashmore
- 1623–1650 Richard Palmes
- 1650–1661 Roger Holmes
- 1661–1676 Charles Oxley
- 1676–1681 George Loup
- 1681–1685 Ralph Cottingham
- 1685–1704 Thomas Thomson
- 1704–1721 Thomas Lloyd
- 1721–1730 John Barber
- 1731–1737 Thomas Stevens
- 1737 William Scott
- 1738 James Topham
- 1738–1771 George Hyde
- 1772–1798 Solomon Robinson
- 1798–1809 Isaac Cook
- 1809–1811 William Ewbank
- 1812–1851 William Plues
- 1851–1872 J. F. MacMichael
- 1872–1879 F. A. Hooper
- 1879–1890 A. B. Haslam
- 1890–1895 W. Yorke Fausset
- 1895–1919 C. C. S. Bland
- 1919–1935 James Dyson
- 1935–1957 W. J. Strachan
- 1957–1974 Robert Atkinson
- 1974–1991 Brian Stanley
- 1992–2004 Alan Jones
- 2004–2017 Martin Pearman
- 2017–present Jonathan Webb

=== Former teachers ===
- Thomas Ashworth, headteacher of Ermysted's Grammar School in Skipton from 1998 to 2008 (head of maths from 1983 to 1988)

== Old Riponians ==
Former pupils are known as Old Riponians. The contact details for the alumni association are available on the school's website.

Notable old Riponians include:

- William Hague, former Secretary of State for Foreign and Commonwealth Affairs
- Katharine Viner, editor-in-chief of The Guardian from summer 2015
- Richard Hammond, television presenter – Top Gear/Total Wipeout/Richard Hammond's Blast Lab/The Grand Tour
- David Curry, former Member of Parliament for Skipton & Ripon (head boy in 1962)
- Bruce Oldfield, fashion designer
- Matthew Hutton (Archbishop of Canterbury)
- David George Kendall, statistician, Professor of Mathematical Statistics from 1962 to 1985 at the University of Cambridge
- Peter Squires, British Lion & England Rugby Union International/Yorkshire County Cricketer
- Peter Toyne, CBE, 1st Vice-Chancellor from 1992 to 2000 of Liverpool John Moores University, and Rector from 1986 to 1992 of Liverpool Polytechnic
- Paul Hullah, writer
- Jack Laugher, British Olympic Diver (Gold Medallist at Rio 2016)
- Peter Marshall, Ambassador to Algeria from 1995 to 1996
- Maurice Edwards, Chaplain-in-Chief of the RAF from 1940 to 1944
- Francis Pigou, Dean of Bristol from 1891 to 1916
- Beilby Porteus, Georgian Bishop of Chester and London
- William Stubbs, the Victorian Bishop of Oxford from 1889 to 1901, and Regius Professor of Modern History (Oxford) from 1866 to 1884

== See also ==
- Listed buildings in Ripon
