= Vere Egerton Cotton =

British Army officer and politician

Colonel Vere Cotton CBE, JP

Lord Mayor of Liverpool
- In office 1951–1952
- Preceded by: Revd. Harry Longbottom
- Succeeded by: Albert Morrow

Personal details
- Born: 5 May 1882
- Died: 19 November 1970 (aged 88)

Colonel Vere Egerton Cotton C.B.E. (1882–1970) was a British Army officer and politician who served as Lord Mayor of Liverpool.

== Biography ==
Cotton was born in London 5 May 1882 and was the youngest son of Charles Calveley Cotton. Colonel Cotton was educated at Repton School and Magdalene College, Cambridge where he was an exhibitioner in 1910. He was a senior partner in Rathbone Brothers and Company, merchants in Liverpool.

Cotton was commissioned in the 4th West Lancashire Brigade and during the first World War he served in France, Belgium and Italy. He was made an Officer of the British Empire in the 1919 New Year honours, awarded the Croix de Guerre and Croce di Guerra and held the Territorial Decoration. From 1932 to 1936 he commanded the 359th Regiment, R.A., T.A., and retired from the army as a Lieutenant-Colonel. He was appointed Commander, Order of the British Empire (C.B.E.) in 1937.

Cotton entered the Liverpool City Council in 1931 as a representative of Aigburth Ward. He was made a city magistrate in 1938. He served as Lord Mayor of Liverpool from 1951 to 1952 and High Sheriff of Lancashire in 1956.

He is the father of Henry Egerton Cotton, Lord Lieutenant of Merseyside.

== See also ==
- 1931 Liverpool City Council election
- Liverpool City Council elections 1880–present
- Mayors and Lord Mayors of Liverpool 1207 to present
- High Sheriff of Lancashire
