= Mowgli Street Food =

UK-based Indian restaurant chain

- Industry: Casual dining
- Genre: Indian cuisine
- Founded: 2014; 12 years ago in Liverpool, England
- Founder: Nisha Katona
- Headquarters: Liverpool, England
- Number of locations: 27 (2025)
- Revenue: ▲£40.4 million (2024)
- Net income: ▲£512,000 (2024)
- Owner: Nisha Katona; Arcturus Group
- Number of employees: 833 (2024)
- Website: www.mowglistreetfood.com

Mowgli Street Food is a restaurant chain in the United Kingdom that serves Indian cuisine. It was established in Liverpool in 2014 by Nisha Katona, a former barrister. As of 2025, it has 27 branches. Through the Mowgli Trust the company and its employees have raised £2.7 million to charities as of March 2026.

== History ==
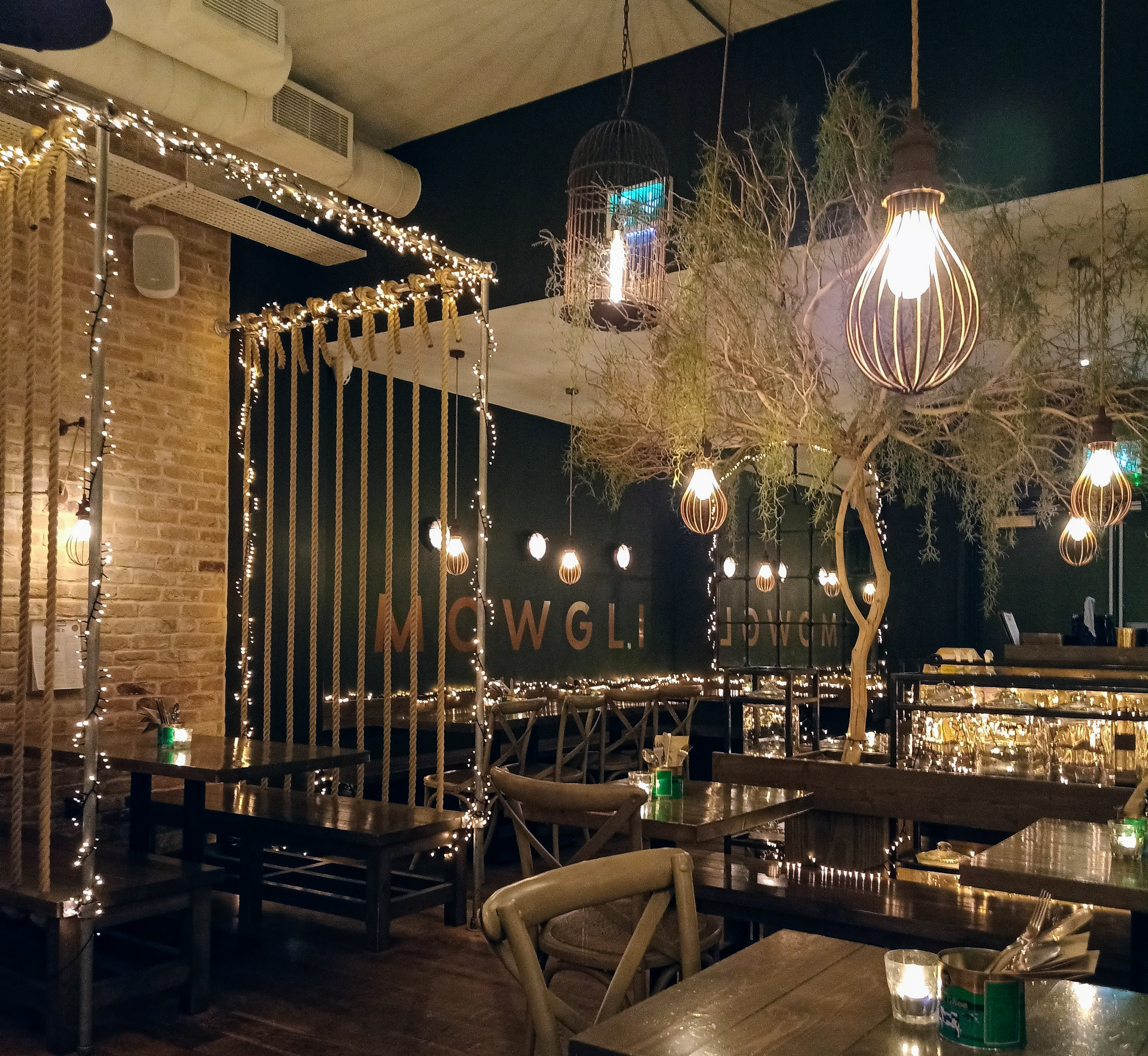
Interior view of the Mowgli Street Food restaurant in Cardiff, Wales, which opened in July 2019

Mowgli Street Food was founded in 2014 by former barrister and YouTube cook Nisha Katona. She opened the first restaurant on 23 October 2014 in Bold Street, Liverpool.

Katona chose to focus on home-cooked Indian cuisine rather than the traditional Anglo-Indian cuisine served in most Indian restaurants in the UK. In 2018, she published a book Mowgli Street Food: Stories and recipes from the Mowgli Street Food restaurants, which was followed in 2021 by 30 Minute Mowgli: Fast Easy Indian from the Mowgli Home Kitchen.

By 2019, Mowgli Street Food had seven restaurants and a turnover of £10 million. In 2021, with 12 restaurants across the north of England, the first London restaurant opened in Fitzrovia.

In 2023, when the chain had expanded to 15 restaurants, private equity firm TriSpan acquired a stake in the company. TriSpan owns part of Vietnamese restaurant chain Pho, and Rosa's Thai Cafe, as part of its Arcturus Group. TriSpan also acquired the share owned by Foresight Group, who had invested in the business in 2017 when it had three restaurants.

In 2023, the company made a loss of £476,000 on sales of £30.8 million. In 2024, it returned a profit of £512,000 on sales of £40.4 million, with 833 employees.

As of September 2025, there are 27 Mowgli Street Food restaurants.

== Mowgli Trust ==
Mowgli Street Food and its employees raise money for health and education charities through the Mowgli Trust. As of March 2026, the trust had donated £2.7 million to various charities, including over £325,000 to Claire House Children's Hospice in the charity's home city of Liverpool.
