= Malcolm Thornton =

British politician (born 1939)

Sir Malcolm Thornton

4th Pro-Chancellor of Liverpool John Moores University
- Incumbent
- Assumed office 2007
- Preceded by: Cdre. Rod Walker DL

Member of Parliament for Crosby
- In office 9 June 1983 – 8 April 1997
- Preceded by: Shirley Williams
- Succeeded by: Claire Curtis-Thomas

Member of Parliament for Liverpool Garston
- In office 3 May 1979 – 13 May 1983
- Preceded by: Eddie Loyden
- Succeeded by: Eddie Loyden

Wirral Metropolitan Borough Councillor for North Liscard-Upper Brighton Street
- In office 12 April 1973 – 3 May 1979
- Preceded by: Council Created
- Succeeded by: B. Nottage

Leader of Wirral Metropolitan Borough Council
- In office 1974–1977
- Preceded by: Bill Whitehurst
- Succeeded by: Harry Deverill

Personal details
- Born: 3 April 1939 (age 87)
- Party: Conservative
- Spouse(s): Rosemary, Lady Thornton

Sir George Malcolm Thornton FRSA (born 3 April 1939) is a British Conservative politician who served as the Member of Parliament (MP) for Liverpool Garston from 1979 to 1983, and for Crosby from 1983 to 1997.

== Education ==
He was educated at Wallasey Grammar School and later attended Liverpool Nautical College.

== Political career ==
Thornton was first elected to Parliament in the 1979 general election, winning the marginal seat of Liverpool Garston from Labour's Eddie Loyden. In the early 1980s, however, all seats were re-organised with the new boundaries set to come in at the next election. Liverpool Garston would lean strongly towards Labour, so Thornton sought a safer seat in Crosby, just outside Liverpool. However, following the death of Sir Graham Page in 1981, Shirley Williams, a former Labour Cabinet minister who had founded the centrist SDP a few months earlier, won the seat. That by-election had been held in the depths of Margaret Thatcher's unpopularity; however, after that the economy returned to growth and Britain won the Falklands War, so Thatcher called an election in 1983 which was a Tory landslide. Thornton regained the seat, while Eddie Loyden won a redrawn Garston for Labour. However, by 1997, the Conservatives were again deeply unpopular and Thornton lost, by a surprisingly wide margin to Labour's Claire Curtis-Tansley.

In 2007, Sir Malcolm Thornton became the 4th and current Pro-Chancellor and Chairman of the Board of Governors for Liverpool John Moores University.

Parliament of the United Kingdom
Preceded by Eddie Loyden	Member of Parliament for Liverpool Garston; 1979 – 1983	Succeeded by Eddie Loyden
Preceded by Shirley Williams	Member of Parliament for Crosby; 1983 – 1997	Succeeded by Claire Curtis-Thomas
Academic offices
Preceded by Cdre. Rod Walker	Pro-Chancellor of Liverpool John Moores University; 2007	Succeeded by Incumbent
