= Martin Amlôt =

British Army officer (born 1947)

- Born: 1947 (age 78–79); Wirral
- Education: King's School, Chester, RMA Sandhurst
- Military career
- Allegiance: United Kingdom
- Branch: British Army
- Service years: 1967–1994
- Rank: Colonel
- Service number: 484810
- Unit: King's Regiment
- Commands: 5th/8th Battalion, King's Regiment
- Awards: Officer of the Order of the British Empire; Officer of the Order of St John

Colonel Martin Graham Clive Amlôt, OBE, OStJ, DL (born 1947) is a retired British Army officer, former High Sheriff of Merseyside and former Deputy Lieutenant of Merseyside.

== Military career and later appointments ==
Amlôt attended the Royal Military Academy Sandhurst, before commissioning into the King's Regiment on 15 December 1967. He was promoted to Lieutenant on 15 June 1969, Captain on 15 December 1973, and Major on 30 September 1980. During his time in the King's Regiment, and then as a staff officer, Amlôt served in the Caribbean, Germany, Canada, Norway, Hong Kong, the Falkland Islands, Kenya, Northern Ireland, and the United States. As a major, he became the second-in-command of 1st Battalion, King's Regiment; before being promoted to Lieutenant Colonel on 30 June 1990, and taking command of the 5th/8th Battalion, King's Regiment. He finally served as Secretary to the Commanders in Chiefs' Committee (Germany), before retiring from the army on 1 November 1994. In 1994, Amlôt transferred to Merseyside Army Cadet Force, as the Commandant of the county. He completed the appointment and left in 1999.

Once retired, Amlôt became the Regimental Secretary of the King's Regiment, seeing him run the home headquarters of the regiment. When the regiment amalgamated with two others to become the Duke of Lancaster's Regiment in 2006, he was appointed Regimental Secretary once more of the new regiment, and continued in that capacity until 2011.

== Voluntary appointments ==
He was appointed as the High Sheriff of Merseyside for 2012–2013, and served as a Deputy Lieutenant of Merseyside from November 2000 to June 2022.

Amlôt also serves as a Patron of Sefton Council for Voluntary Services, the President of the Royal School for the Blind Charity, Liverpool, the President of the Liverpool Geological Society, the Treasurer of the Arts Society Wirral, and a member of the Foundation of Liverpool College. He was the 2020-21 President of the Liverpool Athenaeum, and the President of St John Ambulance in Merseyside between 2013 and 2023.

== Awards ==
Amlôt was appointed an OBE in the 1993 Queen's Birthday Honours. In 2008, he was appointed a Serving Brother of the Order of St John, received an Order service medal in 2011, and was appointed an Officer of the Order in 2013.

== Personal life ==
In 1971 he married Jacqueline Pyett of Bridport in Dorset. They had two sons. He was widowed in 1987 and married again. His wife, Daphne Amlôt, MBE (Nee Frost) was born in Southsea, Hampshire.
