= Albert Morrow (politician) =

Irish businessman and politician (1883–1969)

Albert Morrow JP

Lord Mayor of Liverpool
- In office 1952–1953
- Preceded by: Colonel Vere Cotton C.B.E.
- Succeeded by: William John Tristram

Albert Morrow JP (1883–1969) was an Irish businessman and local politician who served as Lord Mayor of Liverpool.

== Biography ==
Morrow was born in Ireland in 1883 and migrated to Liverpool at an early age. He was governing director of a chain of outfitting businesses in Liverpool and district.

In 1921 he stood for the Conservatives in the liberal stronghold of Anfield and was defeated by 13 votes. After another unsuccessful attempt in Anfield in 1926, he transferred his candidature to West Derby Ward and was elected to Liverpool City Council on 1 November 1929 as a Conservative. He remained unseated in West Derby until he became an Alderman for Princes Park in 1942. He became a city Magistrate in 1941 and took an active part in juvenile court work.

He served as Lord Mayor of Liverpool from 1952 to 1953.

== See also ==
- 1921 Liverpool City Council election
- 1926 Liverpool City Council election
- 1929 Liverpool City Council election
- Liverpool City Council elections 1880–present
- Liverpool City Council
- Mayors and Lord Mayors of Liverpool 1207 to present
