= Whitcliffe Mount School =

Location
- Turnsteads Avenue; Cleckheaton; Cleckheaton, West Yorkshire, BD19 3AQ; England; 53.7265°N 1.7282°W

Information
- Type: Comprehensive; Academy
- Motto: Work Hard, Model Kindness, Aim High
- Established: 22 September 1908
- Local authority: Kirklees
- Trust: SHARE Multi Academy Trust
- Department for Education URN: 149162 Tables
- Ofsted: Reports
- Headteacher: Zoe Ali
- Gender: Mixed
- Age: 11 to 16
- Enrolment: 1,237 as of October 2023
- Capacity: 1250
- Language: English
- Houses: Wadsworth, Whiteley, Mowat, Clough, Grylls
- Website: https://www.whitcliffemount.co.uk/

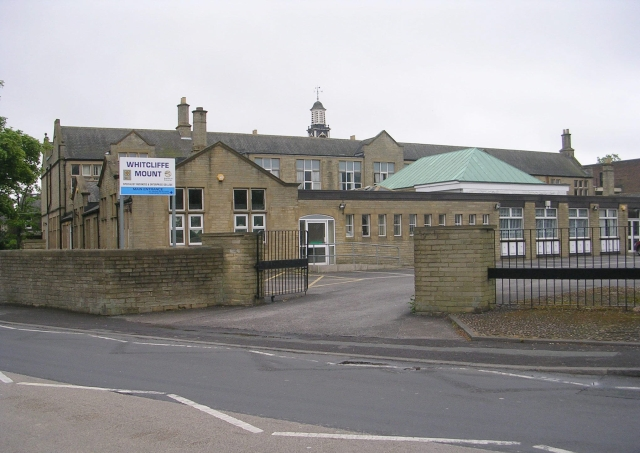

Whitcliffe Mount School is a mixed secondary school located in Cleckheaton, West Yorkshire, England.

== History ==
It was established as Cleckheaton Secondary School in 1908 in temporary premises on Brooke Street. The school moved to its current location in the town in 1910 and was renamed Cleckheaton Secondary and Technical School. Under the Education Act 1944 the school became Whitcliffe Mount Grammar School, and when the school became comprehensive in 1973 it was renamed Whitcliffe Mount School.

Previously a voluntary controlled school administered by Kirklees Metropolitan Borough Council, in September 2022 Whitcliffe Mount School converted to academy status. The school is now sponsored by the SHARE Multi Academy Trust.

== Academics ==
Whitcliffe Mount School offers GCSEs, BTECs and OCR Nationals as programmes of study for pupils.

== Notable former pupils ==
- Wendy Holden, writer and novelist
- Sarah Holt, athlete
- Paul Whitaker, cricketer
- Nigel Scrutton, academic and biotechnology innovator
- Reginald C. Sutcliffe, meteorologist, first Director of Research for the Meteorological Office
- Lois Toulson, diver

=== Whitcliffe Mount Grammar School ===
- Jeff Butterfield, international rugby player
- Nigel Weatherill, academic
