= Lorna Muirhead =

Dame DCVO DBE CStJ DL Lorna Elizabeth Muirhead
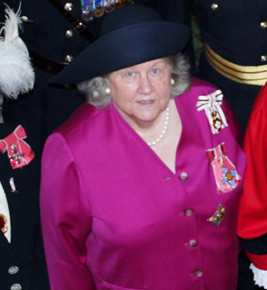

Lord Lieutenant of Merseyside
- In office 11 October 2006 – 12 September 2017

Personal details
- Born: September 1942 (age 84) Shropshire, England
- Spouse: Ronald Muirhead
- Children: 2

Dame Lorna Elizabeth Muirhead DCVO DBE CStJ DL FRCOG (née Fox) is a past President of the Royal College of Midwives and from 2006 until her retirement in 2017 she served as the Lord Lieutenant of Merseyside.

In 1992, she joined the Council of the Royal College of Midwives (RCM) and was elected president in 1997. She served two terms until 2004 while continuing her work as a clinical midwife.

== Early life ==
Lorna Elizabeth Fox was born in September 1942 in Shropshire, England.

== Other affiliations ==
Muirhead was a midwifery adviser on Baby Lifeline; a member of the Council of the Liverpool School of Tropical Medicine; national midwifery adviser for St John Ambulance; and served as Lord Lieutenant of Merseyside.

She is also currently (June 2011) president of Merseyside County Scout Council, a county of The Scout Association in the United Kingdom. Dame Lorna is a long-standing co-president (with eminent obstetrician Professor James Drife) of the national charity Baby Lifeline. She is also a patron of the Birkenhead Choral Society. She is an honorary member of The Rotary Club of Birkenhead.

During her presidency she represented the RCM in, among other venues:

- Council of the Royal College of Obstetricians and Gynaecologists (RCOG)
- Joint RCM/RCOG committee
- Standing Nursing and Midwifery Advisory Committee (SNMAC)
- Women's National Commission
- Council of the International Confederation of Midwives
- Specialist Register of the English National Board
- Benevolent Fund Committee of the Royal College of Midwives Trust
- Council of the Kings Fund
- National Service Framework for Midwifery

== Personal details ==
She is married to Ronald Muirhead. The couple has a son and a daughter.

== Honours ==
- She was appointed Dame Commander of the Order of the British Empire (DBE) in 2000 for her services to midwifery.
- In 2001, she became a fellow of the RCOG and was made an Honorary Fellow of Liverpool's John Moores University the same year. In 2004 she received the inaugural award from the RCM for her lifetime achievement in midwifery.
- She was appointed Dame Commander of the Royal Victorian Order (DCVO) in the 2017 New Year Honours for her services as Lord Lieutenant of Merseyside.
