= Nisha Katona =

British restaurateur and television personality (born 1971)

Nisha Katona MBE
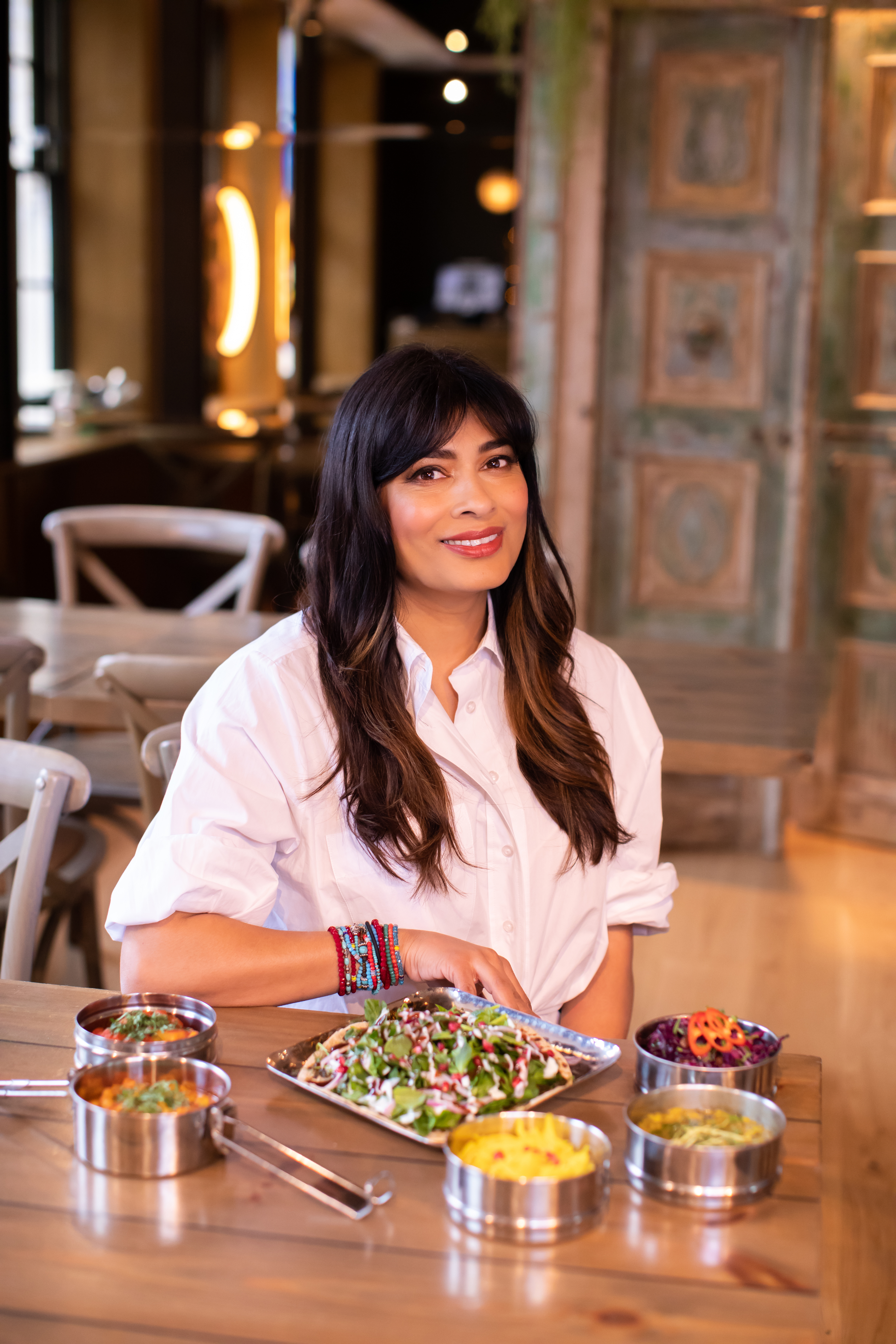
- Katona in 2024
- Born: Nisha Sujata Biswas; 23 October 1971 (age 54); Ormskirk, Lancashire, England
- Education: Liverpool John Moores University
- Occupations: CEO, restaurateur, barrister, author
- Spouse: Zoltan Katona
- Culinary career
- Cooking style: Indian

6th Chancellor of Liverpool John Moores University
- Incumbent
- Assumed office 1 January 2022
- Vice-Chancellor: Mark Power
- Preceded by: Brian Leveson
- Website: www.mowglistreetfood.com

Nisha Katona MBE (née Biswas; born 23 October 1971) is a British restaurateur, Television Cook, presenter and TV personality. The daughter of two doctors, she is the founder of Mowgli Street Food restaurants and the Mowgli Trust charity, a food writer and television presenter. She was a child protection barrister for 20 years.

== Early life ==
Nisha Sujata Biswas grew up in Skelmersdale. She attended Scarisbrick Hall School. She went on to study Law at Liverpool John Moores University, where she met her future husband, Zoltán Katona. She qualified as a barrister at the Inns of Court School of Law in 1996, and is a member of Lincoln's Inn.

Katona worked full-time as a barrister in Chavasse Court Chambers in Liverpool. In 2008, the Department of Culture, Media and Sport appointed her as a trustee of National Museums Liverpool where she sat on the full board, along with audit and marketing. In 2009, the Cabinet Office appointed her Ambassador for Diversity in Public Appointments.

== Career ==
Katona worked full-time as a child protection barrister for 20 years on the Northern Circuit. In 2008, the Department of Culture, Media and Sport appointed her a trustee of National Museums Liverpool and in 2009 she was appointed Ambassador for Diversity in Public Appointments by the Cabinet Office. She then switched to teaching about Indian cuisine. She founded Mowgli Street Food restaurants in the UK, and also founded and chairs the Mowgli Trust, which donates over £500,000 to local and world charities every year.

Katona is the author of six cookbooks: Pimp My Rice, The Spice Tree, The Mowgli Street Food: Authentic Indian Street Food, The 30-Minute Mowgli, Meat Free Mowgli and Bold. She regularly appears on television and radio, including the BBC, ITV, Channel 4, Channel 5, Food Network and Radio 4's programme The Kitchen Cabinet.

On 1 January 2022, Katona was appointed chancellor of Liverpool John Moores University. She is the first alumna of the university to become chancellor and replaces Sir Brian Leveson who became emeritus chancellor.

In July 2021, Katona was selected to join the newly formed Hospitality Council, a team of leading industry experts assembled to deliver the government’s Hospitality Strategy. The strategy aims to help hospitality firms to re-open, recover and become more resilient following the COVID pandemic.

In 2019, Katona received an MBE (New Year Honours 2019) for services to the food industry.

== Television ==
Katona films regularly for the BBC, Channel 4, ITV and The Food Network. Appearances have been on Lorraine, Sunday Brunch, Secret Chef, My Kitchen Rules, My Spice Kitchen and her own Indian food travelogue for the BBC, Recipes that made me.

She regularly appears as a guest chef on This Morning, guest panelist on The Kitchen Cabinet on BBC Radio 4, and on both BBC News and Sky News as a guest expert on matters relating to business and hospitality.

On 14 February 2021, a 10-part culinary travel series presented by Katona called A Taste of Italy was premiered on Channel 4 and More 4.

On 16 March 2021, she was a guest judge in the semi-final of Interior Design Masters, in which the designers made over a pair of restaurants in Hebden Bridge.

On 13 July 2021, Katona was one of the professional chefs on ITV's Cooking with the Stars. In the six-part series, she trained her celebrity partner, Harry Judd, in preparing dishes which were then judged. In the final episode, Judd was named the winner.

On 10 August 2021, Katona appeared as a guest chef on BBC 1's Masterchef, challenging four celebrities to cook an Indian recipe from her menu.

From 2021 - 2024, Katona was one of the members of the new judging panel of Great British Menu, joining the former champion Tom Kerridge and the comedian and food podcaster Ed Gamble.

In September 2024, Nisha Katona’s Home Kitchen was commissioned by ITV. The ten-part cookery series is presented by Katona and began airing in 2025.

== Books ==
- Mowgli Street Food: Stories and recipes from the Mowgli Street Food restaurants
- The Spice Tree: Indian Cooking Made Beautifully Simple
- Pimp My Rice: Delicious recipes from across the globe
- The 30-Minute Mowgli: Fast Easy Indian from the Mowgli Home
- Meat Free Mowgli: Simple & Delicious Plant Based Indian Meals
- BOLD: Big Flavour Twists to Classic Dishes

== Awards and honours ==
- Sunday Times Best Places to Work 2024 – Listed as a best Best Big Company to work for
- Sunday Times Best Places to Work 2023 – TOP 10 Best Big Companies
- Best Companies’ 2023 – TOP 25 Best Large Companies
- Casual Dining Awards 2023 – Restaurant Brand of the Year (1-19 sites)
- British HR Awards 2023 – Hospitality and Leisure Company of the Year
- North West Finance Awards 2023 – Finance Team of the Year (5 or less)
- MIB – Restaurant of the Year and Business of the Year 2023
- British Curry Awards 2022 - Best Restaurant North West
- Best Companies Awards 2022 - The UK’s Top 100 Best Large Companies to work for - Rank #16.
- Best Companies Awards 2021 - The UK’s Top 100 Best Large Companies to work for - Rank #28.
- Casual Dining Awards 2020 - The Trailblazer of the Year Award.
- Honorary Doctor of Business Administration - Edge Hill University (2019).
- Honorary Fellow - Liverpool John Moores University (2019).
- MBE - (New Year Honours 2019) Honoured for services to the food industry.
- The LDC Top 50 Most Ambitious Business Leaders, 2019.
- The Sunday Times Fast Track 100 2019 - Best Emerging Brand Award.
- The Sunday Times Fast Track 100 2019 - Best Management Team Award.
- The Sunday Times Fast Track 100 2019 - Rank #45.
- The Sunday Times Fast Track 100 2018 - Rank #17.
- Retailers’ Retailer Winner 2018 - Emerging Concept.
- Wireless Social's Woman Entrepreneur of the Year, 2018.
- Business of the Year, City of Liverpool Business Awards - 2018
- Best Medium Sized Business, North West Business Masters Awards - 2018
- Maserati Top 100, People's choice
