= John Moores Jr. =

Businessperson

John Moores Jr. CBE, DL

2nd Chancellor of Liverpool John Moores University
- In office 1994–1999
- Vice-Chancellor: Prof. Peter Toyne, CBE
- Preceded by: Henry Egerton Cotton, JP, DL
- Succeeded by: Cherie Blair, QC

1st Pro-Chancellor of Liverpool John Moores University
- In office 1992–1994
- Chancellor: Henry Egerton Cotton, JP, DL
- Succeeded by: Prof. Maureen Williams

Personal details
- Born: 22 November 1928
- Died: 22 May 2012 (aged 83)
- Spouse: Jane Moores
- Relations: Sir John Moores (father) Ruby Knowles (mother); Betty Suenson-Taylor, The Dowager Lady Grantchester (sister); Sir Peter Moores (brother) Janitha Moores (sister)
- Education: Eton College, Berkshire, England; Syracuse University, NY, US
- Profession: Businessman, Philanthropist, Farmer

John Moores Jr., CBE, DL, (22 November 1928 – 22 May 2012) was a British businessman, farmer and philanthropist. He was the eldest son of businessman Sir John Moores CBE who founded the Littlewoods company. He became Executive Director and Deputy Chairman of the family firm in 1968. John Moores also served as 2nd Chancellor of Liverpool John Moores University from 1994, after previously serving as the university's First Pro-Chancellor and chairman of the board of Governors from 1992.

== Littlewoods ==
John Moores was born at Beech Lawn Nursing Home, Waterloo, Merseyside, on 22 November 1928. He joined Littlewoods in 1946. He became a director of the organisation in 1950 and was Chair of the Littlewoods Equal Opportunities strategy committee from the mid 1960s until October 1996 after wanting to promote equal opportunities in the firm following his return from the United States after a two-year academic stay. In 1968 he became the executive director and deputy chairman but resigned on 11 February 1971 after a disagreement with his father, whilst remaining on the board of directors.

== Later life ==
John Moores resigned as a director at Littlewoods in October 1996 after 50 years of working for the firm to spend time breeding Aberdeen-Angus Cattle at his farm in Formby, Merseyside, which he and his wife second wife Jane began in 1964. He was a member of the Aberdeen-Angus Cattle Society, of which he later became president and in March 2012 was the first of its members to be awarded the society's Hugh Watson Lifetime Achievement Award.

He continued to promote equality in Liverpool just as he had done in the company. He chaired the Liverpool Charity and Voluntary Services until 1986, help to establish the organisation 'Priority' which helps disadvantaged children, and established 'South Liverpool Personnel' which helps the city's black community to find jobs. For his charitable work in Merseyside, he was awarded a CBE in 1993, and made a Freeman of the City of Liverpool on 16 March 1994. He received the award in a ceremony on 7 October 1994.

== Liverpool John Moores University ==
As a supporter of education, John Moores remained in a long association with Liverpool John Moores University which took its name from his father. He remained a trustee, and served as Pro-Chancellor and Chair of the Board of Governors from 1992 until 1994, when he became the university's 2nd Chancellor until the end of his term in 1999. He was appointed Chancellor Emeritus of the university and was an honorary fellow.

== Family and education ==
John Moores was the eldest son of Sir John Moores, businessman and founder of the Littlewoods empire and Ruby Knowles. He had two sisters and one brother. His older sister Betty Suenson-Taylor, The Dowager Lady Grantchester, who married her husband Kenneth Bent Suenson-Taylor, 2nd Baron Grantchester, his younger brother Sir Peter Moores, CBE, DL and younger sister Janitha Moores.

He was educated at Eton College, Berkshire, from the Autumn of 1941 where he excelled academically and in sports, and later spent two years at Syracuse University in New York in the late 1940s studying a business course.

== Personal life ==
John Moores married twice. First in London to Helen Sheila Moore on 21 December 1949. They had four children: Susan, born on her father's 22nd birthday in November 1950; John Moores III on 30 June 1952; Simon on 7 June 1955; and Patrick in 1958, but they divorced in December 1962. He married a second time to Jane Stavely-Dick on 19 October 1963 in Devon. They had three children, Toby in 1965, Barnaby in 1966, Lucy in 1969, and adopted a son, Kevin, aged 10 in 1978.

He died suddenly on 22 May 2012.

Academic offices
Preceded by N/A	Pro-Chancellor of Liverpool John Moores University; 1992–1994	Succeeded by Prof. Maureen Williams
Preceded by Henry Egerton Cotton	Chancellor of Liverpool John Moores University; 1994–1999	Succeeded by Cherie Blair
