= Nigel Weatherill =

British academic

3rd Vice-Chancellor of Liverpool John Moores University
- In office 2011–2018
- Chancellor: Brian Leveson; Brian May
- Preceded by: Michael Brown
- Succeeded by: Mark Power

Pro-Vice-Chancellor and Head of the College of Engineering and Physical Science University of Birmingham
- In office 2008–2011

Pro-Vice-Chancellor (Research) University of Swansea
- In office 2002–2008

Personal details
- Born: Cleckheaton, Yorkshire, England
- Spouse: Barbara Weatherill
- Children: 2
- Education: University of Southampton

Nigel Peter Weatherill is a British academic who is the former Vice-Chancellor and Chief Executive of Liverpool John Moores University (2011-2018).

Previously, Weatherill was Pro-Vice-Chancellor at the University of Birmingham, Pro-Vice Chancellor at the University of Swansea, Adjunct Professor at Mississippi State University, Scientist-in Residence in Singapore Institute for High Performing Computing, and a Research Fellow at Princeton University. He was Executive Director of the National Higher Education STEM Programme for England and Wales, and in 2016 was commissioned as a Deputy Lieutenant of Merseyside.

Weatherill is a chartered mathematician, a chartered engineer, and a chartered scientist. He is a Fellow of the Royal Aeronautical Society, a Fellow of the Institute of Mathematics, a Fellow of the Royal Academy of Engineering, and a Fellow of the Royal Society of Arts. He is an Honorary Fellow of Swansea University, an Honorary Fellow of the Manufacturing Technology Centre, an Honorary Bencher of Middle Temple, and an Honorary Friend of Liverpool Institute for Performing Arts.

Weatherill's main research interests are high speed compressible flows of relevance to aerospace engineering, as well as aspects of electromagnetism, environmental modelling and bio-engineering. He was part of the team that did the aerodynamic analysis for the Thrust SSC supersonic car. He has had more than 300 publications in journals and conference papers.

He is currently Vice-Chair of Middle Temple's Education and Training Committee; Lay Trustee of ENT UK and Chair of the Finance Committee. Previous voluntary roles include: Chair of the Royal Liverpool Philharmonic Orchestra (2015-2022), Chair of the North West Advisory Board of the Canal & Rivers Trust (North) (2019-2023), Chair of Crimestoppers (Merseyside) (2019-2023), Member of the Arts Council (North) (2015-2022), Trustee of Liverpool Medical Institute (2020-2023), Board Member of Maggie's Cancer Trust (Clatteridge) (2021-2023), Chair of Board of the Liverpool Royal Court Theatre (2018-2022).

== Family and education ==
Nigel Weatherill was born in Cleckheaton, Yorkshire. He is married to his wife Barbara Weatherill. Together they have two children.

He attended Whitcliffe Mount Grammar School. Afterwards he attended the University of Southampton where he obtained an undergraduate degree (First Class Honours) in Mathematics and Aeronautics. He later obtained a Ph.D from the university's department of mathematics for his work on magnetohydrodynamics.

== Career ==
After leaving University, Weatherill joined AWA's research team, developing mathematical models to predict the water quality in rivers and estuaries. He researched compressible high-speed flows in aeronautics.

In 1986, Weatherill became a Research Fellow at the Department of Mechanical and Aerospace Engineering at Princeton University, spending a year in the US.

In 1987, Weatherill was appointed lecturer, and in 1996 appointed Head of Department of Civil Engineering at the University of Swansea. In 2002, he became Pro-Vice-Chancellor (Research) holding the position until 2008.

In 2001, he became Adjunct Professor at the US Nation Science Foundation Engineering Research Centre in Mississippi, spending a year at Mississippi State University.

Between 2008 and 2011 he was Scientist-In-Residence at the Institute for High Performance Computing in Singapore.

In 2008 he moved to the University of Birmingham as Pro-Vice-Chancellor and Head of the College of Engineering and Physical Science. While there, he was the Executive Directory of the National Higher Education STEM Programme for England and Wales - a project aimed at promoting and widening access to Higher Education in STEM disciplines, innovative curriculum development and STEM skills for employment. He was also a member of the founding group of the Manufacturing Technology Centre, now part of the High Value Manufacturing Catapult, and in 2018 was elected an Honorary Fellow of the Manufacturing Technology Centre.

Between 1998 and 2011 he was Co-Editor-In-Chief of the International Journal for Numerical Methods in Fluids, published by Wiley.

In September 2011, Weatherill was appointed Vice-Chancellor and Chief Executive Officer of Liverpool John Moores University (LJMU). During this time he held additional honorary positions: an Honorary Colonel of the Liverpool University Officer Training Corps (2013 to 2018), Honorary Member of the Liverpool Medical Institute (2017), Honorary Friend of Liverpool Institute for Performing Arts (2018), Honorary Fellow of the Manufacturing Technology Centre (2018), Board of the John Moores Liverpool Exhibition Trust, Board of the Liverpool Local Enterprise Partnership, and Board of the CBI North West. In 2014 he was appointed to chair the Mayoral Commission on Environmental Sustainability by the Elected Mayor of Liverpool.

In 2018, both Weatherill and LJMU's finance director resigned abruptly in controversial circumstances, the University declining to comment on the factors behind these two precipitous departures.

== Honors and awards ==
- Honorary Colonel, Liverpool Universities Officer Training Corp (2013 - 2018)
- Deputy Lieutenant of Merseyside (2016)
- Maritime Ambassador's Award, Mersey Maritime (2018)
- Honorary Friend, Liverpool Institute for Performing Arts (2018)
- Crimestoppers – Committee of the Year (2021)

Academic offices
Preceded by Michael Brown	Vice-Chancellor of Liverpool John Moores University; 2011–2018	Succeeded by Mark Power
