= Paul Whitaker =

English cricketer

Personal information
- Full name: Paul Robert Whitaker
- Born: 28 June 1973 (age 53); Keighley, Yorkshire, England
- Nickname: The Spin Doctor
- Height: 5 ft 1 in (1.55 m)
- Batting: Left-handed
- Bowling: Right-arm off-break

Domestic team information
- Years: Team
- 1994–1998: Hampshire
- 1995/96: Central Districts

Career statistics
Competition	First-class	List A
Matches	37	60
Runs scored	1,734	866
Batting average	30.42	17.67
100s/50s	1/11	0/4
Top score	119	97
Balls bowled	955	980
Wickets	13	24
Bowling average	43.15	31.20
5 wickets in innings	0	0
10 wickets in match	0	0
Best bowling	3/36	3/44
Catches/stumpings	15/–	13/–
- Source: Cricinfo, 8 December 2009

Paul Robert Whitaker (born 28 June 1973) is a former English cricketer who played in England for Hampshire County Cricket Club and briefly in New Zealand for Central Districts.

== Cricket career ==
Whitaker was born in June 1973 at Keighley, Yorkshire. He was educated at Grange Middle School and Whitcliffe Mount School. Whitaker played his early county cricket at Derbyshire, but was unable to force his way into their starting eleven and was released at the end of the 1993 season. He subsequently wrote to Hampshire seeking to secure a new contract, which he was successful in doing. After scoring heavily in Second XI cricket, Whitaker made his debut in first-class cricket for Hampshire against Leicestershire at Leicester in the 1994 County Championship. He had a successful debut, scoring 94 in Hampshire's first innings opening the batting alongside Paul Terry. His innings was described by Derek Pringle as "looking assured in defence" and that "he displayed a decent array of shots". Alongside a further appearance in the County Championship, Whitaker also made his debut in List A one-day cricket during the 1994 season, playing two matches in the 1994 Axa Equity & Law League. He established himself in the Hampshire side during the 1995 season, making thirteen first-class and fourteen one-day appearances. Whitaker scored what would be his only first-class century during this season, with a score of 119 against Worcestershire, which helped to enable a declaration after Mark Nicholas had also made 138 not out.

During the winter which followed the 1995 season, Whitaker played cricket in New Zealand, where he made six one-day appearances for Central Districts in the 1995–96 Shell Cup. After a similar number of first-class appearances in the 1996 season, as well as twenty one-day appearances, Whitaker's appearances for Hampshire became less in their regularity. Having made infrequent appearances during the 1997 and 1998 season, he was released alongside Richard Dibden. In 37 first-class matches for Hampshire, he scored 1,734 runs at an average of 30.42, making eleven half centuries alongside his solitary century. With the ball, he took 13 wickets with best figures of 3 for 36. In one-day cricket, he made 54 appearances for Hampshire and scored 757 runs at an average of 17.60; he made three half centuries, with a highest score of 97. For Central Districts, he scored 109 runs and made one half century. With the ball, he took 18 wickets for Hampshire and 6 for Central Districts in one-day cricket. Following his retirement from cricket, Whitaker emigrated to New Zealand.
