= Chancellor of Liverpool John Moores University =

Titular head of Liverpool John Moores University

- Incumbent; Nisha Katona since 1 January 2022
- Style: Chancellor
- Appointer: Board of governors
- Term length: 5 years
- Inaugural holder: Henry Egerton Cotton
- Formation: 1992
- Deputy: Pro-Chancellor of Liverpool John Moores University

The Chancellor of Liverpool John Moores University is the titular head of the university who is appointed on the approval of the board of governors. The duties of the chancellor include the conferring of degrees at graduation ceremonies and being an ambassador for the university both nationally and internationally. As chancellor they may also attend engagements at the university and outside promoting its work and research.

== History ==
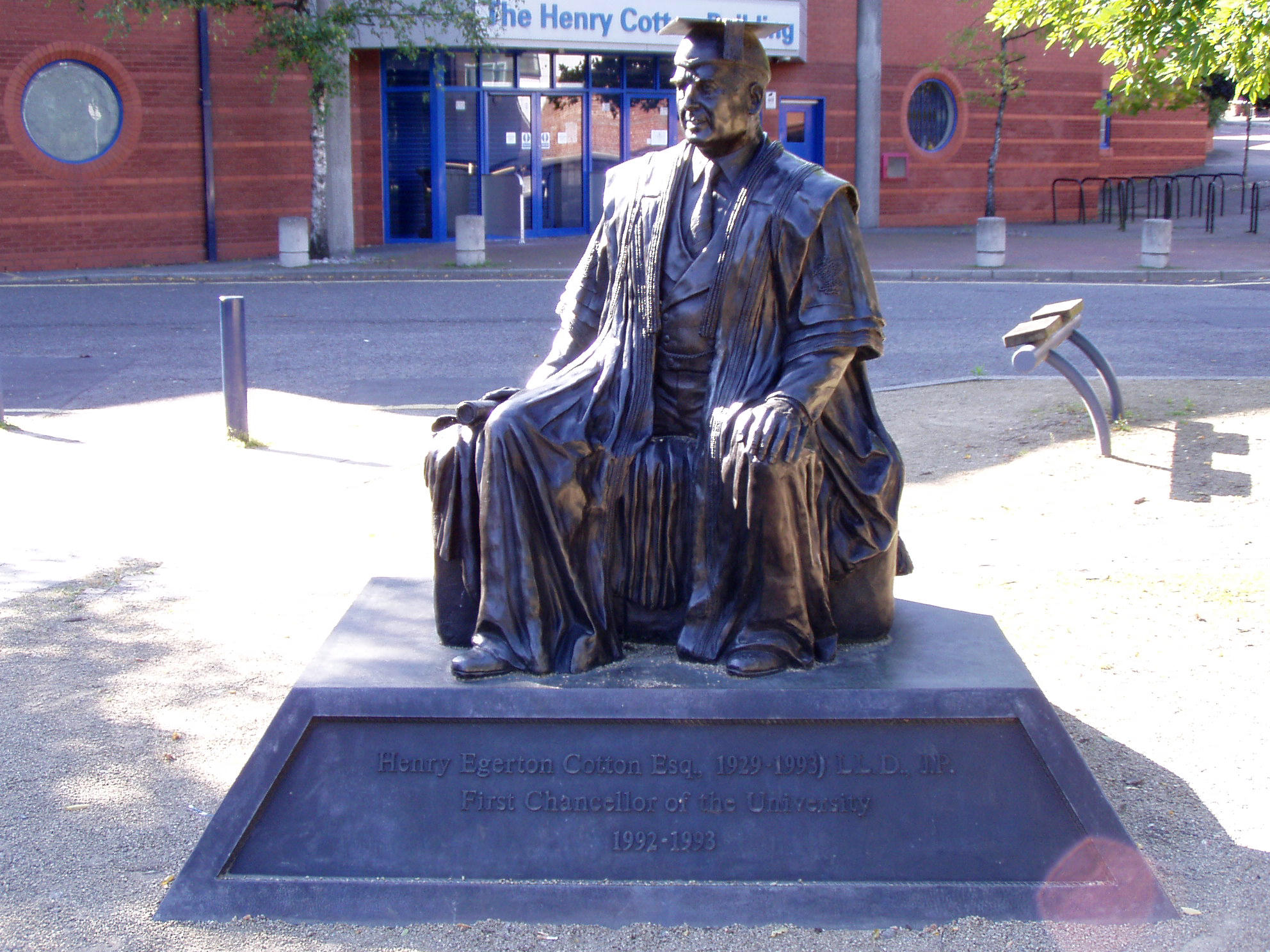
Statue of Henry Egerton Cotton, First Chancellor of the university (1992–1993)

The Office of the Chancellor was formed in 1992, when Henry Egerton Cotton], who served as Lord Lieutenant of Merseyside was appointed as the first chancellor, following the university's creation as a new generation university from being a polytechnic. However the institution itself goes as far back to its foundation as Liverpool Mechanics' School of Arts in 1823, making its claim in the third oldest university in England debate. In 1994, John Moores, Jr, who was the eldest son of Sir John Moores whom the university is named after, and who served as chair of governors, was appointed second chancellor until the end of his term in 1999. It is a non-residential appointment. The leadership and everyday running of the university is installed in the Vice-Chancellor, who is the chief executive. During the absence of the chancellor or vacant office, the duties are often undertaken by the Pro-Chancellor, who is also the chairman of the board of governors. Upon completing the term of office or stepping down, the holder is appointed Chancellor Emeritus of the university, retaining an informal ambassadorial position.

A statue of Henry Cotton resides on the universities City Campus, outside the Henry Cotton Building in Liverpool. The building currently houses the Faculty of Health and Applied Social Sciences, and the School of the Built Environment.

Dr. Brian May, became the fourth chancellor after being appointed to the honorary position on 14 April 2008 in a ceremony at St George's Hall, Liverpool. He is most known for being in the rock band Queen. He completed his PhD in 2007 "A Survey of Radial Velocities in the Zodiacal Dust Cloud", using the university owned telescope to complete it. He is also co-author of the book: "Bang! The complete history of the universe" with Sir Patrick Moore who attended May's inauguration ceremony and Chris Lintott. Brian May replaced Cherie Blair, wife of former Prime Minister Tony Blair, who stepped down from the office in 2006. Brian May himself stepped down at the end of his five-year term in 2013.

At the end of March 2013, Sir Brian Leveson, the Lord Justice of Appeal for England and Wales took over the chancellors office following the term end of Brian May. His official inauguration ceremony took place at the Liverpool Anglican Cathedral on the afternoon of 20 May 2013.

== List of chancellors ==
| No. | Chancellor | Took office | Left office |
|---|---|---|---|
| 1 | Henry E. Cotton, | 1992 | 1993 |
| 2 | John Moores, Jr, | 1994 | 1999 |
| 3 | Cherie Blair, | 1999 | 2006 |
| 4 | Brian May | 2008 | 2013 |
| 5 | Sir Brian Leveson | 2013 | 2022 |
| 6 | Nisha Katona | 2022 | present |

== See also ==
- Vice-Chancellor of Liverpool John Moores University
- Liverpool John Moores University
