= Lord-Lieutenant of Merseyside =

British noble title

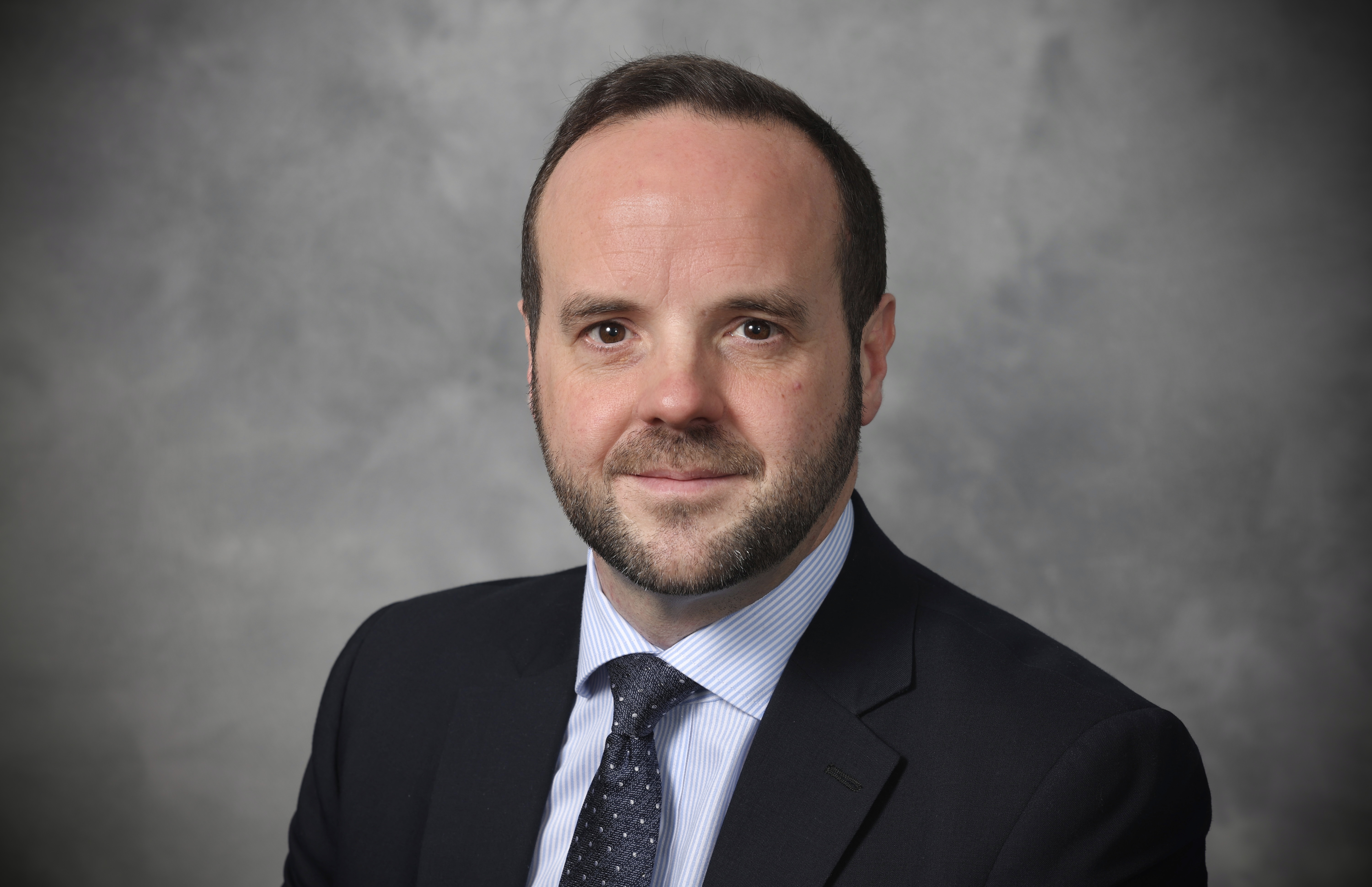
Peter Oliver OBE HM Lord-Lieutenant of Merseyside, 16 December 2025 to present.

Flag of a Lord-Lieutenant

The office of Lord-Lieutenant of Merseyside was created on 1 April 1974, taking over some duties from the Lord Lieutenant of Lancashire and Lord Lieutenant of Cheshire. As Merseyside (north of the River Mersey and parts of The Wirral) remains part of the Lancashire County Palatine, the Lord Lieutenant is appointed by the monarch in their capacity as Duke of Lancaster. The Lieutenancy area was created on the 1 April 1974, upon the creation of Merseyside itself.

No.	Lord-Lieutenant	From	Until
1	Brigadier Sir Douglas Crawford	1 April 1974	
2	Wing Cdr Sir Kenneth Stoddart	1979	1989
3	Henry Egerton Cotton	5 June 1989	1992
4	Sir Alan William Waterworth	22 November 1993	2006
5	Dame Lorna Muirhead	11 October 2006	2017
6	Mark Blundell	13 September 2017	15 December 2025
7	Peter Oliver	16 December 2025	

== Current Deputy Lieutenants ==
The county's current deputy lieutenants are:

- Professor Denise Barrett-Baxendale
- Sir Michael J. Bibby
- Michael P. Braham
- Zia U. Chaudry
- Andrew J. Cooke
- Captain Hugh B. Daglish
- Lady Marina Dalglish
- Edward Stanley, 19th Earl of Derby
- Claire F. Dove
- Paige Earlam
- Canon Ruth Fabby
- John Flamson
- Judith L. Greensmith
- Colonel Charles T. Hillock
- Ruth Hussey
- Elaine Inglesbey-Burke
- Nicholas Jedynakiewicz
- Nigel Lanceley
- Stephen Maddox
- Lesley Martin-Wright
- Ian S. Meadows
- Anne P. Morris
- Professor Sir Jonathan Murphy
- Professor Sir Howard Newby
- Peter Oliver
- Robert T.H. Owen
- Dr Roger N. Phillips
- Professor Gerald Pillay
- John Roberts
- Rebecca Ross-Williams
- David Steer
- Max Steinberg
- Professor Ian Tracey
- Colonel Mark Underhill
- Nicholas A. Wainwright
- Professor Nigel Weatherill
- Allan Williams
- Brian Wong
- Peter Woods
- Stephen Yip

=== Former ===
Former Deputy Lieutenants have included:

- Brigadier Selwyn Lloyd
- Lieutenant Colonel and Brevet Colonel Alan S. Eccles
- Lieutenant Colonel Charles H. Elston
- Major Henry B. Chrimes
- Air Commodore Jack Broughton
- Richard A. Foster
- William D. Fulton
- Professor Philip N. Love
- Harry Rimmer
- Sir James Sharples
- Anthony W. Shone
- Colonel Martin G.C. Amlôt
- Angela A. Jones
- Dr John E. Roberts
- John N. Rushbrooke
- Pauline L. Burrows
- Alan J. Chic
- Sir David C. Clarke
- Frank Field, Baron Field of Birkenhead
- John R. Flamson
- Stephen B. L. Yip
- Wally Brown
- Professor Michael Brown
- James C.M. Davies
- Professor Sir Ian Gilmore
- Professor Sir Mark Hedley
- Roger Morris
- Edward Perry
- Abila Pointing
