= Vice-Chancellor of Liverpool John Moores University =

- Incumbent; Prof. Mark Power since 2021
- Style: Vice-Chancellor
- Appointer: Board of Governors
- Inaugural holder: Prof. Peter Toyne
- Formation: 1992

The Vice-Chancellor and Chief Executive of Liverpool John Moores University is the main academic officer and administrator of the university in its everyday functioning. As well as administration, the vice-chancellor represents the university within the United Kingdom and abroad, ensures and takes leadership in maintaining the university's aims, as well as performing some ceremonial duties when needed. Appointment to the position is by vote of the university's board of governors, of which the vice-chancellor is an ex officio member.

The office of the vice-chancellor was created in 1992 when Professor Peter Toyne was appointed as the first vice-chancellor, following the creation of the new generation university from being a polytechnic. The vice-chancellor is assisted by Pro-Vice-Chancellors who take on some responsibility. The Executive Office of the Vice-Chancellor and executive offices of the pro-vice-chancellors are located at Egerton Court in Liverpool.

From 2011 to 2018, Professor Nigel Weatherill was the third vice-chancellor. After his abrupt departure, the THES reported that LJMU had declined to comment on factors behind the sudden departures of Weatherill and the university's finance director.

From 2018 Professor Mark Power acted as Interim chief-executive until Professor Ian Campbell was appointed Vice-Chancellor in 2019. In August 2021 Campbell stood down as Vice Chancellor with immediate effect with Power being appointed Interim VC.

== List of vice-chancellors ==
| No. | Image | Vice-Chancellor | Took office | Left office |
|---|---|---|---|---|
| 1 | | Prof. Peter Toyne | 1992 | 2000 |
| 2 | | Prof. Michael Brown | 2001 | 2011 |
| 3 | | Prof. Nigel Weatherill | 2011 | 2018 |
| 4 | | Mark Power (Interim) | 2018 | 2019 |
| 5 | | Prof. Ian Campbell | 2019 | 2021 |
| 6 | | Prof. Mark Power | 2021 | |

== See also ==
- Chancellor of Liverpool John Moores University
- Pro-Chancellor of Liverpool John Moores University
- Liverpool John Moores University
