= Cherie Blair =

British barrister (born 1954)

Cherie Blair CBE KC
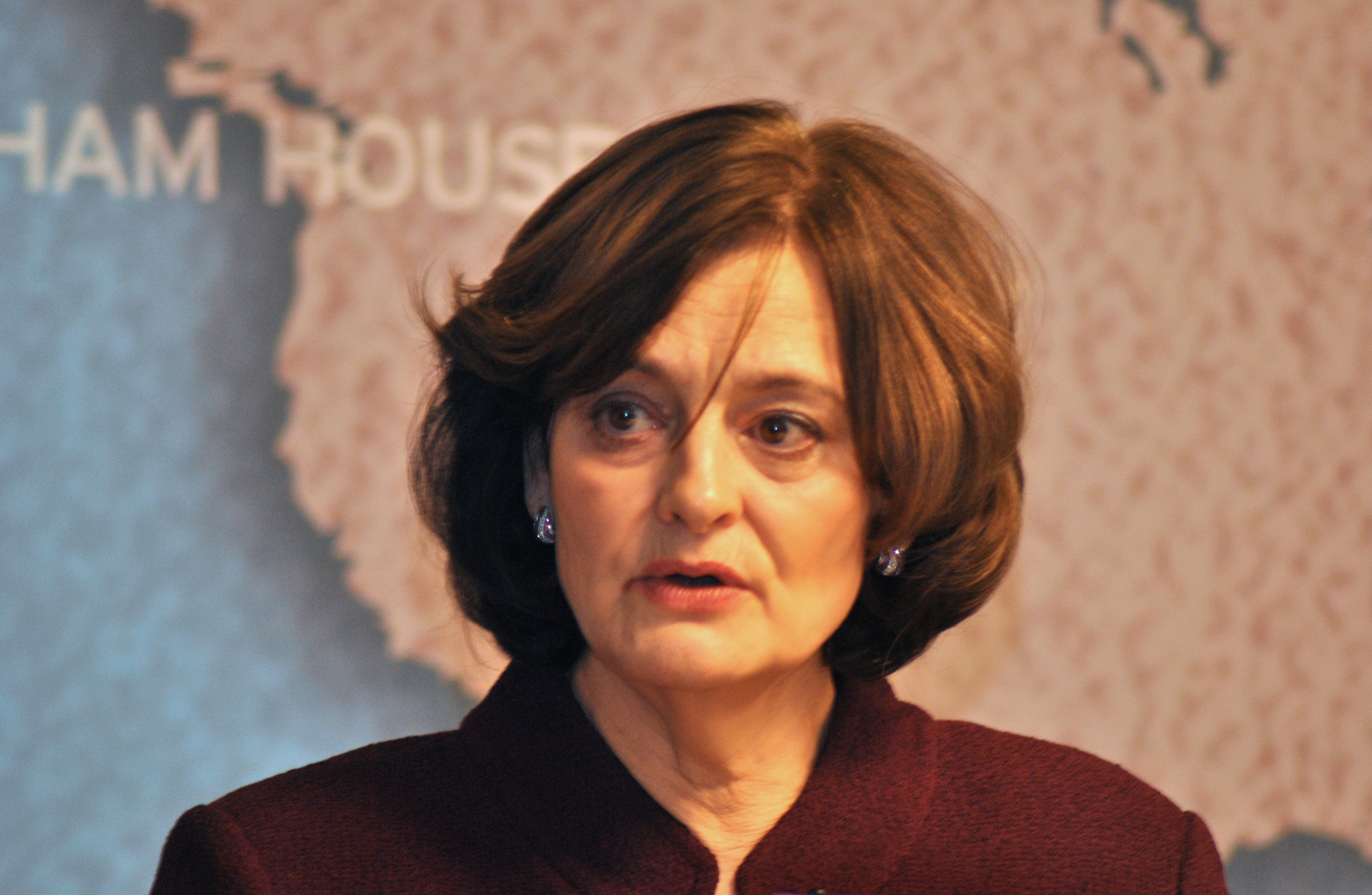
- Blair in 2011
- Born: Cherie Booth; 23 September 1954 (age 72); Bury, Lancashire, England
- Education: London School of Economics; University of Law
- Occupation: Barrister
- Known for: Spouse of the prime minister of the United Kingdom (1997–2007)
- Political party: Labour
- Spouse: Tony Blair (m. 1980)
- Children: 4, including Euan and Nicky
- Parent(s): Tony Booth (father); Gale Booth (mother); Pat Phoenix (stepmother)
- Relatives: Lauren Booth (paternal half‑sister)
- Website: cherieblair.org

Cherie, Lady Blair (née Booth; born 23 September 1954) is an English barrister, judge, and writer. Blair has appeared in a number of leading cases, including arguing Lisa Grant v South West Trains Ltd before the European Court of Justice. In June 1999, she was appointed a recorder or part-time judge. Blair was the third Chancellor of Liverpool John Moores University from 1999 to 2006. She is also Governor of the London School of Economics and the Open University. Blair was appointed a Commander of the Order of the British Empire (CBE) in the 2013 New Year Honours for services to women and charity.

She is also the spouse of Tony Blair, the former British prime minister. Her father was the actor, Tony Booth.

== Early life and education ==
Booth was born on 23 September 1954 at Fairfield General Hospital, Bury, Lancashire (now part of Greater Manchester), England, and brought up in Ferndale Road, Waterloo, Lancashire (now part of Merseyside), just north of Liverpool. Although her birth was registered as 'Cherie', owing to her maternal grandmother's influence, she was christened 'Theresa Cara' in deference to the requirement that she be given a saint's name. Her father, British actor Tony Booth, left her mother, actress Gale Howard (née Joyce Smith; 14 February 1933 – 5 June 2016), when Cherie was 8 years old. Cherie and her younger sister Lyndsey were then brought up by Gale and their paternal grandmother Vera Booth, a devout Roman Catholic of Irish descent. The sisters attended Catholic schools in Crosby, Lancashire. Cherie Booth attended Seafield Convent Grammar, which is now part of Sacred Heart Catholic College, where she achieved four As in her A Levels.

She read law at the London School of Economics and graduated with first-class honours. Later she was enrolled at the College of Law and passed her Bar Vocational Course. She came at the top of her year in the bar exams, while teaching law at the Polytechnic of Central London (University of Westminster). She was the Labour candidate for the Conservative safe seat of North Thanet in Kent in the 1983 general election, losing to Roger Gale.

== Legal career ==
A member of Lincoln's Inn, she became a barrister in 1976 and Queen's Counsel in 1995. Until 1988, her head of chambers was George Carman. In 1999, she was appointed a recorder (a permanent part-time judge) in the County Court and Crown Court.

She was a founding member of Matrix Chambers in London but no longer practises there. Matrix was formed in 2000 specialising in human rights law, though members also practise in a range of areas of UK public and private law, the Law of the European Union and European Convention on Human Rights, in addition to public international law. She is Founder and chair of law firm Omnia Strategy LLP. She specialises in employment, discrimination, as well as public law; in this capacity, she has occasionally represented claimants taking cases against the UK Government.

Blair has appeared in a number of leading cases. A notable example, Lisa Grant v South West Trains Ltd, before the European Court of Justice concerned discrimination on the grounds of sexual orientation.

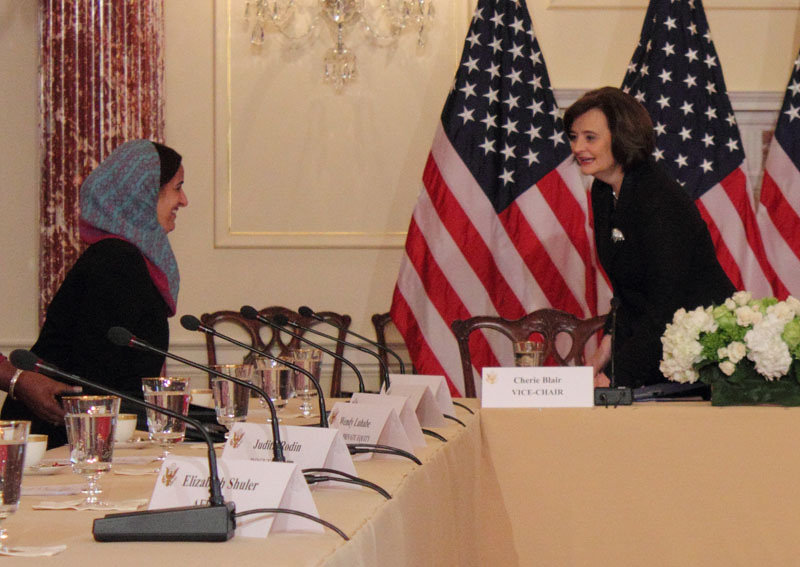
Blair with Emirati politician Lubna Khalid Al Qasimi in 2011

In January 2010, when sentencing a defendant, Shamso Miah, for assault, Blair announced that she would suspend his prison sentence after describing him as a "religious man". The court heard that Miah had been to a mosque shortly before he broke a man's jaw following a row in a bank queue. Blair told Miah: "You are a religious man and you know this is not acceptable behaviour." This was interpreted by some observers as special leniency given on account of the criminal's religiosity. The Office for Judicial Complaints released an initial statement saying they had "received a number of complaints in relation to the comments" that Blair had made when sentencing Shamso Miah and that the matter was under investigation. On 10 June 2010, the OJC released a statement saying that the investigation had "found that Recorder Booth's observations did not constitute judicial misconduct" and accordingly "no disciplinary action is necessary". A private letter to the National Secular Society said, however, that the OJC had taken action in the form of "informal advice" from a more senior judge.

In 2015, Blair defended Rwandan spy chief Emmanuel Karenzi Karake against accusations that he had conspired to murder three Spanish NGO workers and a Canadian priest. Karake had allegedly done so because the workers knew about the Rwandan Patriotic Front killing Hutu civilians in the Democratic Republic of the Congo.

Blair launched a company called Mee Healthcare with an American business partner Gail Lese in 2011. In June 2015, it ceased trading and all staff were dismissed without notice.

In 2021, Blair worked as an ethics adviser for Israeli security firm NSO Group.

== Career in academia ==
Blair was the third Chancellor of Liverpool John Moores University from 1999 to 2006. On 26 July 2006, she was awarded the honorary title of Emerita Chancellor, as well as the university honorarily naming its new Cherie Booth Building. She is also Governor of the London School of Economics and the Open University. On 2 March 2011, Blair was appointed the Chancellor of the Asian University for Women.

Blair is regularly invited to speak at legal and leadership conferences, and has in the past participated in the World Law Forum, ET Women's Forum, Yidan Prize Summit and the Commonwealth Africa Summit, amongst others.

== Honours and charity work ==
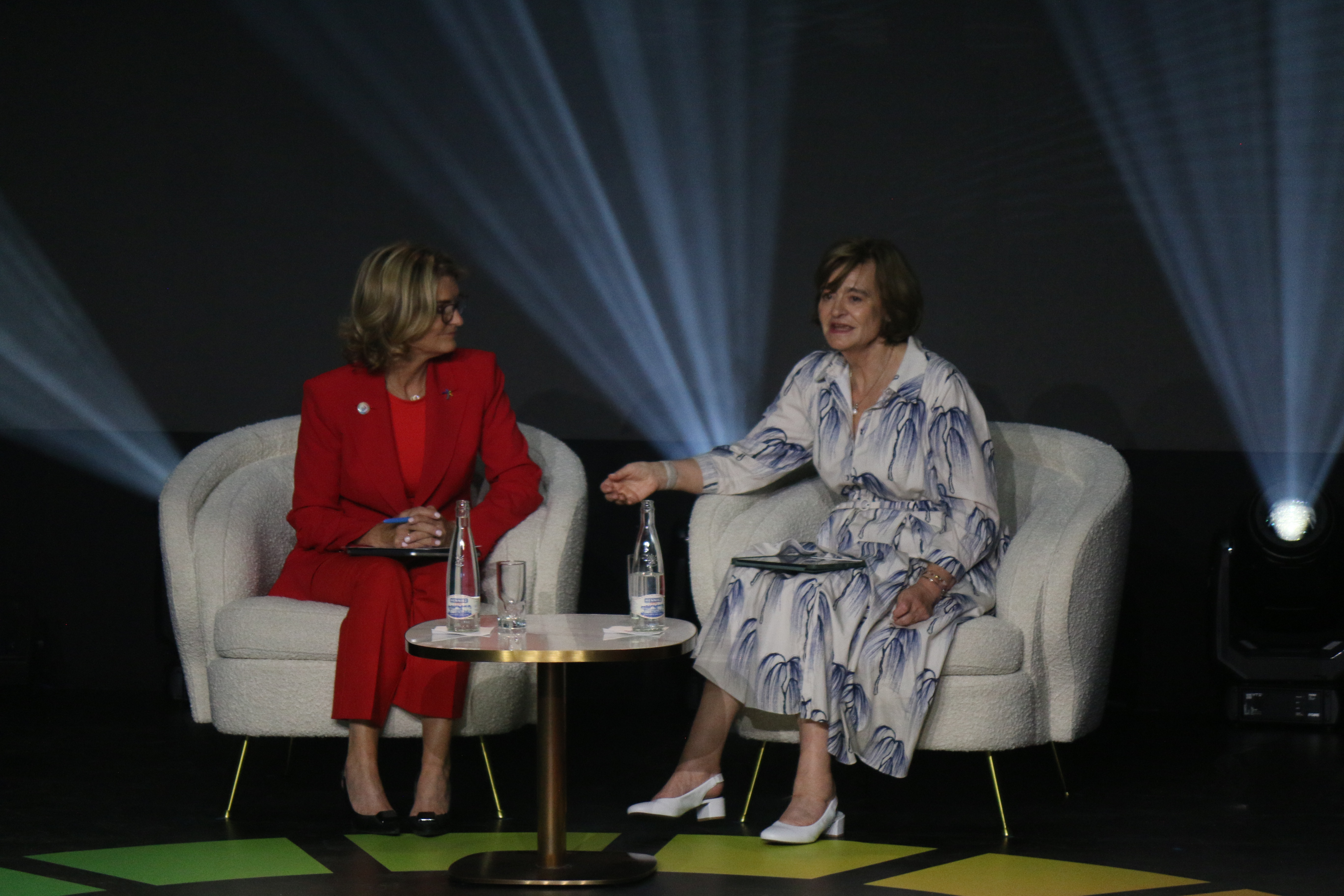
Blair (right) at 2025 AI for Good Summit in Geneva

In July 1999, Blair was awarded the honorary degree of Doctor of the University (DUniv) from the Open University. Blair is a patron of Breast Cancer Care, a UK breast cancer information and support charity, Jospice, the international hospice organisation based in her home town of Crosby, and disability charity Scope. She is also involved with the British branch of Child in Need India (CINI UK), and is the organisation's patron.

In 2008, she launched her foundation, the Cherie Blair Foundation for Women, a development organisation that aims to support women entrepreneurs in developing countries. "Our mission is to provide women with the skills, technology, networks and access to capital that they need to become successful small and growing business owners, so that they can contribute to their economies and have a stronger voice in their societies," says its mission statement.

In 2010, Blair spoke at WE Day, an event held by WE Charity as part of their ongoing effort to empower youth and encourage them to get involved in their communities.

Also in 2010, Blair founded the Africa Justice Foundation alongside barristers Suella Braverman and Philip Riches.

She was appointed Commander of the Order of the British Empire (CBE) in the 2013 New Year Honours for services to women's issues and charity.

In June 2018, "Cherie Blair Foundation for Women" was inducted into Power Brands LIFE – Hall of Fame at the London International Forum for Equality.

== Controversies ==
In 2002, Blair purchased two flats in Bristol with the assistance, it was alleged but later denied, of Peter Foster, a convicted Australian conman and boyfriend of Blair's friend Carole Caplin, who negotiated a discount for Blair. Blair publicly apologised for her embarrassing connection to Foster, stating "I did not think it was my business to choose my friends' friends".

Her relationship with Caplin gave rise to headlines in some newspapers, as Caplin is credited with introducing Blair to various New Age symbols and beliefs. Reports of Blair's New Age practices included an account of her 2001 holiday in Mexico, when she and her husband, wearing only swimming costumes, privately took part in a rebirthing procedure that involved smearing mud and fruit over each other's bodies while sitting in a steam bath.

In 2002, she apologised after saying within hours of a Jerusalem blast that killed at least 19 people in reference to the Palestinian suicide bombers: "As long as young people feel they have no hope but to blow themselves up, we're never going to make progress, are we?"

On 12 December 2008, Blair gave a lecture alternatively entitled "The Church and Women's Rights: time for a fresh perspective?" or "Religion as a Force in protecting Women's Human Rights" at the Pontifical University of Saint Thomas Aquinas, Angelicum, in Rome.

In summer 2015, in the wake of the Hillary Clinton email controversy, Blair was revealed by The Guardian to have lobbied Clinton in 2009 on behalf of prominent members of the Qatari monarchy; Clinton was US Secretary of State at the time. In a letter to the newspaper, Blair denied this characterisation of her mediation efforts, describing their story as "sensationalist and inaccurate". Precisely two months later, the release of another batch of Clinton's private emails confirmed that Blair had, indeed, arranged meetings with Clinton for the Qataris outside normal diplomatic channels, with discussions to involve "the US/Qatar relationship generally", not merely joint philanthropic efforts. In one case, Blair herself stated that her purpose was to help the eldest of Sheikha Mosah's sons, Jassim bin Hamad bin Khalifa Al Thani, "build up an international profile".

In summer 2015, Blair's law firm accepted a large fee to advise the Maldives government as it faced a challenge from former Maldivian president Mohamed Nasheed over his imprisonment for "terrorism". Nasheed, who served from 2008 to 2012 as his country's first democratically elected leader, had received a 13-year prison sentence after a widely criticised trial.

== Personal life ==
=== Family ===
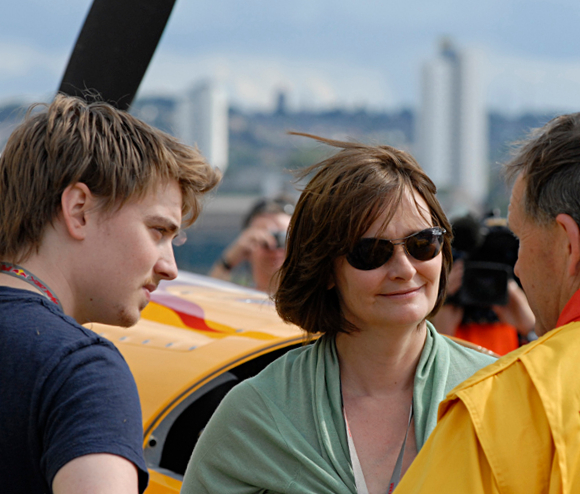
Euan and Cherie Blair at the Red Bull Air Race in 2007 in London

In 1976, while she was studying to become a barrister, she met future prime minister and husband Tony Blair. She obtained a pupillage in the chambers of Derry Irvine ahead of him; he was also taken on. Married on 31 March 1980, the Blairs have three sons and one daughter: Euan (born 1984), Nicholas (born 1985), Kathryn (born 1988), and Leo (born 2000).

Leo was the first child born to the wife of a serving British prime minister in over 150 years, since Rollo Russell was born to Lady Frances Elliot-Murray-Kynynmound and Lord John Russell on 11 July 1849. Another pregnancy at the age of 47 ended in miscarriage in early August 2002. The Blair children attended Catholic secondary schools, including The London Oratory School. All four children have Irish passports, by virtue of Tony Blair's mother, Hazel Elizabeth Corscadden, a Protestant, the daughter of George Corscadden, a butcher and Orangeman who moved to Glasgow in 1916 but returned to Ballyshannon in 1923, where Hazel was born to George and Sarah Margaret (née Lipsett), above her family's grocery shop. Via her father, Blair and her younger sister Lyndsey have six half-sisters, including British journalist Lauren Booth.

Her first grandchild (a girl) was born in October 2016.

=== Political and religious views ===
Blair has described herself as a socialist and, at times, has appeared to have views further to the left than those of her husband. She is a republican and reportedly chooses to handshake rather than curtsy when meeting royals, including Elizabeth II. According to the royal historian Carolyn Harris, Blair's preference for a handshake "attracted controversy as it was seen as making a statement about her republican views". Elizabeth herself was said to take amusement from Blair's refusal to curtsey and has been quoted as stating "I can almost feel Mrs Blair's knees stiffening when I come into the room".

In March 2008, Blair chaired the Street Weapons Commission on behalf of the broadcaster Channel 4. She toured the UK and took evidence from people affected by street crime and published a report and practical advice in June 2008.

She is a practising Roman Catholic. In 2009, Blair urged the Catholic Church to reconsider its opposition to contraception, suggesting it could be holding some women back from pursuing a career.

In George W. Bush's 2010 autobiography Decision Points, Blair is briefly described as a fierce opponent of the death penalty.

== Writings, portrayals, and coverage in books, film and theatre ==
Blair co-authored, with Cate Haste, the 2004 book The Goldfish Bowl: Married to the Prime Minister. The book is a compilation history of the lives of spouses of British prime ministers for most of the second half of the 20th century. It covers the spouses of former prime ministers Anthony Eden, Harold Macmillan, Alec Douglas-Home, Harold Wilson, James Callaghan, Margaret Thatcher, and John Major.

Blair wrote a book of her memoirs, published in late May 2008, entitled Speaking for Myself: The Autobiography, and the book was listed as a Sunday Times best-seller. Interviewed about the book by Carole MacNeil on the Canadian network CBC Television on 1 June 2008, Blair stated that she felt most of the controversy about her in the British media was due to her pioneering role as the first wife of a British prime minister who had her own career, with the media simply not knowing how to treat her fairly and objectively.

Played by Helen McCrory, Blair features as a character in The Queen (2006), starring Helen Mirren, about the aftermath of the death of Diana, Princess of Wales in 1997, and is portrayed as a fierce anti-monarchist. McCrory played her again in the 2010 HBO film The Special Relationship. Blair also features as a character in Chris Bush and Ian McCluskey's production TONY! The Blair Musical. Phoebe Nicholls played her in The Trial of Tony Blair (2007). She was also portrayed in the music video of "Shoot the Dog", a song by George Michael that is critical of Tony Blair and George W. Bush. Blair is portrayed by Lydia Leonard in the fifth and sixth seasons of The Crown.

In June 2019, Blair signed on as an executive producer for Jerusalem-set drama feature film The Rock Pile, a first try into film production for her.

== Recognition ==
She was recognised as one of the BBC's 100 women of 2013. In 2023, she was awarded the 40 over 40 award by Monaco Voice.

== Cited texts ==
- Blair, Cherie (2008). Speaking for Myself: The Autobiography. Little Brown. ISBN 978-1-4087-0098-3.

Unofficial roles
Preceded by Norma Major	Spouse of the Prime Minister of the United Kingdom; 1997–2007	Succeeded by Sarah Jane Brown
Academic offices
Preceded by John Moores Jr.	Chancellor of Liverpool John Moores University; 1999–2007	Succeeded by Brian May
Orders of precedence in the United Kingdom
Preceded by Tessa, Lady Brewer	Wife of a Knight of the Garter	Succeeded by Poppy, Lady Anderson
