= Kenneth Stoddart =

British Royal Air Force officier (1914–2008)

- Born: 26 May 1914; Liverpool, England
- Died: 26 December 2008 (aged 94); Liverpool, England
- Military career
- Allegiance: United Kingdom
- Branch: Royal Air Force
- Service years: 1939–1945
- Rank: Wing commander
- Nickname: Ken
- Unit: No. 611 Squadron RAF
- Conflicts: World War II: Battle of Britain
- Awards: KCVO, KStJ, AE
- Other work: Deputy Lieutenant of Lancashire, High Sheriff of Merseyside, Lord Lieutenant of Merseyside

Wing Commander Sir Kenneth Maxwell Stoddart KCVO AE KStJ JP (26 May 1914 – 26 December 2008) was a distinguished Battle of Britain Pilot.

Kenneth Stoddart was born in Cressington Park, Liverpool, on 26 May 1914. He was educated at Sedbergh School and Clare College, Cambridge. After obtaining his degree he joined the family businesses, Cearns and Brown Ltd and the United Mersey Supply Company, both of which were chandlers and ships' suppliers in the Port of Liverpool.

Stoddart was commissioned as a pilot officer in the Auxiliary Air Force with No. 611 Squadron at Speke on 18 December 1936. He learned to fly in Avro Tutors then graduated to Hawker Harts and later Hinds before converting to the Spitfire Mk I in May 1939. He was at summer camp at RAF Duxford Cambridgeshire when war was declared. By January 1940 he was a flight lieutenant and commanded 'B' Flight at Digby.

He took part in operations over the Dunkirk evacuation in June 1940. Stoddart was flying Spitfire I N3058 when he was hit by a cannon shell in the fuselage just behind his seat, which tore a large hole in the side of the fuselage and blew the canopy off. The armour plating was hit and control cables were almost severed. However, F/L Stoddart managed to force land at Martlesham Heath.

He flew with the squadron during the Battle of Britain. No. 611 was held in reserve for much of the Battle of Britain but saw finally action on 11 September when Stoddart attacked a Bf 109 at long range, firing 1,784 rounds without observed result. He made no claims with 611 Squadron.

He was seen as:

a glamorous figure with an aquiline nose, whose insouciant manner and casual references to "prangs" and drinking Pimms, while waiting for comrades to return, masked his true heroism and steely resolve.

He was promoted to the rank of squadron leader on 1 January 1944.

After leaving the RAF, Stoddart became a public servant. He became a deputy lieutenant of Lancashire in 1958, and was appointed High Sheriff of Merseyside from 1974 to 1975. From 1979 to 1989, he was Lord Lieutenant of Merseyside. He retained links with the RAF by becoming Wing President of the Merseyside Air Cadet Organisation.

In 1940, he married Jean Young (appointed OBE, 2015) and they had two daughters, Jennifer and Charlotte.

A memorial service for Sir Kenneth was held at Liverpool Cathedral at noon on 12 February 2009.

== Links ==
- Letter from George Edwards, Former Officer Commanding 7F (1st City of Liverpool) Air Cadets & former chair of the Liverpool Duke of Edinburgh’s Award Advisory Committee in Liverpool Daily Post
- Gazette Entries
- Details of Photographs
- 3wallasey.boys-brigade.org.uk
