= Alan William Waterworth =

British businessman and public administrator

Sir Alan William Waterworth, KCVO (1931–2016) was a British businessman and public administrator.

Born on 22 September 1931, Waterworth attended Trinity College, Cambridge, and graduated in 1954. the same year he became a director of Waterworth Bros. Ltd; he subsequently served as managing director and chairman, before leaving the company in 1969.

Waterworth held a range of public offices. Among other appointments, he was a Commissioner for Inland Revenue from 1965 to 1972, sat on Skelmersdale Development Corporation in the 1970s and early 1980s, and spent eight years on the Merseyside Police Authority (1984–92). He was appointed a deputy lieutenant for Merseyside in 1986; he was made Vice Lord Lieutenant three years later, and then served as Lord Lieutenant of Merseyside from 1993 to 2006. He was also High Sheriff for the 1992–93 year.

Waterworth received an honorary doctorate from the University of Liverpool in 2001 and was appointed a Knight Commander of the Royal Victorian Order six years later, after retiring as Lord Lieutenant. He died on 18 February 2016.
