= Saiphin Moore =

Thai chef and restaurateur

- สายพิณ มอร์
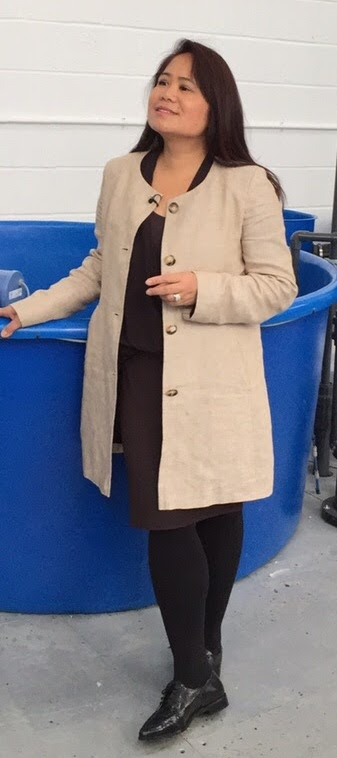
- Moore in 2014
- Born: 1967 or 1968 (age 58–59); Khao Kho, Phetchabun, Thailand
- Culinary career
- Cooking style: Thai and Lao cuisine
- Current restaurants: Rosa's Thai Cafe; Lao Cafe; Saiphin's Thai Kitchen; Slurp Noodles; Dang's
- Previous restaurants: TukTuk Thai; Andina; Ceviche

Saiphin Moore (Thai: สายพิณ มอร์; born 1967/1968) is a Thai chef, restaurateur, and author. She is best known for founding the restaurant chains Rosa's Thai Cafe and Lao Cafe.

== Career ==
Saiphin Moore was born and raised in the northern mountainous area of Khao Kho district in Phetchabun province, Thailand. She was taught to cook by her mother and aunts. She was brought up on a vegetable farm, which did not have electricity until she was 13 years old. She opened a noodle shop in Phetchabun at the age of 14. She then moved to Hong Kong at 18 to work as a nanny, and began cooking for her employer. This started to grow, with other families in the apartment block ordering food from her. She then opened a Thai grocery store which also provided takeaway food.

Saiphin sold the business, and moved to Jersey where some of her family lived. She continued to cook Thai food, but only for friends, travelling to London to get supplies. Saiphin returned to Hong Kong. Saiphin decided to open a Thai takeaway whilst her partner was working at a marketing agency, this then grew into her first restaurant, TukTuk Thai.

Saiphin then moved to London in 2006. she opened a stall on the weekends in Brick Lane, selling Thai food, while she ran a catering business out of her home during the week. In 2008, she opened a restaurant, Rosa's Thai Cafe, on Hanbury Street, Spitalfields. The restaurant was named after the former business at the location, it was a greasy spoon café named Rosa's. This proved successful and grew into a chain of restaurants across London, as well as a cook book based on the menu served there. They also opened Lao Cafe in Covent Garden, serving Lao cuisine.

By this time, there were already eight Rosa's locations within London, as well as a specific kitchen only operating a delivery service through Deliveroo in Battersea which is now no longer running.

Saiphin currently has 2 published cookbooks based on the menu she created at Rosa's Thai Cafe, one of the cookbooks focusing purely on vegetarian Thai food.

As of 2020, Rosa's operates 18 sites across the United Kingdom.

Other than Rosa's Thai Cafe, Saiphin Moore acquired her first non-Thai Chain in December 2020, the Andina & Ceviche branded restaurant group based in London, saving it from administration.

Saiphin, continuing her culinary journey, launched a new noodle concept in London under the name "Slurp," with three branches located in Wapping, Spitalfields, and Soho. She also expanded her offerings by opening a fried chicken spot called "Dang's" under the Slurp Noodles restaurant in Spitalfields.
