= John Moores (British businessman) =

English businessman and philanthropist (1896–1993)

Sir John Moores CBE
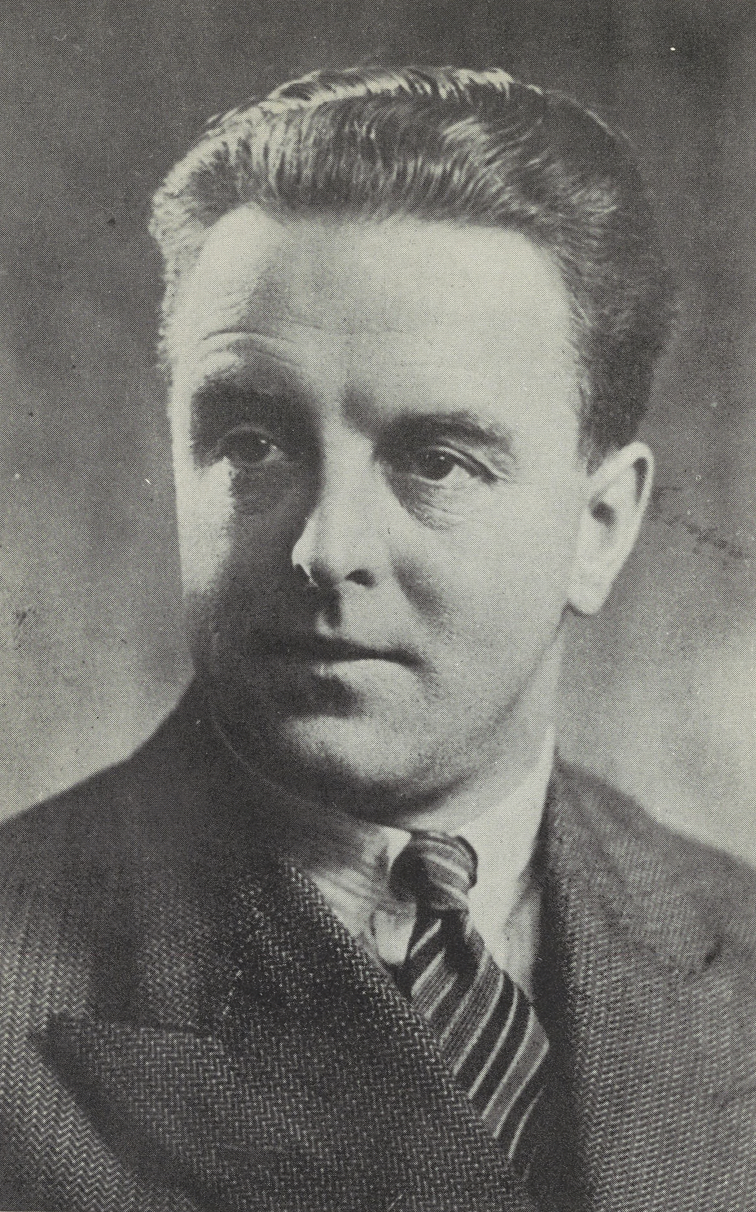
- Born: 25 January 1896; Barton-upon-Irwell, Lancashire, England
- Died: 25 September 1993 (aged 97); Freshfield, Merseyside, England
- Occupations: Telegraphist, later businessman
- Known for: Founder of Littlewoods, chairman of Everton F.C.

Sir John Moores CBE (25 January 1896 – 25 September 1993) was an English businessman, telegraphist, football club owner, politician and philanthropist, most famous for the founding of the now defunct Littlewoods retail and football pools company. Liverpool John Moores University is named in his honour.

Moores' football-betting empire and Littlewoods stores made him one of Britain's richest men.

== Early years ==
John Moores was born at the Church Inn, Eccles, Lancashire, on Saturday, 25 January, 1896. He was the second of eight children and the eldest of four sons born to bricklayer John William Moores (17 September 1871 – 9 February 1919) and Louisa Moores (née Fethney) (9 March 1873 – 13 December 1959). John came from a line of bricklayers, his great-grandfather Sidney Moores was one (1818–1884), as was his grandfather John Moores (1847–1910), though he eventually set up a small building contractors business, and was landlord of the Church Inn where the future owner of Littlewoods was born.

John William Moores later became a site foreman. He was a hard worker but developed a drink problem. In 1918 he developed tuberculosis and died of the illness in 1919 aged 47.

At the age of 12, John got his first job, helping with a milk round before school started. He left elementary school in 1909, at the age of 13. John became a messenger boy at the Manchester Post Office, but was sacked for talking back to his superior. Shortly afterwards however, he was soon accepted in a course at the Post Office School of Telegraphy. This enabled him, in 1912 to join the Commercial Cable Company as a junior operator. Moores was in a reserved occupation and did not have to be called up for military service but he volunteered for the Navy in 1917, as a wireless operator. He was posted to a shore station in Aberdeen where he remained until April 1919.

== Pre-Littlewoods days ==
After being demobilised from the Navy, Moores carried on working for the Commercial Cable company. In the early Summer of 1920 he was posted to their training school in Bixteth Street, Liverpool but after being taught to touch type, seventy to eighty words per minute and how to read cable slip, in November 1920, Moores was posted to Waterville in County Kerry, Ireland. He complained about the food that was served at the Waterville Cable Company Station, whose function was to receive messages from the US and Canada and re-transmit them to London and Liverpool. Moores was elected to run the Mess Committee. He established the Waterville Supply Company to order food from a variety of suppliers instead of just one, so was able to reduce costs and raise the quality of meals. Moores noticed that there was no public library around for miles. As a result, in April 1921 he set up a store that sold books and stationery. He bulk imported books from Britain and from Dublin and also sold golf balls as there was no sports shop or golf course. Between his telegraphist salary and the profits he made from the Waterville Supply Company (helped by his status of Mess President which meant that he did not have to pay for his own meals) he made £1,000 in 18 months.

In May 1922, Moores was posted back to Liverpool.

== Start of the football pools ==
John, Colin Askham and Bill Hughes were friends who had worked together as Post Office messenger boys in Manchester. It was whilst looking for a new money-making idea that Moores heard about John Jervis Barnard, a Birmingham man who had latched onto the public's growing passion for two things: football and betting.

Barnard had devised a 'football pool', where punters would bet on the outcome of football matches. The payouts to winners came from the 'pool' of money that was bet, less 10 per cent to cover "management costs". It had not been particularly successful. Clearly, Barnard was struggling to make a profit. Hughes obtained one of Barnard's pools coupon, and the three friends one night, in September 1922, when the cable machines were quiet, sat discussing what Barnard would have to do to make money on it. Then they decided they could do it better and they could make money out of it themselves.

They could not let their employers, the Commercial Cable Company, know what they were doing, or they would be sacked. No outside employment was allowed. That ruled out calling it, for example, John Moores Football Pool or the Colin Askham football pool. The solution to that particular problem came from Colin. He had been orphaned as a baby and been brought up by an aunt whose surname was Askham, but he had been born Colin Henry Littlewood. And so, on 1 February 1923, the Littlewood Football Pool – as it was called originally – was started.

Each of the three partners invested £50 of their own money into the venture, and with the help of a small, discreet and cheap printer they got to work. In 1923, £50 was a huge sum to invest in what – based on Barnard's experience – was a precarious venture, and as Moores himself remembered: "As I signed my own cheque at the bank, my hands were damp. It seemed such a lot of money to be risking".

A small office in Church Street, Liverpool, was rented and the first 4,000 coupons were distributed outside Manchester United's Old Trafford ground before one Saturday match that winter. Moores handed the coupons out himself, helped by some young boys eager to earn a few pennies.

It was not an instant success as just 35 coupons were returned. With bets totalling £4 7s 6d (£4.37½), the 10 per cent deducted did not cover the three men's expenses. They decided to print 10,000 coupons, and took them to Hull, where they were handed out before a big game. This time, only one coupon was returned. Their venture was about to collapse almost as soon as it had begun. In the canteen of the Commercial Cable Company, the three partners held a crisis meeting. They had kept pumping money into the fledgling business, but midway through the 1924–25 football season it was still losing money. The three young men had already invested £200, with no prospect of things improving. Bill Hughes suggested they cut their losses and forget the whole thing. Colin Askham agreed. They could see why John Jervis Barnard's idea of a football pool had failed in Birmingham. They expected Moores to concur, but instead he said: "I'll pay each of you the £200 you've invested, if you'll sell me your shares".

Moores admitted that he considered giving up on the business himself, but was encouraged by his wife, who told him "I would rather be married to a man who is haunted by failure rather than one haunted by regret". Moores kept faith and he paid Askham and Hughes £200 each.

The following year Moores enlisted the help of his younger brother Cecil to help, along with the rest of his family. In 1927 Moores gave up working for the Cable Company but in April 1929, he was prosecuted under the Ready Money Betting Act 1920. Following a court appearance, he was convicted. However, as his company never accepted cash, only postal orders that were cashed after the football results and the winning payout had been confirmed, his appeal was upheld.

In 1928, Cecil Moores devised a security system to prevent cheating. The breakthrough came when the owner of the coupon printing company Arthur Bottomes suggested that he took his exact expenses out (plus a bit extra) before calculating the winning payout. Eventually the pools took off, becoming one of the best-known names in Britain.

Moores insisted on being known as "Mr John" to those who worked at Littlewoods, rather than Mr Moores or Boss.

== Littlewoods Mail Order ==
In January 1932, Moores, who was by now a millionaire, was able to disengage himself sufficiently from the pools to start up Littlewoods Mail Order Store. At the end of the first year the turnover was £100,000. A year later, in 1934, it had risen to £400,000; and by early 1936 mail order was grossing £4 million a year. Moores had made his second million. The idea may have come from the little mail-order firm Moores had started in 1921 in Ireland, and he knew that the enormous mailing list which pools had built up would be very helpful; but it was also inspired by the hardship and poverty prevalent everywhere in the bleak depression years at the beginning of the 1930s. Also, he could remember only too well the difficulties with which his mother had to cope when feeding, clothing, and bringing up a large family or the problems when his father was too ill to work or following his death as his mother had three children then aged 13, 11 and 9 to bring up. There had for some time been institutions in existence, such as the Co-operative Society, and the tallyman of the north, which enabled the poorer members of society to buy things they needed. Moores's originality lay in applying a mix of these schemes to a large-scale business enterprise.

As usual all the family were involved. They researched and planned catalogues and helped to choose the merchandise, and Moores visited the United States to get information from big American mail-order firms such as Sears Roebuck and also Europe.

== Littlewoods stores ==
This was followed on 6 July 1937 by the opening of the first Littlewoods department store in Blackpool. By the time World War II started there were 25 Littlewoods stores across the UK and over 50 by 1952.

== The war years ==
The company then turned to war work – warehouses were equipped and staff were retrained so that the company could make parachutes. From 1940 they also made barrage balloons and in 1941 dinghies and munitions were added to the manufacturing portfolio. 1942 saw aircraft parts and bridge pieces being manufactured and from 1943 the firm built storm-boats that could cross water and land on beaches. They also became experts at 'boxing' – making compact transportable kits containing dismantled vehicles that could be reassembled at their destination overseas. The boxing division also made Pacific Packs containing rations for soldiers in the Far East. The football pools continued during the war years however.

== Post-war ==
In late January 1947, Moores fell ill and contracted meningitis – he spent two weeks in hospital. He recovered and returned to work in March but later said he felt run down for a while after that. The businesses continued to expand, and his two sons were given roles in the chain stores and at director level. The company branched out into manufacturing and testing of garments as a natural progression from the manufacturing work that had been carried out during World War II.

He decided to delegate more and put his financial affairs in order. He took out a five-year £1 million life insurance policy and put some of his shares in trust for his children (with various conditions – they were not allowed to sell the shares, his daughters received half as many as his sons in case they married as he did not want any men who were not family having influence over his business, and no child would have any shareholder power until they were 30 years old).

In 1957 the company installed its first computer to help with stock control. Nine years later in 1966 an IBM System/360 computer was installed. In June 1961 Littlewoods took over Sherman's Pools of Cardiff and Moores launched a sixth mail-order company, Peter Craig in 1967 in Preston.

== Everton Football Club ==
In March 1960, Moores gave up his chairmanship of the pools business, and handed over the reins to his brother, Cecil Moores, (10 August 1902 – 29 July 1989), so he could become a director of Everton Football Club. In June, he became the chairman. On 23 June it was revealed that during the 1959–1960 season he had lent Everton £56,000 interest free so they could buy players and on 14 April 1961 he famously sacked Johnny Carey in the back of a London taxi and appointed Harry Catterick as Everton manager in his place. The event would become synonymous in football with the phrase "taxi for...", particularly for under fire football managers.

He would remain as Everton chairman up to 29 July 1965, resigning due to the poor health of his wife, who died of cancer six weeks later. On 3 August 1972, Moores regained the chairmanship and was chairman until 1 August 1973 when he resigned for the second and final time. He then became vice-chairman. Moores retired from the Everton board of directors on 8 July 1977.

Moores attended the 1984, 1985 and 1986 FA Cup finals, all of which featured Everton. At the 1987 Football League Cup Final, sponsored by Littlewoods, Moores was the guest of honour and presented the League Cup to the winning team who were Arsenal.

== Baseball ==
John Moores was a keen baseball fan and created a league for Liverpool-based teams in 1933. He later enticed Everton players such as Dixie Dean to the game. In 1938, he donated the John Moores Trophy to the English national team for beating the United States four games to one in a five-game series, in what became known as the first Amateur World Series. The Great Britain team consisted largely of Canadians from the Yorkshire-Lancashire league.

In October 2009, Moores was posthumously inducted into the British Baseball Hall of Fame.

== Knighthood ==
On 30 April 1970, along with his friend Bessie Braddock, Moores was made a Freeman of the City of Liverpool. In the 1972 Birthday Honours, he was made a CBE for charitable services to youth and the arts in Merseyside, going to Buckingham Palace to receive it on 14 November that year for his youth work and services to the arts on Merseyside. In 1978 he was awarded the first Gold Medal for achievement, and in the 1980 Birthday Honours he was knighted for charitable services. He received his knighthood from Prince Charles on 29 October 1980.

== Family ==
Moores married Ruby Knowles (27 October 1894 – 8 September 1965) in Liverpool on 19 September 1923. They had four children:

1. Elizabeth, Lady Grantchester (8 June 1925 – 2 February 2019) who married on 12 April 1947 Kenneth Bent Suenson-Taylor, 2nd Baron Grantchester (18 August 1921 – 12 August 1995), and had issue including the present Lord Grantchester.
1. John Moores Jr., CBE (22 November 1928 – 22 May 2012),
2. Peter Moores, CBE (9 April 1932 – 23 March 2016) and
3. Janitha Moores later Stubbs (b. 4 July 1937).

== Other interests ==
In 1992, Liverpool Polytechnic took the name Liverpool John Moores University in his honour upon being granted university status. A statue was later built which stands in the courtyard of the university's Avril Robarts Library.

In 1956 he became chairman of the Liverpool Motorists' Outing for Handicapped Children.

The John Moores Painting Prize is co-ordinated by National Museums Liverpool. The first John Moores exhibition was held in 1957, six years after the Walker Art Gallery re-opened after World War II. It was intended as a one-off, but its success led to it becoming a biennial event. By the early 1960s, the exhibition was regarded as the UK's leading showcase for avant-garde painting. Winning works have included classic paintings by Jack Smith (Creation and Crucifixion), William Scott, Roger Hilton (March 1963) and David Hockney (Peter Getting Out of Nick's Pool).

== Political activities ==
Between 1933 and August 1940 Moores was a Conservative councillor for the Sefton parish for Sefton Rural District and West Lancashire Rural District. In September 1933 he stood as a National Government candidate for Clay Cross and at the November 1935 General Election in Nuneaton but failed to be elected both times. Moores was critical of socialism, but in November 1935 he called for coal miners to be paid more money and for them to have better working conditions. Despite his Conservative views, he was a friend of the Labour MP Bessie Braddock and the two worked together on several projects involving Liverpool.

== Later years ==
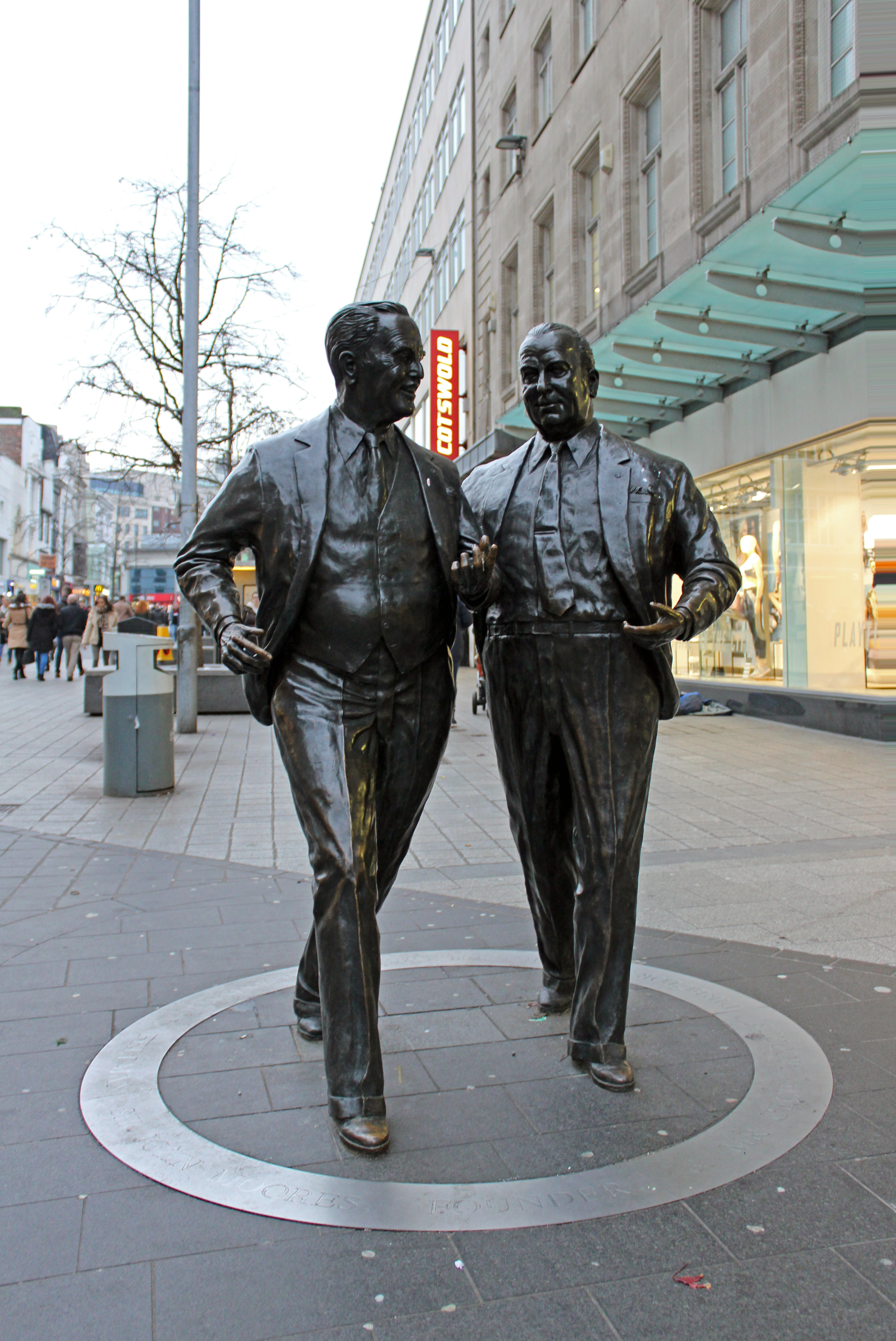
Statues of John and Cecil Moores by Tom Murphy, Church Street, Liverpool

Moores retired as chairman on 24 October 1977 of Littlewoods and was succeeded by his son Peter. He went into semi-retirement, visiting his office on the 11th floor of the Littlewoods organisation between 10 am and 1 pm every Monday, Wednesday and Friday. However, as profits fell from 49 million to 11 million, (Moores remained on the board) he resumed the chairmanship on 10 October 1980. He resigned for the second and final time on 25 March 1982 and went into semi-retirement again. On 28 May 1982 he was made life president of the organisation. He attended board meetings until 1986.

On 23 March 1986, Moores was burgled and tied up in his home. Two shotguns, jewellery, and money were stolen. The case was featured on Crimewatch UK two months later.

John Clement succeeded Moores as chairman, the first non-family member to do so. Moores had two operations, on his achilles tendon in May 1986, and then for an enlarged prostate in July 1986, but never fully recovered nor regained his health. In 1987 he used a walking stick as a mobility aid but the following year he began using a wheelchair.

In May 1988, he attended his final ever AGM, but whilst there he began to struggle to speak and suddenly lost his thread. That was his final ever involvement with Littlewoods. He was unable to talk at all in the final years of his life.

== Death ==
Sir John Moores died at his home, "Fairways", at Shireburn Road, Freshfield, Formby, on Saturday, 25 September 1993, where he had lived since 1930. He was cremated six days later in Southport in a funeral attended by family members only. A memorial service was held for him on 30 November 1993 in Liverpool's Anglican Cathedral attended by 2,000 people, 1,500 of them Littlewoods employees. His son John Jnr paid tribute to his late father in an address.

== Will ==
The following month it was revealed he left an estate valued at £10 million gross in his will that he made on 11 March 1988. and that he left most of his fortune to his four children. Littlewoods revealed he relinquished nearly all his shares in Littlewoods in 1979. His shares in Everton FC were left to his two sons and his shareholdings and investments in Bermuda to his two daughters.

The Sunday Times Rich List 1989 estimated his estate to be worth £1.7 billion. The Littlewoods businesses were sold to the Barclay Brothers, nine years after Moores' death, in October 2002.

In the 2006 Sunday Times Rich List, the Moores family's wealth was estimated at £1,160M.

== Sources ==
- Barbara Clegg (his niece), ‘Moores, Sir John (1896–1993)’, Oxford Dictionary of National Biography, Oxford University Press, 2004 accessed 3 June 2006
