= Netherley (Liverpool ward) =

Former ward of Liverpool City Council (UK)

- Netherley ward (1980) within Liverpool
- Registered Electors: 5,649 (2003 election)
- Metropolitan borough: City of Liverpool
- Metropolitan county: Merseyside
- Region: North West
- Country: England
- Sovereign state: United Kingdom
- UK Parliament: Liverpool Garston

Netherley ward was an electoral division of Liverpool City Council between 1980 and 2004. It and was centred on the Netherley district of Liverpool.

== Background ==
The ward was first formed in 1980 and was dissolved in 2004.

A report of the Local Government Boundary Commission for England published in November 1978 set out proposals for changes to the wards of Liverpool City Council, maintaining the number of councillors at 99 representing 33 wards. Netherley ward was created from the former Woolton East ward to be represented by three councillors.

The report describes the boundaries of Netherley ward as "Commencing at a point where the eastern boundary of the City meets the West Derby-Hunt's Cross railway, thence northwestwards along said railway to the southeastern boundary of Valley Ward, thence generally northeastwards along said boundary to the eastern boundary of the City, thence northeastwards generally southeastwards and westwards along said boundary to the point of commencement".

The ward was part of the Liverpool Garston Parliamentary constituency.

=== 2004 election ===
A review by the Boundary Committee for England recommended that the council was formed of a reduced number of 90 members elected from 30 wards. Netherley ward was dissolved and distributed into the new Belle Vale ward.

== See also ==
- Liverpool City Council
- Liverpool City Council elections 1880–present
- Liverpool Town Council elections 1835 - 1879
