= Valley (Liverpool ward) =

Former ward of Liverpool City Council (UK)

- Valley ward (1980) within Liverpool
- Registered Electors: 7,070 (2003 election)
- Metropolitan borough: City of Liverpool
- Metropolitan county: Merseyside
- Region: North West
- Country: England
- Sovereign state: United Kingdom
- UK Parliament: Liverpool Garston

Valley ward was an electoral division of Liverpool City Council between 1980 and 2004. It was centred on the Belle Vale district of Liverpool, United Kingdom.

== Background ==
The ward was first formed in 1980 and was dissolved in 2004.

A report of the Local Government Boundary Commission for England published in November 1978 set out proposals for changes to the wards of Liverpool City Council, maintaining the number of councillors at 99 representing 33 wards. Valley ward was created from the former Childwall ward to be represented by three councillors.

The report describes the boundaries of Valley ward as "Commencing at a point where Belle Vale Road meets the West Derby-Hunt's Cross railway, thence northwestwards along said railway and continuing northwestwards and eastwards along the eastern boundary of Childwall Ward to the eastern boundary of the City, thence southeastwards and northeastwards along said boundary to a point being National Grid reference SJ4370589238, thence in prolongation southeastwards of said boundary to Naylor's Road, thence southwards along said road to Childwall Valley Road, thence northwestwards along said road to Belle Vale Road, thence southwestwards along said road to the point of commencement".

The ward was part of the Liverpool Garston Parliamentary constituency.

=== 2004 election ===
A review by the Boundary Committee for England recommended that the council was formed of a reduced number of 90 members elected from 30 wards. Valley ward was dissolved and distributed into the new Belle Vale ward with a small part into the reformed Childwall ward.

== See also ==
- Liverpool City Council
- Liverpool City Council elections 1880–present
- Liverpool Town Council elections 1835 - 1879
