= Netherley, Liverpool =

Coordinates: 53.3895°N 2.8403°W

Netherley
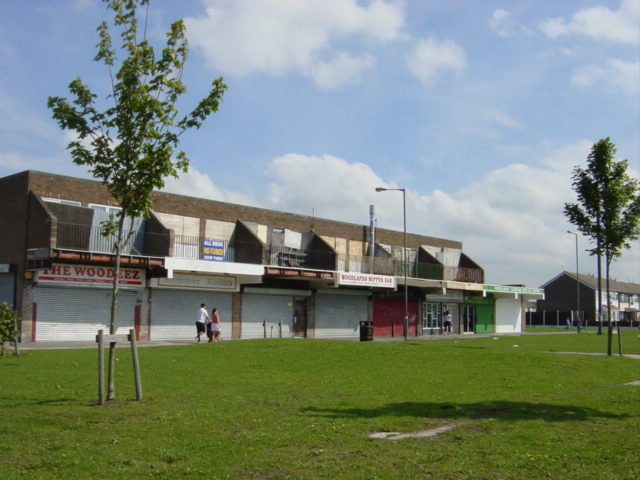
- Shops on Wood Lane, Netherley

- Location within Merseyside
- Population: 8,068 (2001 Census)
- OS grid reference: SJ337927
- Metropolitan borough: Liverpool
- Metropolitan county: Merseyside
- Region: North West
- Country: England
- Sovereign state: United Kingdom
- Post town: Liverpool
- Postcode district: L27
- Dialling code: 0151
- Police: Merseyside
- Fire: Merseyside
- Ambulance: North West
- UK Parliament: Liverpool Garston

Netherley is an area in the city of Liverpool, Merseyside, England. It is bordered by Belle Vale and situated near to Huyton, Tarbock and Halewood.

Netherley is a leafy suburb of Liverpool, Merseyside, England. It is in the south of the city surrounded mostly by farmland and countryside, Liverpool City Council ward of Belle Vale. At the 2001 Census, Netherley had a population of 8,068 (3,703 males, 4,365 females).

== Description ==
Netherley is predominantly a residential area located on the eastern side of Liverpool and is taken up by 44% green belt which restricts potential industrial growth.

However Netherley's Caldway Drive is the new location for the Belle Vale Junior Football League which had to relocate from playing fields in nearby Belle Vale to accommodate the building of a new school.

== History ==
Netherley was built on farmland on the edge of Gateacre in 1968 for tenants moved out of unfit housing in Liverpool city centre.

Lee Manor High School, built in 1970, was originally called Netherley Community Comprehensive School. The school changed its name to Lee Manor High School in the early 1990s and closed in 2000.

Many of Netherley's flats and maisonettes were demolished between 1983 and 1985 to make way for new houses. Lee Valley Housing took over management of council properties in 2003, making improvements to 1,700 homes.

== Crime ==
The area has a relatively low crime rate and high employment in 2020.

Crime Figures 2019/20	Liverpool City Council	English average
Violence against the person	1.5 16.7	
Robbery offences	0.7	1.2
Theft of a motor vehicle offences	0.2	2.9
Sexual offences	0.0	0.9
Burglary dwelling offences	0.7	4.3
Theft from a vehicle offences	0.1	7.6

== Economy ==
The area lost a major local employer, HPL Jars & Containers, in 2006. After thirty plus years, it was bought out by M&H Plastics and production was transferred out of the area.

== Education ==
St. Gregory's Catholic Primary School received an excellent Ofsted report in 2005. Built at the same time as the local housing, the school has adapted over the years to meet the demands of the area, such as admitting a large number of pupils from Cross Farm School which was closed by the local educational authority due to a surplus of places in the area. The nearby Norman Pannell Primary School is also a popular school in Netherley.

== Transport ==
The 79 bus service links Netherley to Liverpool City Centre. Operated by Arriva the 79 it has been operated by Arriva's predecessors for many years, however since 2011 some journeys continue to Halewood. The variant 79C (Liverpool City Centre - Runcorn) touches the edge of Netherley at Caldway Drive and services 3/3A/89/217/217A touch the edge of the estate at Naylor's Road from Belle Vale, Woolton and Speke to Huyton, Knowsley, Kirkby.

The nearest current National Rail station is Huyton, approximately just over of 2 miles away from Netherley, where fairly regular trains go to/from Liverpool Lime Street, and generally continue on to Wigan North Western, Preston, Manchester Victoria, Manchester Airport and Warrington Bank Quay stations. Hunts Cross and Liverpool South Parkway stations are within the catchment area of Netherley and are accessible via bus and road routes.

Netherley is approximately 3 miles away from the western terminus of the M62 motorway, Rocket Roundabout in Broadgreen and a similar distance from Junction 5 of the M62/M57/A5300, Tarbock Roundabout interchange in Knowsley.

== Other services ==
- Netherley Health Centre
- Post Office
- Valley Community Theatre

.

== Gallery ==
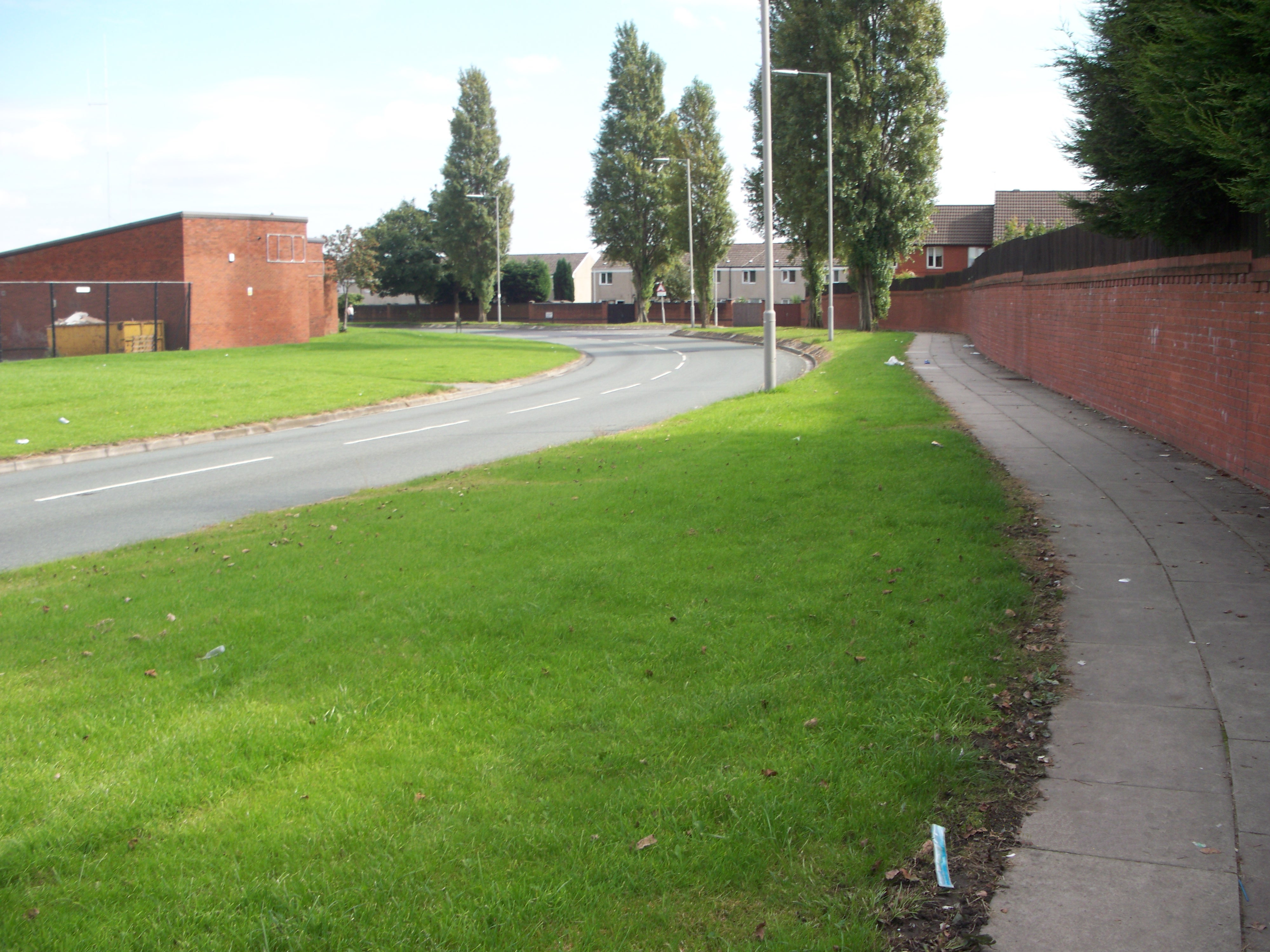
Caldway Drive, Liverpool

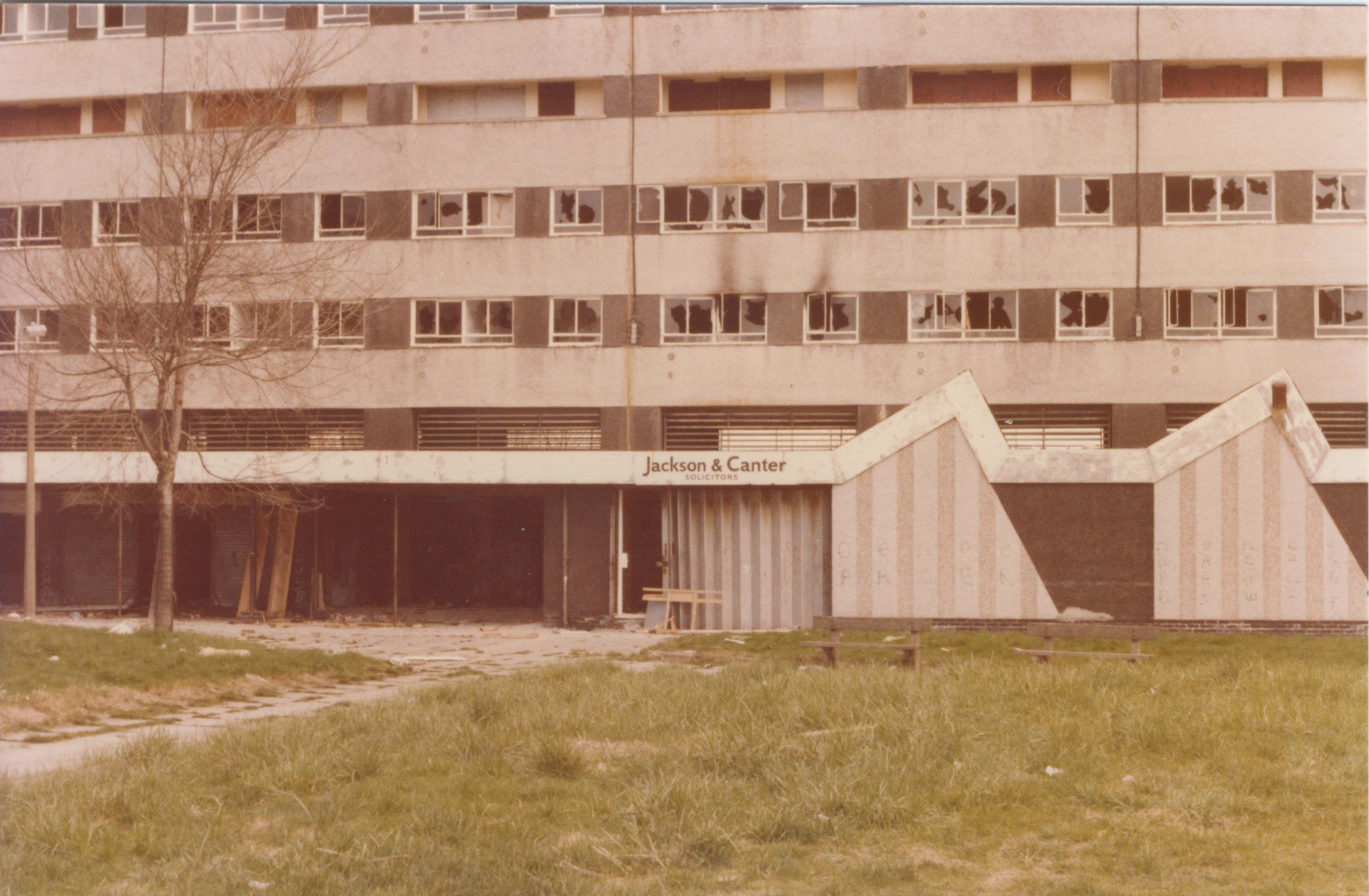
Jackson and Canter Solicitors Offices in Netherley, Liverpool vacated and vandalised, awaiting demolition (December 1983)

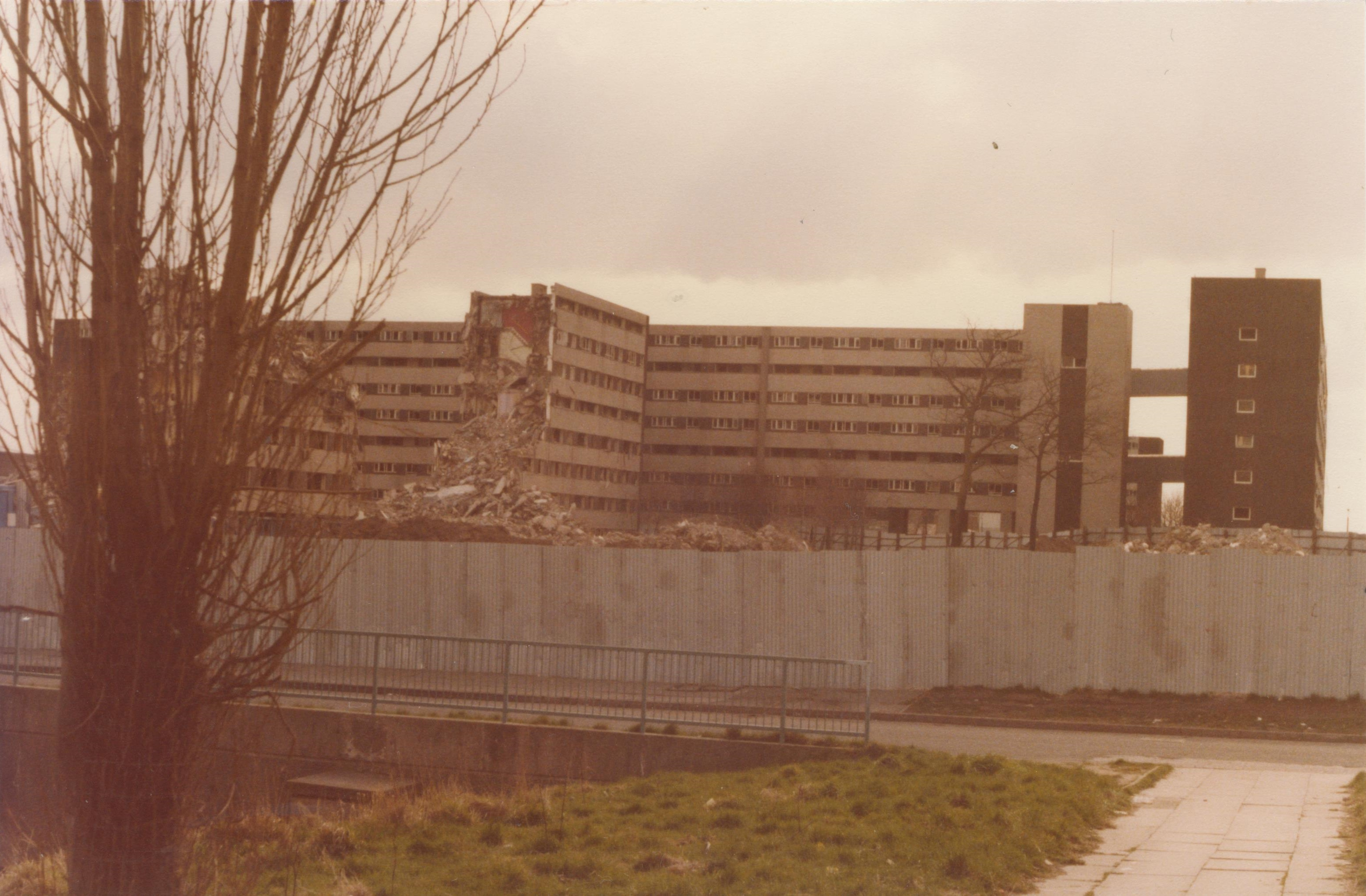
Paveley Bank, Netherley, Liverpool - housing being demolished (December 1983)

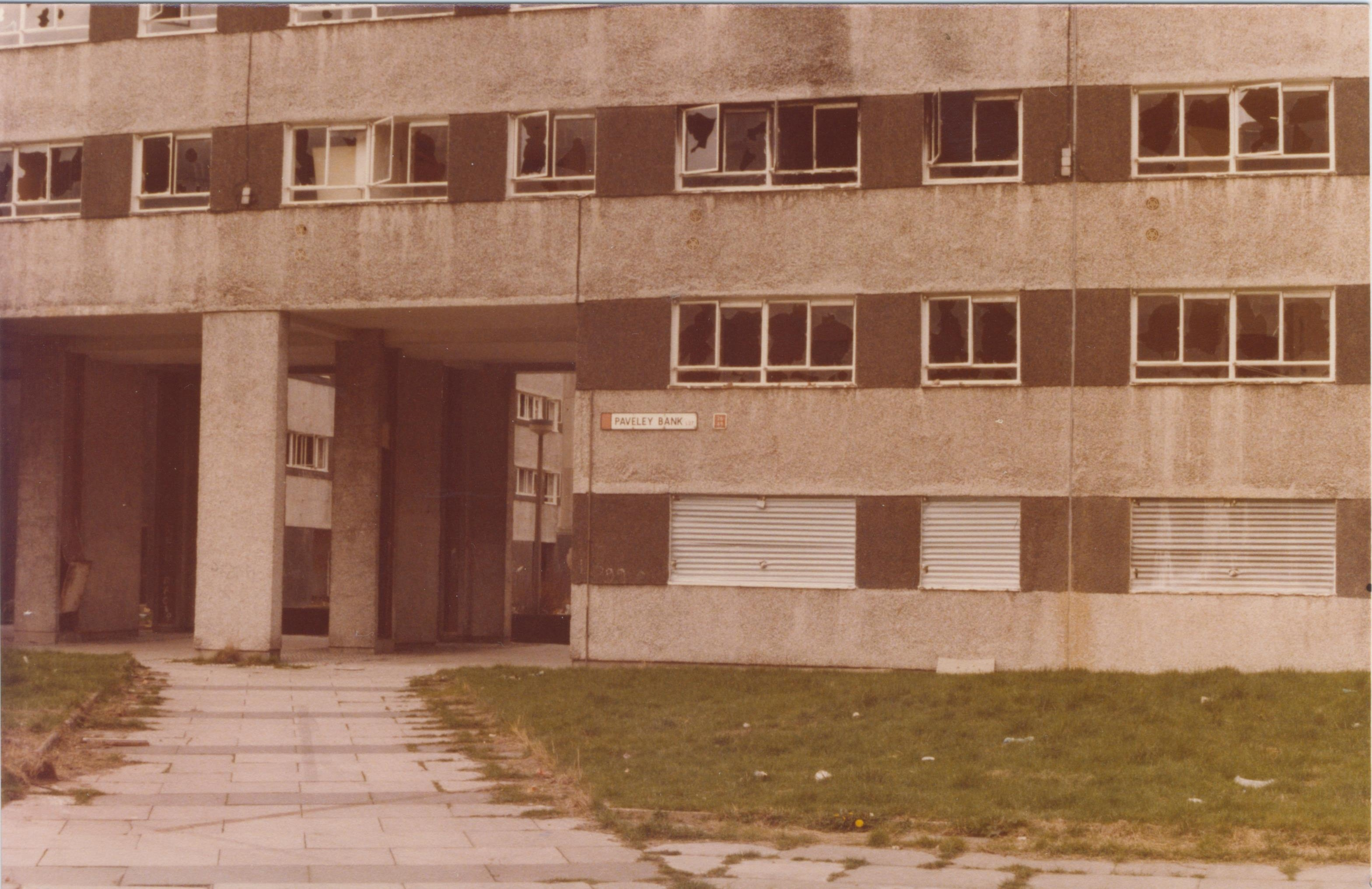
Paveley Bank, Netherley, Liverpool vacated and vandalised, awaiting demolition (December 1983)

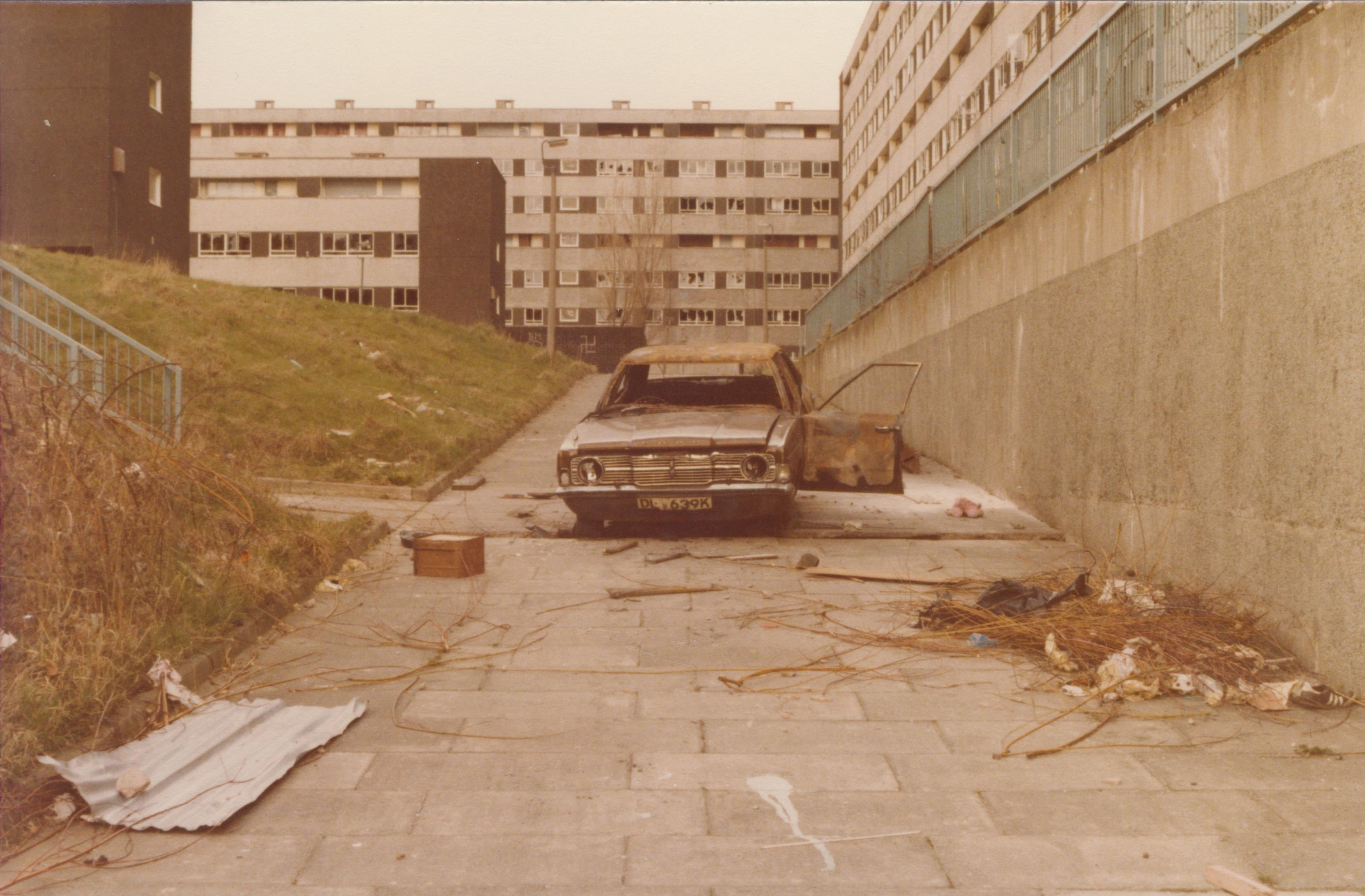
Subway in Netherley, Liverpool vandalised, burned-out car, awaiting demolition (December 1983)
