= Garston and Halewood =

UK Parliament constituency (2010–2024)

Coordinates: 53.358°N 2.870°W

- Former borough constituency for the House of Commons
- Boundary of Garston and Halewood in Merseyside

- Location of Merseyside within England
- County: Merseyside
- Electorate: 71,618 (December 2010)
- Major settlements: Allerton, Cressington, Garston, Halewood, Hunt's Cross

2010–2024
- Seats: One
- Created from: Liverpool Garston, Knowsley South
- Replaced by: Liverpool Garston, Widnes and Halewood

Garston and Halewood was a constituency (Note: A borough constituency (for the purposes of election expenses and type of returning officer)) created in 2010 and was represented in the House of Commons of the UK Parliament since 2010 by Maria Eagle of the Labour Party. (Note: As with all constituencies, the constituency elects one Member of Parliament (MP) by the first past the post system of election at least every five years.)

Following the 2023 Periodic Review of Westminster constituencies, the seat was abolished at the 2024 general election, with the majority (parts in the City of Liverpool) being included in the re-established constituency of Liverpool Garston. Halewood is included in the new constituency of Widnes and Halewood.

== History ==
Creation

The seat was created for the 2010 general election during the Boundary Commission for England's review of constituencies.

Political history

The 2015 re-election of frontbencher Maria Eagle (Lab) made the seat the 11th safest of Labour's 232 seats by percentage of majority.

== Boundaries ==
Map of boundaries 2010-2024

The City of Liverpool wards of Allerton and Hunts Cross, Belle Vale, Cressington, Speke-Garston, and Woolton, and the Metropolitan Borough of Knowsley wards of Halewood North, Halewood South, and Halewood West. The boundaries have been drawn to date almost square, favouring neither riverside nor inland reach.

The constituency covers most of the previous Liverpool Garston (part of the city of Liverpool), together with the most southerly part of the borough of Knowsley (previously in the Knowsley South constituency).

== Constituency profile ==
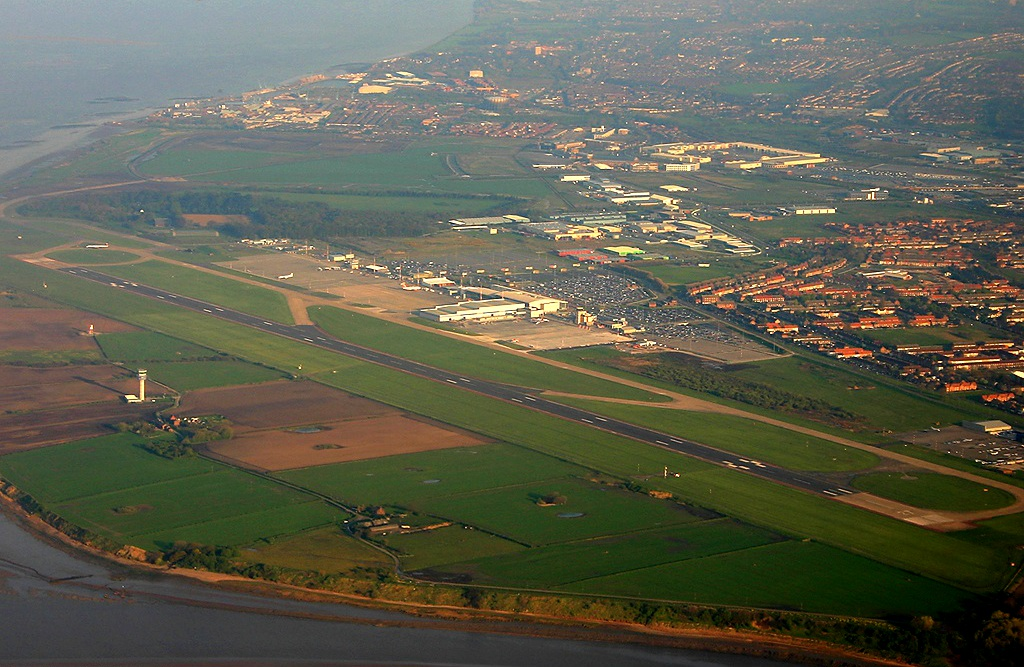
Aerial view of Liverpool John Lennon Airport in 2005 and surrounding semi-urban land forming a southern minority of the seat

Two parts of the political division are green — land surrounding its airport (including the National Trust for Places of Historic Interest or Natural Beauty's archetypal Tudor Speke Hall and grounds) and in the north east, parts of Hough Green and Tarbock Green. The remainder is urban and forms the southern tip of the Merseyside metropolitan county (of mid-size among the 1974-enacted units). The constituency as drawn stretches along the most up-river part of the Mersey Estuary before its brief start between Cheshire and the remainder of its former county of Lancashire, on a near-flat riverside. The history of the City of Liverpool (right) bank of the Mersey witnessed in the late 20th century the ceasing of shipbuilding and a sharp decline in trade, rail distribution and manufacturing prompting mass unemployment. Its now-modest socially rented housing stock alleviated overcrowding of Liverpool. The seat is centred approximately 5 miles (8.0 km) from the city centre. The constituency also includes Liverpool Airport

Deprivation is low for the metropolitan county and marginally higher than the region as a whole. As at the 2011 census 60% of housing was owner-occupied (compared to 64.5% in the North West of England region). At the same census 9.1% of households were deprived in three or the maximum of four dimensions measured by the ONS — in the region the figure is 7.0%.

== Members of Parliament ==
Election	Member	Party
2010	Maria Eagle	Labour

== Elections ==
=== Elections in the 2010s ===
General election 2019: Garston and Halewood
Party	Candidate	Votes	%	±%
Labour	Maria Eagle	38,578	72.3	―5.4
Conservative	Neva Novaky	6,954	13.0	―4.7
Liberal Democrats	Kris Brown	3,324	6.2	+3.0
Brexit Party	Jake Fraser	2,943	5.5	New
Green	Jean-Paul Roberts	1,183	2.2	+0.8
Liberal	Hazel Williams	344	0.6	New
Majority		31,624	59.3	―0.7
Turnout		53,326	70.1	―1.4
Labour hold		Swing	―0.3	

General election 2017: Garston and Halewood
Party	Candidate	Votes	%	±%
Labour	Maria Eagle	41,599	77.7	+8.6
Conservative	Adam Marsden	9,450	17.7	+4.0
Liberal Democrats	Anna Martin	1,723	3.2	―1.5
Green	Lawrence Brown	750	1.4	―2.1
Majority		32,149	60.0	+4.6
Turnout		53,665	71.5	+5.4
Labour hold		Swing	+2.2	

General election 2015: Garston and Halewood
Party	Candidate	Votes	%	±%
Labour	Maria Eagle	33,839	69.1	+9.6
Conservative	Martin Williams	6,693	13.7	―2.4
UKIP	Carl Schears	4,482	9.2	+5.6
Liberal Democrats	Anna Martin	2,279	4.7	―15.4
Green	Will Ward	1,690	3.5	New
Majority		27,146	55.4	+16.0
Turnout		48,983	66.1	+6.0
Labour hold		Swing	+6.0	

General election 2010: Garston and Halewood
Party	Candidate	Votes	%	±%
Labour	Maria Eagle*	25,493	59.5	+1.6
Liberal Democrats	Paula Keaveney	8,616	20.1	―9.9
Conservative	Richard Downey	6,908	16.1	+6.3
UKIP	Tony Hammond	1,540	3.6	+1.8
Respect	Diana Raby	268	0.6	New
Majority		16,877	39.4	+11.5
Turnout		42,825	60.1	+6.8
Labour hold		Swing	―5.7	

* Served as an MP in the 2005–2010 Parliament

== See also ==
- List of parliamentary constituencies in Merseyside
