= Maria Eagle =

British Labour politician (born 1961)

The Right Honourable Maria Eagle MP
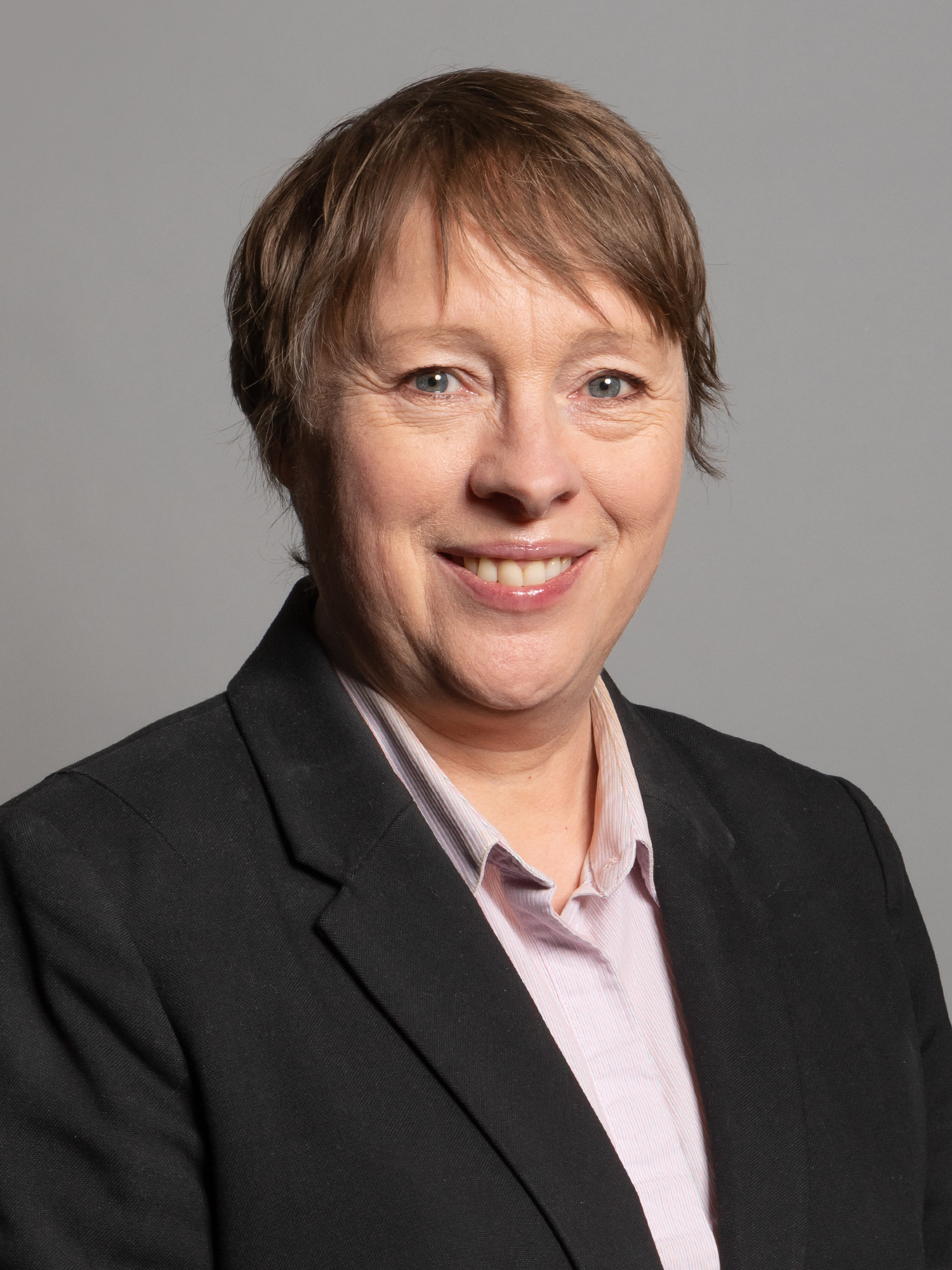
- Official portrait, 2020

Minister of State for Defence Procurement and Industry
- In office 8 July 2024 – 6 September 2025
- Prime Minister: Keir Starmer
- Preceded by: James Cartlidge
- Succeeded by: Luke Pollard

Minister of State for Justice and Equalities (Note: Parliamentary Under-Secretary of State from 2007 to 2009)
- In office 2 July 2007 – 6 May 2010
- Prime Minister: Gordon Brown
- Preceded by: Gerry Sutcliffe
- Succeeded by: Crispin Blunt
Junior ministerial offices
Parliamentary Under-Secretary of State for Children in Northern Ireland
In office 6 May 2006 – 28 June 2007
Prime Minister	Tony Blair
Preceded by	Jeff Rooker
Succeeded by	Office abolished
Parliamentary Under-Secretary of State for Children
In office 17 June 2005 – 6 May 2006
Prime Minister	Tony Blair
Preceded by	Margaret Hodge
Succeeded by	Beverley Hughes
Parliamentary Under-Secretary of State for Disabled People
In office 11 June 2001 – 17 June 2005
Prime Minister	Tony Blair
Preceded by	Margaret Hodge
Succeeded by	Anne McGuire

Member of Parliament for Liverpool Garston Garston and Halewood (2010–2024)
- Incumbent
- Assumed office 1 May 1997
- Preceded by: Eddie Loyden
- Majority: 20,104 (47.9%)
Shadow portfolios
Shadow Secretary of State
2016	Culture, Media and Sport
2015–2016	Defence
2013–2015	Environment, Food and Rural Affairs
2010–2013	Transport
Shadow Minister
2023–2024	Defence Procurement
2010	Solicitor General

Personal details
- Born: 17 February 1961 (age 65) Bridlington, East Riding of Yorkshire, England
- Party: Labour
- Relatives: Angela Eagle (sister)
- Education: Pembroke College, Oxford; University of Law

Maria Eagle (born 17 February 1961) is a British Labour Party politician who has been the Member of Parliament (MP) for Liverpool Garston, previously Garston and Halewood, since 1997. She served as a junior minister in the governments of Tony Blair, Gordon Brown and Keir Starmer.

The twin sister of Angela Eagle, also a Labour MP, Eagle was born in the East Riding of Yorkshire to a working-class family and raised in Merseyside. She studied Philosophy, politics and economics at Pembroke College, Oxford and Law at the College of Law, London. After graduating with her law degree, she worked as an articled clerk and solicitor in both London and Liverpool. After unsuccessfully contesting Crosby in 1992, she was elected as MP for Liverpool Garston at the 1997 general election.

Under Tony Blair, Eagle was a junior minister at the Department for Work and Pensions, Department for Education and Skills and Northern Ireland Office. She was Minister of State at the Ministry of Justice and Government Equalities Office under Gordon Brown. Following the 2010 general election, Eagle became Shadow Solicitor General for England and Wales. She served in the Shadow cabinet as Shadow Transport Secretary, Shadow Environment, Food and Rural Affairs Secretary, Shadow Defence Secretary and finally Shadow Culture, Media and Sport Secretary. She resigned from the Corbyn shadow cabinet in June 2016. She returned to the frontbench under Starmer in 2023, and following Labour's victory at the 2024 general election she returned to government as Minister of State for Defence Procurement and Industry. She returned to the backbenches in the 2025 cabinet reshuffle.

== Early life and career ==
Maria Eagle was born on 17 February 1961 in Bridlington, the daughter of Shirley (née Kirk), a factory worker, and André Eagle, a print worker. She was educated at St Peter's Church of England School in Formby, Merseyside and Formby High School before attending Pembroke College, Oxford, where she graduated with a Bachelor of Arts degree in Philosophy, politics and economics in 1983.

Eagle worked in the voluntary sector from 1983 to 1990, and then went to the College of Law, London, where she took her law finals in 1990, before she joined Brian Thompson & Partners in Liverpool as an articled clerk in 1990. In 1992 she became a solicitor with Goldsmith Williams in Liverpool, and later a Solicitor at Stephen Irving & Co also in Liverpool, where she remained until her election to Westminster.

After joining the Labour Party, Eagle was elected the secretary of the Crosby Constituency Labour Party (CLP) for two years in 1983, and was also elected as the campaigns organiser with that CLP for three years in 1993.

== Parliamentary career ==
At the 1992 general election, Eagle stood as the Labour Party candidate in Crosby, coming second with 25.7% of the vote behind the incumbent Conservative MP Malcolm Thornton.

=== Backbencher ===
Prior to the 1997 general election, Eagle was selected through an all-women shortlist to stand as the Labour candidate in Liverpool Garston. Eagle was elected to Parliament as MP for Liverpool Garston with 61.3% of the vote and a majority of 18,417. She made her maiden speech on 17 June 1997.

She became a member of the Public Accounts Committee and in 1999 she was appointed the Parliamentary Private Secretary to the Minister of State at the Department of Health, John Hutton. Her proposed ban on mink fur farming was defeated as a Private member's bill but subsequently picked up by the government and enacted as the Fur Farming (Prohibition) Act 2000.

Eagle was re-elected as MP for Liverpool Garston at the 2001 general election with an increased vote share of 61.4% and a decreased majority of 12,494.

=== Government minister ===
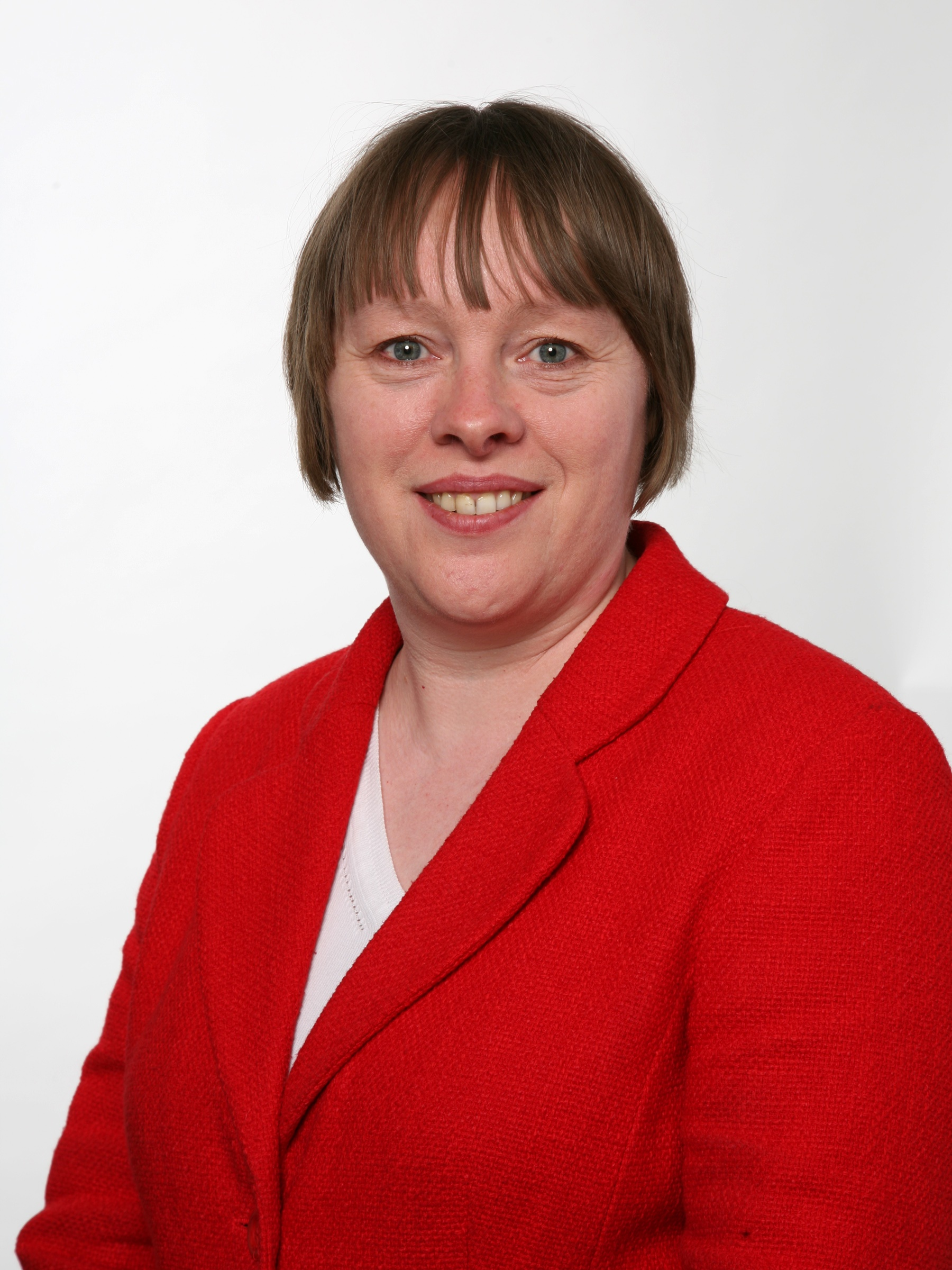
Official portrait, 2007

Eagle was promoted to the Tony Blair government following the 2001 general election as a Parliamentary Under-Secretary of State at the Department for Work and Pensions.

At the 2005 general election, Eagle was again re-elected, with a decreased vote share of 54% and a decreased majority of 7,193. Following the election, she was the Minister for Children at the Department for Education and Skills, until the May 2006 reshuffle moved her to Northern Ireland, where she was minister for Employment and Learning.

Eagle was moved to the Ministry of Justice when Gordon Brown became Prime Minister in June 2007. In September 2008, she was nominated for Stonewall Politician of the Year for her work to support equality for lesbian, gay and bisexual people. As part of the government reshuffle in October 2008, she assumed additional responsibility for Equalities. In the June 2009 reshuffle, she was promoted to Minister of State.

=== Expenses controversy ===
On 17 May 2009, during the United Kingdom parliamentary expenses scandal, The Daily Telegraph revealed that Eagle had claimed £3,500 for the refurbishment of the bathroom of her Liverpool home, then switched her second home designation to a different property four months later. Eagle voted in favour of legislation which would have kept MPs' expenses information secret.

=== In opposition ===
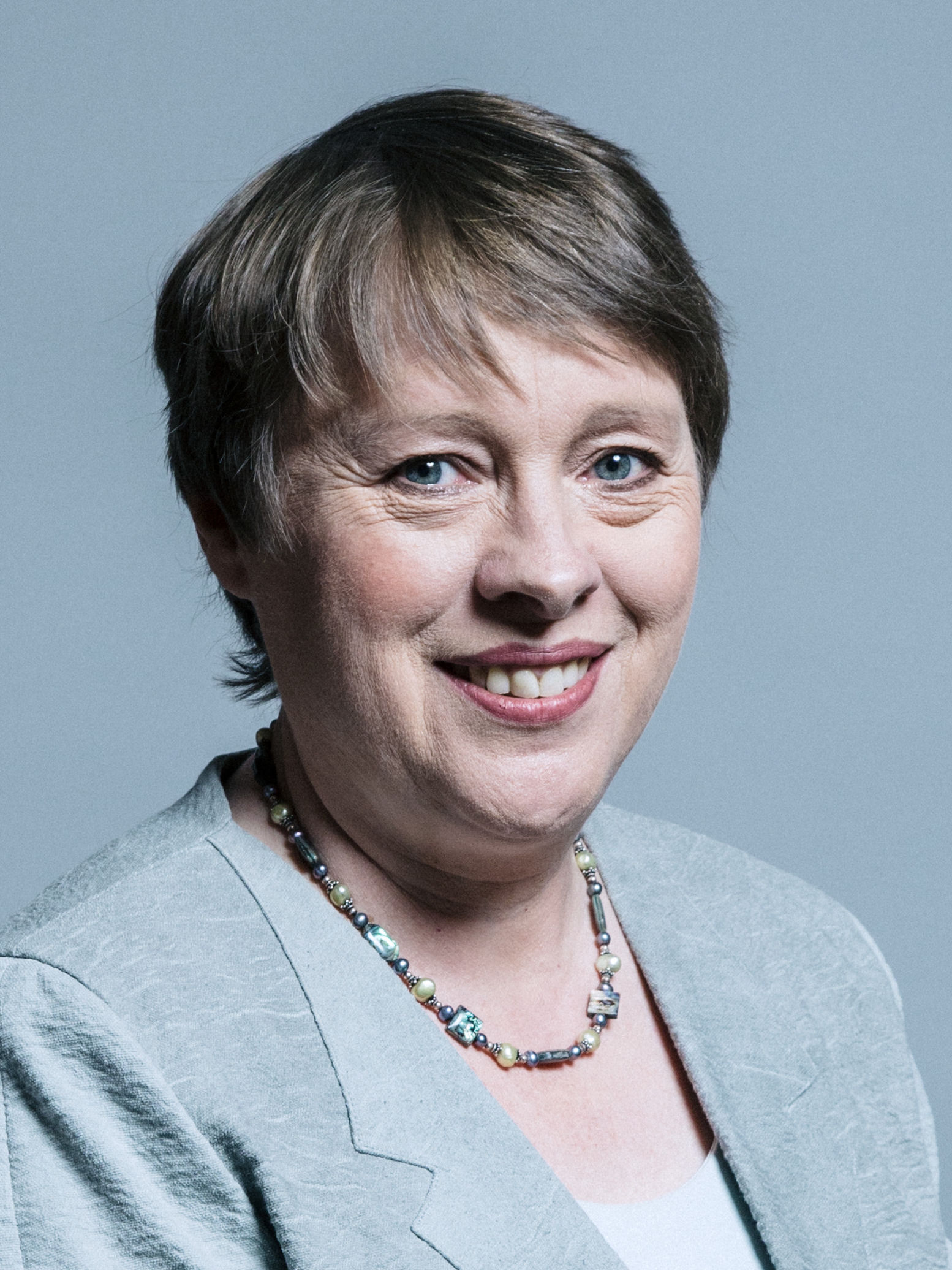
Official portrait, 2017

Prior to the 2010 general election, Eagle's constituency of Liverpool Garston was abolished, and replaced with Garston and Halewood. At the 2010 general election, Eagle was elected to Parliament as MP for Garston and Halewood with 59.5% of the vote and a majority of 16,877.

Following the election, she served in interim Labour leader Harriet Harman's frontbench as Shadow Solicitor General for England and Wales and Shadow Minister for Justice. In October 2010 Eagle was elected to the Shadow cabinet of new Labour Party leader Ed Miliband as Shadow Secretary of State for Transport in the Labour Party Shadow Cabinet election.

In February 2013, she voted in favour in the House of Commons Second Reading vote on marriage equality in Britain.

At the 2015 general election, Eagle was re-elected as MP for Garston and Halewood with an increased vote share of 69.1% and an increased majority of 27,146.

Eagle was appointed Shadow Secretary of State for Defence in September 2015 by newly elected Labour leader Jeremy Corbyn. She said she was surprised by her appointment as she had disagreed with Corbyn's advocacy of unilateral nuclear disarmament and supported the renewal of the Trident nuclear weapons system. Tasked with leading Labour's defence review, she said she would not rule out the possibility of it recommending unilateral disarmament. However, she described Corbyn commenting he would not countenance using a nuclear deterrent as "unhelpful" to the policy process.

In January 2016, Eagle was moved to the position of Shadow Secretary of State for Culture, Media and Sport. She resigned from the shadow cabinet on 27 June 2016 in the mass resignation of the Shadow Cabinet following the Brexit referendum.

She supported Owen Smith in the failed attempt to replace Jeremy Corbyn in the 2016 Labour leadership election.

At the snap 2017 general election, Eagle was again re-elected with an increased vote share of 77.7% and an increased majority of 32,149. She was again re-elected at the 2019 general election, with a decreased vote share of 72.3% and a decreased majority of 31,624.

She is a supporter of Labour Friends of Israel.

On 15 February 2023, she was appointed as a member of the Privy Council.

In the 2023 British shadow cabinet reshuffle, she was appointed Shadow Minister for Procurement.

=== Return to government ===
Due to the 2023 review of Westminster constituencies, Eagle's constituency of Garston and Halewood was abolished, and replaced with Liverpool Garston. At the 2024 general election, Eagle was elected to Parliament as MP for Liverpool Garston with 58.4% of the vote and a majority of 20,104. She was appointed as Minister of State for Defence Procurement and Industry on 8 July.

In November 2024, Eagle voted in favour of the Terminally Ill Adults (End of Life) Bill, which proposes to legalise assisted dying.

Eagle left the government in the 2025 British cabinet reshuffle.

== Personal life ==
Following her initial election, Eagle joined her twin sister Angela in Parliament. (Note: They are sometimes incorrectly described as the first set of twins to sit in the Commons at the same time; in fact the first set of twins is believed to have been James and Richard Grenville, who sat together for Buckingham between 1774 and 1780.) Maria describes herself as "the straight one", while Angela is a lesbian.

== Publications ==
- High Time or High Tide for Labour Women? by Maria Eagle and Joni Lovenduski, 1998, Fabian Society Books, ISBN 0-7163-0585-2, OCLC 39267019

Parliament of the United Kingdom
Preceded by Eddie Loyden	Member of Parliament for Liverpool Garston; 1997–2010	Constituency abolished
New constituency	Member of Parliament for Garston and Halewood; 2010–2024	Constituency abolished
New constituency	Member of Parliament for Liverpool Garston; 2024–present	Incumbent
Political offices
Preceded by Margaret Hodge	Minister for Disabled People; 2001–2005	Succeeded by Anne McGuire
Preceded by Margaret Hodge	Minister for Children and Families; 2005–2006	Succeeded by Beverley Hughes
Preceded by Jeff Rooker	Minister for Children in Northern Ireland; 2006–2007	Office abolished
Preceded by Gerry Sutcliffe	Minister of State for Justice and Equalities; 2007–2010	Succeeded by Crispin Blunt
Preceded by Jonathan Djanogly	Shadow Solicitor General for England and Wales; 2010	Succeeded by Catherine McKinnell
Preceded by Sadiq Khan	Shadow Secretary of State for Transport; 2010–2013	Succeeded by Mary Creagh
Preceded by Mary Creagh	Shadow Secretary of State for Environment, Food and Rural Affairs; 2013–2015	Succeeded by Kerry McCarthy
Preceded by Vernon Coaker	Shadow Secretary of State for Defence; 2015–2016	Succeeded by Emily Thornberry
Preceded by Michael Dugher	Shadow Secretary of State for Culture, Media and Sport; 2016	Succeeded by Kelvin Hopkins
