= Tim Fortescue =

British politician (1916–2008)

Member of Parliament for Liverpool Garston
- In office 31 March 1966 – 8 February 1974
- Preceded by: Richard Bingham
- Succeeded by: Eddie Loyden

Personal details
- Born: Trevor Victor Norman Fortescue; 28 August 1916 Chingford, Essex, England
- Died: 29 September 2008 (aged 92)
- Education: King's College, Cambridge

Trevor Victor Norman "Tim" Fortescue, CBE (28 August 1916 – 29 September 2008), was a British politician. He was the Conservative Member of Parliament (MP) for Liverpool Garston from 1966 to 1974.

== Early life ==
Fortescue was born on 28 August 1916 in Chingford, Essex, England. He was educated at Uppingham School, a private school in Uppingham, Rutland. He then went to King's College, Cambridge to study modern languages.

In 1938 he graduated and joined the Colonial Service. He was posted to Hong Kong and was there when it was captured by the Japanese during the Battle of Hong Kong in December 1941. He remained in Japanese captivity until the surrender of Japan in 1945.

After World War 2, he worked for the Colonial Service, the United Nations Food and Agriculture Organization, the Milk Marketing Board and Nestlé before embarking on a career in politics.

== Political career ==
Fortescue was first elected to Parliament in the 1966 general election. He was re-elected to the 1970 general election and, having been appointed by Edward Heath as an assistant whip under Francis Pym, served as a senior whip, Lord Commissioner of the Treasury from 1971 until he resigned in September 1973. He retired from the Commons at the February 1974 general election at which the Labour candidate was elected.

After leaving politics, he became general secretary of the Food and Drink Industries Council, now called the Food and Drink Federation.

== Revelations about paedophilia in the House of Commons ==
Fortescue worked as a whip in Edward Heath's government between 1970 and 1973. In a 1995 BBC documentary, Westminster's Secret Service, he said the following about what the Whips would do for MPs who were in danger of being mired in scandal:

For anyone with any sense, who was in trouble, would come to the whips and tell them the truth, and say now, I’m in a jam, can you help? It might be debt, it might be… a scandal involving small boys, or any kind of scandal in which, erm er, a member seemed likely to be mixed up in, they’d come and ask if we could help and if we could, we did. And we would do everything we can because we would store up brownie points… and if I mean, that sounds a pretty, pretty nasty reason, but it’s one of the reasons because if we could get a chap out of trouble then, he will do as we ask forever more.

== Death ==
Fortescue died in 2008 aged 92.

Parliament of the United Kingdom
Preceded by Richard Bingham	Member of Parliament for Liverpool Garston; 1966 – February 1974	Succeeded by Edward Loyden
