= Belle Vale Park =

Small family park in the Belle Vale area of Liverpool

Coordinates: 53°23′22.7″N 2°51′23.1″W

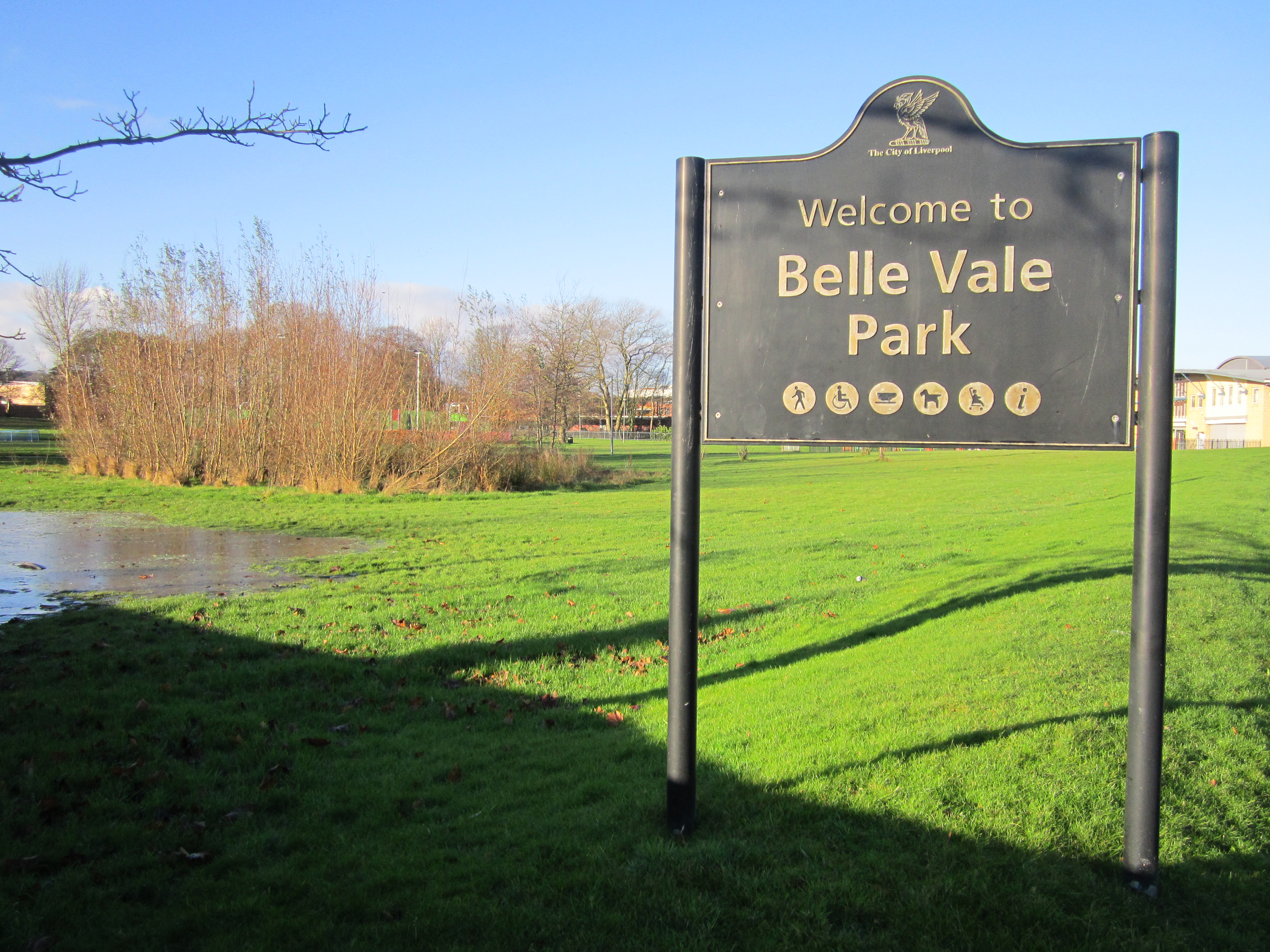
- Belle Vale Park Welcome Sign
- Interactive map of Belle Vale Park
- Type: Public Park
- Location: Belle Vale, Liverpool
- Operator: Liverpool City Council
- Open: All year

Belle Vale Park is a small family park in the Belle Vale area of Liverpool. The park is also home to the Lee Valley Millennium Centre

Belle Vale Park is the only public open space in Belle Vale, providing a setting for a range of recreational and cultural facilities for local residents. Areas of grassland with stands of mature trees, a children’s play area, a multi-use game court and informal football and tennis provisions are surrounded by the local shopping centre, supermarket, fast food outlets, and the Millennium Centre. To develop the educational and recreational links between the community and the park grounds, maintenance and Parks teams are working on projects with the community to enhance and promote Belle Vale Park. These include the addition of horticultural features, an ecological wetland area and the development of a woodland understory.

It was recently awarded a Green Flag Award for the quality and management of the park.
