= Gateacre =

Suburb of Liverpool, England

Coordinates: 53.3831°N 2.861°W

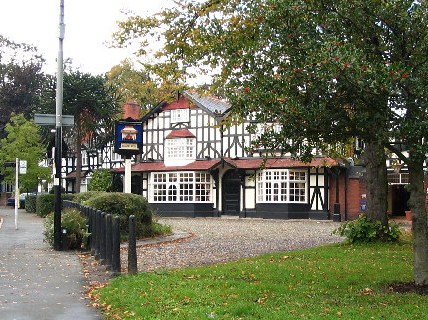
- The Black Bull pub in Gateacre Village

- Location within Merseyside
- OS grid reference: SJ428877
- Metropolitan borough: City of Liverpool
- Metropolitan county: Merseyside
- Region: North West
- Country: England
- Sovereign state: United Kingdom
- Post town: LIVERPOOL
- Postcode district: L25
- Dialling code: 0151
- Police: Merseyside
- Fire: Merseyside
- Ambulance: North West
- UK Parliament: Liverpool Garston

Gateacre (/ˈɡætəkər/; GAT-ə-kər) is a suburb of Liverpool, England, located approximately 6 miles (9.7 km) south of the city centre. It is bordered by the suburbs of Belle Vale, Childwall, and Woolton. The area is noted for its Tudor Revival architecture and contains over 100 listed buildings within a quarter-mile of its centre, making it one of the most important historic areas in the city.

Gateacre can trace back its roots to at least the 1100s, although it was not until the mid-1600s that the name was first used to refer to the area. It remained a primarily rural village until the 1800s, when it began to grow rapidly as new transport links and businesses developed. Gateacre was officially absorbed into Liverpool in 1913, but did not become part of the city's metropolitan area until the post-war period. In the 1950s and 1960s, large scale housing developments occurred in and around Gateacre, with Gateacre Community Comprehensive School and a shopping centre being built. In order to protect the area's historic buildings, Gateacre was declared a conservation area in 1969, becoming one of the first in Liverpool.

== History ==
=== Toponymy ===
The name Gateacre was first used in the mid-16th century to refer to the area that had previously been part of the townships of 'Little' and 'Much' Woolton. The origin of the name is not fully known, although there are two parallel theories on where it may have come from. The first explanation suggests that the name may derive from 'gata' – meaning path or 'the way' in Middle English – to the 'acre field' of Much Woolton (which approximately encompasses what is modern day Woolton). An alternative suggestion is that the name may have developed from the Anglo-Saxon term gāt-æcer, which means a "newly cultivated plot where goats are kept".

=== Origins and early history ===
The origins of modern-day Gateacre date back to at least the 12th century, to the historic townships of Much Woolton and Little Woolton. Much Woolton was centred on the nearby village of Woolton, with Little Woolton covering an almost entirely rural area adjacent to it. The area that would later become Gateacre was situated on the boundary between the two townships. The present day Halewood Road and Grange Lane approximately sit on the path of a former packhorse trail, which went from Hale to West Derby.

The ownership of the land changed numerous times over the next several hundred years, with Gateacre remaining a primarily rural area. There are records of several buildings and tenants on the land, although it wasn't until the mid 16th century that Gateacre was referred to, as a place in its own right.

The oldest surviving buildings in Gateacre are Grange Lodge, which dates to the late 17th century, and the Unitarian Chapel, which was built in 1700 for the local English Presbyterian congregation. Although Gateacre remained a mainly rural area until the nineteenth century, maps from the eighteenth century do show the crossroads in the centre of the Village. Subsequently, Gateacre was likely a central point for travellers across the region and it is during this period that both the Black Bull and Bear & Ragged Staff (today known as just the Bear and Staff) Inns emerged, providing shelter and accommodation for those travelling through the village.

=== Nineteenth century and rapid growth ===
During the late 18th and early 19th centuries, Gateacre became a rural retreat for the wealthy business classes of Liverpool, Widnes or Warrington. Villas and rural cottages were constructed during this time, using sandstone and brick from the local quarry in Woolton, and many of these buildings survive.

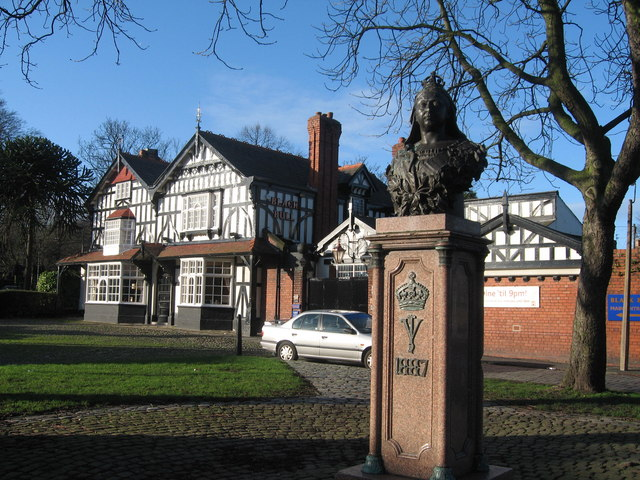
The Jubilee Memorial is located on Gateacre's village green, in front of the Black Bull pub

Gateacre began to grow as a village in the 19th century. Employment in the area expanded beyond agriculture, with the opening of the Gateacre Brewery mid-century and a local telephone exchange in 1889. Gateacre railway station also opened in 1879, on the Cheshire Lines Committee's North Liverpool Extension Line, providing the area with a direct link to Liverpool Central station. It was during this period that there was a shift in architectural styling, with mock-Tudor becoming popular.

In the mid-to-late nineteenth century, several notable residents moved into Gateacre, including Sir Andrew Barclay Walker (the man who built the Walker Art Gallery as a gift to Liverpool) and John Hays Wilson (who was the Chairman of the Liverpool Council Water Committee). In 1877, Walker provided land adjacent to Halewood Road for the construction of a new Church of England school, with the school's previous premises on Grange Lane being converted into a reading room (The building is today home to the Gateacre Institute). Following Wilson's death in 1881, the people of Gateacre erected the Wilson Memorial Fountain in honour of his work for Liverpool. The monument was located in a prominent position on the village green, which was at the time owned by Walker. In 1887, four years after the monument was erected, Walker decided to give the green to the local council, in commemoration of Queen Victoria's Golden Jubilee. He commissioned his nephew Count Gleichen to sculpt a bronze bust of the Queen to be placed upon it.

=== Twentieth century and incorporation into Liverpool ===
Gateacre was officially absorbed into Liverpool in 1913, although the area was at the time still relatively rural. In the 1930s, Alderman John Village Gardens was designated. In the post-war period and, in particular, the 1960s, large scale housing developments occurred throughout Gateacre. New housing estates were developed off Grange Lane, while the increased demand for rehousing in the city led to the construction of cheap pre-fabricated housing around Belle Vale Road. In 1957, Gateacre Comprehensive School (today known as Gateacre Community Comprehensive School), the UK's first purpose-built comprehensive school opened on Grange Lane. The school relocated to Belle Vale in 2011.

As the urban sprawl of Liverpool continued, a new shopping centre was constructed in what is now Belle Vale and the area was soon engulfed within the city. In order to protect the area's historic buildings, Gateacre was subsequently designated a conservation area in the city, whilst the natural assets around Gateacre Grange were protected through the city's first tree preservation order. On 15 April 1972, Gateacre railway station closed to passengers, with the last freight trains running along the line in 1975. Despite hopes that the station would be re-opened, the tracks were removed in 1979 and the line now forms part of the Trans Pennine Trail.

In 2008, as part of Liverpool's year-long celebrations as the European Capital of Culture, Gateacre became home to Tudorlambanana, one of 125 replica Superlambananas created throughout the city. Located in the centre of Gateacre Village, Tudorlambanana was designed by students at Gateacre Community Comprehensive School based upon the distinct mock Tudor architecture in the area.

== Description ==
Gateacre is today a largely affluent suburb of Liverpool, containing mainly residential premises. Housing is primarily a mix of large detached and semi-detached properties, although older terraced housing remains, particularly around Gateacre Village. More recent developments, such as Woodsome Park on the site of the former Gateacre Hall Hotel, have increased the number of apartment properties in the area. The majority of the housing dates from the post-war period, particularly the 1960s, when the area grew into and became part of the Liverpool conurbation.

== Architecture ==
The variety of architectural styles in Gateacre is considerable and is reflective of the long history of the area. Due to the array of styles and the fact that many of the original buildings survive, Gateacre was designated a conservation area within the city of Liverpool in 1969, one of the first in the country. In total there are over 100 listed buildings within a quarter-mile radius of the village centre, making the area one of the most important historic locations in the city.

Generally the majority of buildings in and around the village date from the early nineteenth century, although there are buildings that date as far back as the late seventeenth century. The area's proximity to the sandstone quarry in Woolton (the same material from which Liverpool's Anglican Cathedral was constructed) means this is the dominant building material along with red brick and slate for the roofs. In the late nineteenth century the 'black-and-white' or 'Mock Tudor' style became more common and is today synonymous with the area.

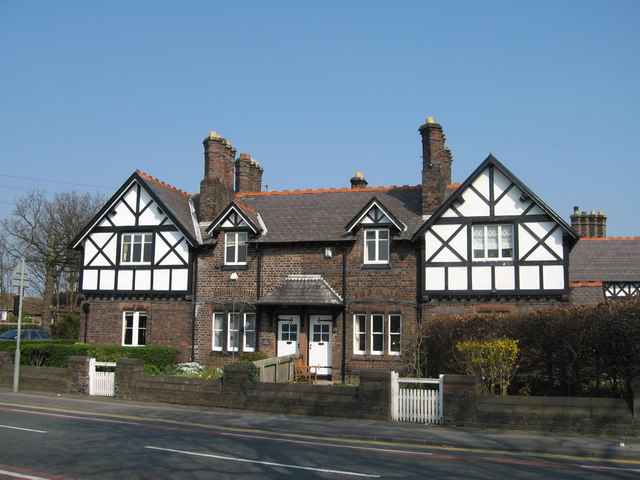
The Church Cottages on Belle Vale Road are an example of mock-Tudor design that Gateacre is known for

Gateacre Brow is noted for its late-Georgian and early-Victorian era villas, which were constructed to be different from, yet complementary to, the neighbouring buildings. Built from sandstone ashlar, the villas complement more moderate brick built houses that were constructed during the same period. Also on Gateacre Brow are several slightly modified ashlar houses that have mock-Tudor facades, all of which are Grade II listed buildings.

Grange Lane, which is home to the area's oldest building, Grange Lodge, is noted for a series of cottage and farm buildings. The oldest of these, the Grade II listed Paradise Cottages, were built at the beginning of the eighteenth century from rough sandstone, with ashlar lintels above the windows and boarded and studded doors. Also Grade II listed are the York cottages, which were built in the early nineteenth century. Set back from the road itself, the buildings are noted for their arched doors, blind fanlights and sliding sash windows. A later addition were the Soarer Cottages, which were constructed by William Hall Walker (later Baron Wavertree) in 1896. These model cottages were built adjacent to a series of polo stables, which are today known as Grange Mews, that had been constructed for Walker in 1895. The Soarer cottages were designed in Tudor Style with an open front courtyard and built from brick, with panelled stone-mullioned windows.

On Belle Vale Road, on land adjacent to the Church of St. Stephen are the Church Cottages. Built in the late-nineteenth century the cottages were built from a combination of timber and brick in mock-Tudor style. One of their most noted features are the large diagonally set chimneys. Also on Belle Vale Road are a series of early-nineteenth century houses built from sandstone ashlar with slate roofs.

=== Buildings ===
Name	Image	Description	Ref(s)
The Black Bull Public House		The Black Bull Public House is located in the centre of Gateacre Village overlooking the village green. The building, which has a half-timber frame and is designed in mock-Tudor style, has a cobbled forecourt adjacent to the green, and is generally recognised as the symbol of Gateacre. It is believed to have been originally constructed during the eighteenth century, providing shelter and accommodation for travellers passing through the area. The pub was extensively redeveloped at the end of the nineteenth century by Sir Andrew Barclay Walker, when it was given its current look.	
The Church of St. Stephen		The Church of St. Stephen is located on Belle Vale road and was constructed between 1872 and 1874. It was designed by the architect Cornelius Sherlock, who also designed the Picton Reading Room on William Brown Street in the city centre. The church was built from local sandstone and has a tall octagonal tower on one side that at one time would have dominated the skyline (today the church is surrounded by housing so it is less imposing). The building's exterior is adorned with Gothic style decorations, whilst the stained glass windows in the church were provided by the architect and designer William Morris.	
Clegg's Felt Factory		The Clegg's felt factory (formally the Gateacre Brewery) sits at the bottom of Gateacre Brow opposite the village green and was built around the late 1860s or early 1870s. A grade II listed building, it was originally a Brewery until the 1920s when it was converted into a felt factory. Clegg's ceased operating from the factory in 2003. The building is three storeys high and was built using a variety of coloured bricks. In 2005 plans were submitted to convert the building into a series of residential apartments. As the building is listed, part of the redevelopment has seen restoration of many of the original Victorian features.	
Gateacre Unitarian Chapel		The Gateacre Unitarian chapel building is situated on Gateacre Brow, just up from the village green. It was constructed in 1700, making it one of the oldest church buildings in Liverpool, being further expanded in 1719. Like many other buildings in Gateacre, it was built from sandstone from the local quarry in Woolton. Alongside the chapel is a small graveyard and the smaller Chapel Hall, which bears a significant resemblance to the main building itself.	
No. 28 Gateacre Brow		No. 28 Gateacre Brow sits on the corner of the junction with Sandfield Road. It was built in 1889 by the National Telephone Company to house a local telephone exchange. The Grade II listed building was designed by the architect Walter Aubrey Thomas, who is more famously known as the architect of The Liver Building. The building came under the ownership of the General Post Office in 1911, although it remained a manned telephone exchange until 1946, when an automated system was installed. During the early-to-mid twentieth century the building was also home to several financial institutions including Parr's Bank (which in 1920 became part of Westminster Bank) and later with the Prudential Assurance Company. The building's ground floor was constructed using locally sourced red sandstone, with brackets supporting the plaster and timber upper levels. On the north-west corner of the building is an octagonal turret with bell shaped roof, which is one of its most noted features. The building's mock-Tudor facade is decorated with 3-dimensional plaster panels that depict various stories from the bible.	
The Wilson Memorial Fountain		The Wilson Memorial Fountain was built in 1883 by the people of Gateacre in honour of John Hays Wilson, the chairman of the Liverpool Water Authority. It was built in recognition of the development of water supplies in Liverpool, in particular due to the construction of a reservoir at Lake Vyrnwy in North Wales. The open-sided octagonal monument surrounds a drinking fountain and is noted for the sculpted panels that adorn its sides. The intricate designs include many mythical creatures such as dragons, gargoyles, mermaids and the liver bird, the symbol of Liverpool.	

== Notable people ==
- Peter Serafinowicz (born 1972), comedian and actor, born in Gateacre

== Bibliography ==
- Moscardini, Anthony (2008). Woolton & Gateacre: Architecture and Heritage. Bluecoat Press. ISBN 978-1-904438-43-4.
