= Eddie Loyden =

British politician

Edward Loyden (3 May 1923 – 27 April 2003), known as Eddie Loyden, was a British Labour politician.

Loyden was Member of Parliament (MP) for Liverpool Garston from February 1974 until he lost the seat to the Conservatives in May 1979. However, favourable boundary changes allowed him to be re-elected in 1983, and he remained MP for Liverpool Garston until he retired in 1997.

== Early years ==
He was born in 1923 into a large, working-class family living in Portland Street off Vauxhall Road, Liverpool. His father Patrick was a van driver for Tate and Lyle. On leaving school, Eddie worked for a cobblers in the Scotland Road area, but from a young age he wanted to be a seafarer and he would often cycle to the docks to try to get work. At the age of fifteen he got employment as a deck boy on a coaster, leaving his bike at the docks. His mother knew nothing of this until she received a telegram from his new employer.

== Politics ==
He spent the Second World War in the Merchant Navy and saw many friends perish at sea. After the war he worked for the Mersey Dock and Harbour Board and became chairman of his branch of the Powers Workers Union, later part of the Transport and General Workers Union.

He joined the Labour Party and was elected to Liverpool City Council in 1960. His maiden speech focused on the plight of the unemployed and the poor housing conditions that still existed in the City of Liverpool. He was involved in the seamen's strike of 1966, despite Harold Wilson’s denigration of the strikers as a "tightly knit group of politically motivated men".

In 1974 Loyden was elected MP for the Garston area of Liverpool, a former traditional Tory seat. His majority was small, and he lost the seat to Malcolm Thornton in 1979 and went on to be elected as City Councillor for the St Mary's ward in Garston, going on to become deputy Leader of the City Council. In 1983 he was re-elected to Parliament, and also in 1987 with a vastly increased majority. In the 1980s and 1990s he campaigned for the families of the seamen of the MV Derbyshire, which sank in Typhoon Orchid in 1980. He retired in 1997.

He died in 2003 from Alzheimer's disease aged 79.

Parliament of the United Kingdom
Preceded by Tim Fortescue	Member of Parliament for Liverpool Garston; Feb 1974–1979	Succeeded by Malcolm Thornton
Preceded by Malcolm Thornton	Member of Parliament for Liverpool Garston; 1983–1997	Succeeded by Maria Eagle
