= Victor Raikes =

British politician

- Born: Henry Victor Alpin MacKinnon Raikes; 19 January 1901
- Died: 18 April 1986 (aged 85)
- Occupation: Conservative politician.

Sir Henry Victor Alpin MacKinnon Raikes KBE (19 January 1901 – 18 April 1986) was a British Conservative politician.

Raikes was the son of Henry St. John Digby Raikes, eldest son of Henry Cecil Raikes. His mother was Annie Lucinda (née Mackinnon). Educated at Westminster School and Trinity College, Cambridge, he unsuccessfully contested Ilkeston in 1924 and 1929 before being elected for South East Essex in 1931. During World War II he served as a flight lieutenant in the Royal Air Force.

In 1945 Raikes was elected as Member of Parliament (MP) for Liverpool Wavertree. In 1950, 1951, and 1955 he was elected for Liverpool Garston. He left office in 1957 and was replaced by Richard Martin Bingham in a by-election.

== Sources ==
- Times Guide to the House of Commons

Parliament of the United Kingdom
Preceded by Jack Oldfield	Member of Parliament for South East Essex; 1931–1945	Succeeded by Ray Gunter
Preceded by Peter Stapleton Shaw	Member of Parliament for Liverpool Wavertree; 1945–1950	Succeeded by John Tilney
New constituency	Member of Parliament for Liverpool Garston; 1950–1957	Succeeded by Richard Bingham
Party political offices
Preceded by John Biggs-Davison	Chairman of the Monday Club; March 1976 – May 1978	Succeeded by Sir Patrick Wall
