= Richard Bingham (Conservative politician) =

British barrister, politician and judge (1915–1992)

Richard Martin Bingham, TD, QC (26 October 1915 – 26 July 1992) was a British barrister and politician who later served as a judge.

== Education and Army career ==
Educated at Harrow and Clare College, Cambridge, Bingham was a Major in the Royal Artillery during the Second World War. However, he found the time to finish his legal training and was called to the Bar (Inner Temple) in 1940. His wartime service included Dunkirk and north-western Europe; he was mentioned in dispatches in 1944. He had been in the Territorial Army since 1937, where he served with the 59th Medical Regiment until 1949; he held the rank of Major from 1945.

== Politics ==
He did not begin legal practice until demobilised in 1946, when he joined the Northern Circuit. In the same year he was elected as a Conservative Party member of Liverpool City Council, on which he served for three years. In 1957, Bingham was elected to Parliament as Conservative MP for Liverpool Garston at a byelection.

== Legal career ==
The author of a standard work on negligence cases, his legal career progressed with appointment as Recorder of Oldham in 1960, and as a 'Bencher' of the Inner Temple in 1964. Bingham became a Judge of Appeal on the Isle of Man in 1965 and was also appointed to a Home Office departmental committee on Coroners. Bingham stood down from Parliament at the 1966 general election, and was appointed to the Royal Commission on Assizes and Quarter Sessions.

In 1972 Bingham was appointed a Circuit Judge and resigned his post on the Isle of Man. He served as a Judge for 16 years.

Parliament of the United Kingdom
Preceded by Victor Raikes	Member of Parliament for Liverpool Garston; 1957–1966	Succeeded by Tim Fortescue
Legal offices
Preceded by Joseph Cantley	Judge of Appeal for the Isle of Man; 1965–1972	Succeeded by Cecil Clothier
