= Belle Vale (Liverpool ward) =

Metropolitan borough council ward in England

Coordinates: 53.3909°N 2.8609°W

- Belle Vale ward within Liverpool
- Population: 13,653 (2021 census)
- Registered Electors: 4,385 (2023 elections)
- Metropolitan borough: City of Liverpool
- Metropolitan county: Merseyside
- Region: North West
- Country: England
- Sovereign state: United Kingdom
- UK Parliament: Liverpool Garston
- Councillors: Lynnie Hinnigan (Labour); Ruth Bennett (Labour)

Belle Vale is an electoral division of Liverpool City Council in the Liverpool Garston Parliamentary constituency.

== Background ==
The ward was formed in 2004 and the boundaries were altered in 2023. From 2023 the ward is represented by two councillors.

=== 2004 boundaries ===
2004 ward boundaries

A review by the Boundary Committee for England recommended that the council was formed of a reduced number of 90 members elected from 30 wards. The Belle Vale was created from the former Netherley and Valley wards.

The ward boundaries followed the city boundary and the North Liverpool Extension Line.

The population of the 2004 ward at the 2011 census was 15,004, and at the 2021 census was 15,613.

=== 2023 boundaries ===
A 2022 review by the Local Government Boundary Commission for England decided that the existing 30 wards, each represented by three councillors should be replaced by 64 wards represented by 85 councillors with varying representation by one, two or three councillors per ward. The Belle Vale ward was varied as a smaller, two-member ward, retaining most of the former Belle Vale ward, losing small sections to the new Gateacre and Childwall wards.

== Councillors ==
Election	Councillor	Councillor	Councillor
2004	Pauline Walton (Lab)	Ian Phillips (LD)	Thomas Marshall (LD)
2006	Pauline Walton (Lab)	Ian Phillips (LD)	Thomas Marshall (LD)
2007	Pauline Walton (Lab)	Janet Kent (Lab)	Thomas Marshall (LD)
2008	Pauline Walton (Lab)	Janet Kent (Lab)	Claire Wilner (Lab)
2010	Pauline Walton (Lab)	Janet Kent (Lab)	Claire Wilner (Lab)
2011	Pauline Walton (Lab)	Janet Kent (Lab)	Claire Wilner (Lab)
2012	Pauline Walton (Lab)	Janet Kent (Lab)	Claire Wilner (Lab)
2014	Pauline Walton (Lab)	Janet Kent (Lab)	Claire Wilner (Lab)
2015	Pauline Walton (Lab)	Janet Kent (Lab)	Claire Wilner (Lab)
2016	Pauline Walton (Lab)	Helen Thompson (Lab)	Ruth Bennett (Lab)
2018	Pauline Walton (Lab)	Helen Thompson (Lab)	Ruth Bennett (Lab)
2019	Pauline Walton (Lab)	Helen Thompson (Lab)	Ruth Bennett (Lab)
2021	Pauline Walton (Lab)	Helen Thompson (Lab)	Ruth Bennett (Lab)
WARD REFORMED
2023	Lynnie Hinnigan (Lab)	Ruth Bennett (Lab)	

indicates seat up for re-election after boundary changes.

indicates seat up for re-election.

indicates change in affiliation.

indicates seat up for re-election after casual vacancy.

== Election results ==
=== Elections of the 2020s ===
After the boundary change of 2023 the whole of Liverpool City Council faced election. Two councillors were returned.

4th May 2023
Party	Candidate	Votes	%	±%
**Labour**	**Lynnie Hinnigan (Note: Lynnie Hinnigan was a re-standing councillor for Cressington ward.)**	**1,645**	**37.63**	
**Labour**	**Ruth Bennett (Note: Ruth Bennett was a re-standing councillor for the former Belle Vale ward.)**	**1,547**	**35.39**	
Independent	Rev Jane McKelvey	387	8.85	
Liberal Democrats	Stephen David Atkinson	256	5.86	
Independent	Malvern Dean Hanlon	224	5.12	
Green	Alvaro Jose Costela Sanchez	171	3.91	
Liberal Democrats	Adam Kenneth Fitzgibbon	141	3.23	
Majority		1,258		
Turnout				
Rejected ballots		14		
Total votes				
Registered electors		4,385		
Labour **win** (new seat)				
Labour **win** (new seat)				

Liverpool City Council Municipal Elections 2021: 6th May 2021
Party	Candidate	Votes	%	±%
**Labour**	**Ruth Bennett**	**2,155**	**68.43**	**▼2.19**
Liberal Democrats	Stephen David Atkinson	477	14.19	▲7.57
Conservative	Wendy Rose Hine	220	6.99	▲3.41
Green	Hilary Brenda McDonagh	213	6.76	▲0.94
Freedom Alliance. No Lockdowns	Neil Sheppard	67	2.13	N/A
Liberal	Marjorie Peel	47	1.49	▲0.55
Majority		1,708	54.24%	▼6.02
Turnout		3,206	27.30%	▲1.36
Registered electors		11,745		
Rejected ballots		57	1.78%	▲1.38
Labour **hold**		Swing	-4.88	

=== Elections of the 2010s ===
Liverpool City Council Municipal Elections 2019: 2nd May 2019
Party	Candidate	Votes	%	±%
Labour	**Helen Thompson**	**2,113**	**70.62%**	▼11.99
UKIP	Douglas Anthony Boffey	310	10.36%	N/A
Liberal Democrats	Stephen David Atkinson	198	6.62%	▼0.66
Green	Hilary Brenda McDonagh	174	5.82%	▲2.80
Conservative	Wendy Rose Hine	107	3.58%	▼2.23
Socialist Alternative	Roy Dixon	62	2.07%	N/A
Liberal	Marjorie Peel	28	0.94%	▼0.34
Majority		1,803	60.26%	▼15.06
Turnout		3,004	25.94%	▼1.18
Registered electors		11,581		
Rejected ballots		12	0.40%	▼0.11
Labour **hold**		Swing		

Liverpool City Council Municipal Elections 2018: 3rd May 2018
Party	Candidate	Votes	%	±%
Labour	**Pauline Walton**	**2,574**	**82.61%**	▲10.97
Liberal Democrats	Stephen David Atkinson	227	7.28%	▲0.33
Conservative	Wendy Rose Hine	181	5.81%	▲1.81
Green	Hilary Brenda McDonagh	94	3.02%	▼0.91
Liberal	Marjorie Peel	40	1.28%	▼0.39
Majority		2,347	75.32%	▲10.63
Turnout		3,132	27.12%	▲2.56
Registered electors		11,547		
Rejected ballots		16	0.51%	
Labour **hold**		Swing	5.32%	

A by-election was held in 2016, alongside an ordinary election, following the resignation of Cllr Janet Kent.

Liverpool City Council Municipal Elections 2016: 5th May 2016
Party	Candidate	Votes	%	±%
Labour	**Ruth Lillian Bennett**	**2,196**	**71.64%**	−4.31%
Labour	**Helen Thompson**	**1,761**		
Liberal Democrats	Stephen Atkinson	384	6.95%	+3.51%
TUSC	Alan David Fogg	360	11.81%	+8.06%
TUSC	Roy Dixon	292		
Green	Hilary McDonagh	217	3.93%	+0.93%
Conservative	Beryl Pinnington	127	4.00%	−0.30%
Conservative	Elizabeth Ann Pearson	94		
Liberal	Damien Patrick Daly	92	1.67%	+0.61%
Majority		1,812	64.69%	−2.48%
Registered electors		11,290		
Turnout		2,773	24.56%	−40.99%
Labour **hold**		Swing		
Labour **hold**		Swing		

Liverpool City Council Municipal Elections 2015: 7th May 2015
Party	Candidate	Votes	%	±%
Labour	**Janet Kent**	**5,675**	**75.95%**	+8.79%
UKIP	Carl Sullivan	656	8.78%	−9.01%
Conservative	Ben Hachula	301	4.03%	+0.39%
TUSC	Roy Dixon	280	3.75%	−1.37%
Liberal Democrats	Ian Phillips	275	3.44%	n/a
Green	Joel Kenyon	224	3.00%	
Liberal	Damien Patrick Daly	79	1.06%	−1.10%
Majority		5,019	67.17%	+17.80%
Registered electors		11,436		
Turnout		7,496	65.55%	+34.79%
Labour **hold**		Swing	8.9%	

Liverpool City Council Municipal Elections 2014: 22nd May 2014
Party	Candidate	Votes	%	±%
Labour	**Pauline Walton**	2,307	67.16%	−14.98%
UKIP	Carl Sullivan	611	17.79%	n/a
TUSC	Roy Dixon	176	5.12%	+1.24%
Green	Julie Elizabeth Birch-Holt	141	4.10%	+0.25%
Conservative	Maria Prayle	125	3.64%	n/a
Liberal	Damien Patrick Daly	75	2.18%	−3.88%
Majority		1,696	49.37%	−26.71%
Turnout		3,435	30.76%	+0.55%
Labour **hold**		Swing		

Liverpool City Council Municipal Elections 2012: 3rd May 2012
Party	Candidate	Votes	%	±%
Labour	**Claire Wilner**	2,709	82.14%	+0.63%
Liberal	Damien Patrick Daly	200	6.06%	−3.26%
BNP	Christopher Beatson	134	4.06%	n/a
TUSC	Lynne Wild	128	3.88%	n/a
Green	Julie Elizabeth Birch-Holt	127	3.85%	−0.60%
Majority		2,209	76.08%	+3.90%
Turnout		3,298	30.21%	−5.45%
Labour **hold**		Swing	1.95%	

Liverpool City Council Municipal Elections 2011: 5th May 2011
Party	Candidate	Votes	%	±%
Labour	**Janet Irene Kent**	**3147**	**81.51%**	+20.06%
Liberal Democrats	Michael Marner	360	9.32%	−22.33%
Conservative	Paul Barber	182	4.71%	+0.08%
Green	Julie Birch-Holt	172	4.45%	+2.18%
Majority		2787	72.18%	+61.47%
Turnout		3861	35.66%	−22.62%
Labour **hold**		Swing	21.20%	

Liverpool City Council Municipal Elections 2010: Belle Vale
Party	Candidate	Votes	%	±%
Labour	**Pauline Walton**	**3811**	**61.45%**	
Liberal Democrats	Ian Philips	1963	31.65%	
Conservative	Stephen Fitzsimmons	287	4.63%	
Green	Julie Elizabeth Birch-Holt	141	2.27%	
Majority		664	10.71%	
Turnout		6202	58.28%	
Labour **hold**		Swing		

=== Elections of the 2000s ===
Liverpool City Council Municipal Elections 2008: Belle Vale
Party	Candidate	Votes	%	±%
Labour	**Claire Louise Wilner**	**1673**	**45.86%**	
Liberal Democrats	Tom Marshall	1383	37.91%	
BNP	Peter Michael Molloy	336	9.21%	
Conservative	Jack Stallworthy	111	3.04%	
Green	Mark Kendal Bowman	78	2.14%	
United Socialist	Paul Filby	67	1.84%	
Majority				
Turnout		3648	33.09%	
Labour **gain** from Liberal Democrats		Swing		

Liverpool City Council Municipal Elections 2007: Belle Vale
Party	Candidate	Votes	%	±%
Labour	**Janet Kent**	**1639**	**46.42%**	
Liberal Democrats	Ian Phillips	1505	42.62%	
Conservative	Norman Coppell	118	3.34%	
Liberal	Damien Patrick Daly	109	3.09%	
United Socialist	Paul Filby	82	2.32%	
Green	Andrea Pennington	78	2.21%	
Majority				
Turnout		3531	32.09%	
Labour **gain** from Liberal Democrats		Swing		

Liverpool City Council Municipal Elections 2006: Belle Vale
Party	Candidate	Votes	%	±%
Labour	**Pauline Walton**	**1903**	**42.24%**	
Liberal Democrats	Peter Joseph Rainford	1556	42.24%	
Liberal	Deborah Ann Mayes	131	3.56%	
Conservative	Norman Coppell	94	2.55%	
Majority				
Turnout		3684	32.36%	
Labour **hold**		Swing		

After the boundary change of 2004 the whole of Liverpool City Council faced election. Three Councillors were returned at this election.

Liverpool City Council Municipal Elections 2004: Belle Vale
Party	Candidate	Votes	%	±%
Liberal Democrats	**Thomas Marshall**	**2082**		
Liberal Democrats	**Ian Phillips**	**2911**		
Labour	**Pauline Walton**	**1859**		
Liberal Democrats	Francis O'Donoghue	1796		
Labour	Oliver Martins	1626		
Labour	Timothy Moore	1537		
Conservative	Joyce Larrosa	181		
Majority				
Turnout		4303	37.40%	

• italics denotes the sitting councillor • bold denotes the winning candidate
