= 1957 Liverpool Garston by-election =

UK Parliamentary by-election

The 1957 Liverpool Garston by-election of 5 December 1957 was held after the resignation of Conservative Party MP Sir Victor Raikes.

The seat was safe for the Conservatives, having been won at the 1955 United Kingdom general election by nearly 12,000 votes.

== Result of the previous general election ==
General election 1955: Liverpool Garston
Party	Candidate	Votes	%	±%
Conservative	Victor Raikes	28,130	63.51	−1.7
Labour	Thomas Edward Nixon	16,161	36.49	+1.7
Majority		11,969	27.02	−3.4
Turnout		44,291	71.0	−1.7
Conservative hold		Swing	-1.7	

== Result of the by-election ==
The Conservative Party held the seat.

By-election 1957: Liverpool Garston
Party	Candidate	Votes	%	±%
Conservative	Richard Bingham	15,521	49.20	−14.31
Labour	Ian Isidore Levin	11,217	35.56	−0.93
Liberal	Arthur Donald Dennis	4,807	15.24	New
Majority		3,131	13.64	−13.38
Turnout		31,545		
Conservative hold		Swing	-6.7	
