= Gateacre School =

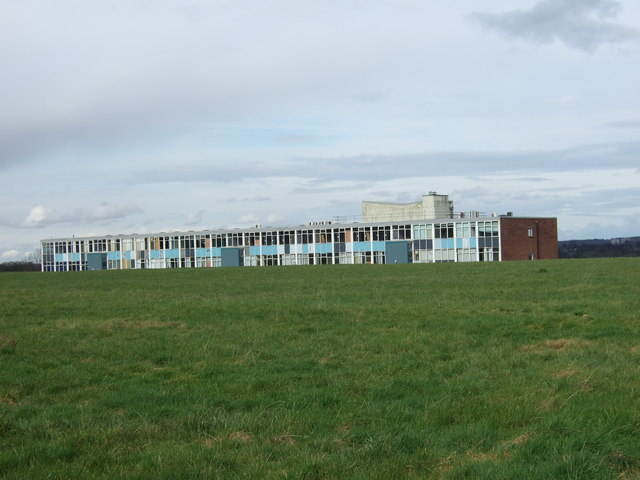

Location
- Hedgefield Road; Liverpool, Merseyside, L25 2RW; England; 53.386792°N 2.868773°W

Information
- Type: Community
- Established: 1957; 69 years ago
- Local authority: Liverpool City Council
- Department for Education URN: 104700 Tables
- Ofsted: Reports
- Head teacher: Nabil Jamil
- Gender: Coeducational
- Age: 11 to 18
- Enrolment: 1527
- Publication: Aspire Magazine
- Website: gateacre.org

Gateacre School is a secondary school and sixth form located in Belle Vale, Liverpool, England. The school is co-educational with both male and female pupils from years 7 to 11 and throughout the sixth form.

== History ==
The school was built in two phases, a lower building in 1957 (by architects Weightman and Bullen of Liverpool) and was followed by a much larger 'Main Building' which was completed in 1961 (by architect George Whitfield). The buildings on the school remained relatively unchanged for 40 years until a Music Building and a Sixth Form and Food Technology building were added to the previous 'lower yard' and bike shed area in 2002.

During the construction of the school, the playing field area needed to be levelled out. This proved difficult due to the nature of the ground, and it was decided by Liverpool Education committee that the most cost-effective method of leveling out the playing field area was controlled tipping. This led to a large difference in ground height of the field compared to the school buildings, with pupils required to walk up a set of steps equivalent to 2 storeys. This decision also meant that the land could not be built on in the future. This eventually led to the school's need to move locations under the Building Schools for the future government scheme as the only available ground on the Grange Lane site was the ground the current school footprint was held on, and a new school was required before the old one could be demolished.

Gateacre Community Comprehensive School was the first comprehensive school to open in Liverpool. It was also the first of a number of Liverpool schools to house George Whitfield's design for main building (Anfield Comprehensive and New Heys following). It was also the last remaining example of Whitfield's 'Main building'.

In 2005 Gateacre received joint in Arts & Humanities. The Specialist school status as an Arts College allowed the school extra funding for arts related utilities and projects . The three main areas of arts being performing, visual and media. The other specialism was as a Humanities College the lead subjects being English and Religious Studies.

During the school year ending August 2014 Gateacre School achieved 29% 5 A-C GCSEs including English and maths putting it in the lowest 20% of schools in the country with similar characteristics (OFSTED Dashboard for Gateacre School). In August 2015 Gateacre School achieved 32% of students gaining 5 GCSEs A-C including English and maths.

== New building ==
In 2011 the school relocated from Gateacre to the neighbouring area of Belle Vale. The new building would cost over £35 million and plans have been made to include high tech features such as solar panels, wind turbines and a cyber cafe. The new building can now be easily identified opposite Belle Vale Shopping Centre. The school website has listed what the building will include:

- A 300-seater purpose-built theatre to provide a showcase for music, drama, film and dance performances
- A music recording studio and film studio, music practice rooms, composition suite and orchestral area.
- A 4-court sports hall, with lifestyle fitness suite, dance and activity studio and teaching area
- Outdoor hard-courts, sports fields, time-trial and assault course.
- Complete Wi-Fi coverage over the entire building for anytime, anywhere computer access.
- Flexible classrooms which can be configured into different areas to enable individual tuition, small group-work, whole class activities and mass presentations.
- A suite of 10 laboratories and outdoor science garden for learning in all sciences.
- Practical technology areas, graphics and electronics studios and outdoor vocational workshop.
- An open plan arts studio area providing accommodation for fine arts, sculpture, ceramics, photography and textiles design.

== Notable alumni ==
- Katy Carmichael, actress, director and producer
- Rebecca Ferguson, singer
- Philip A. Gale, chemist and academic
- David Johnson (footballer)
- Ray Quinn, actor, singer, dancer
- Lee Sandales, BAFTA award-winning set decorator

== See also ==
List of secondary schools in Liverpool
