= Belle Vale, Liverpool =

City district

Coordinates: 53.395°N 2.861°W

Belle Vale
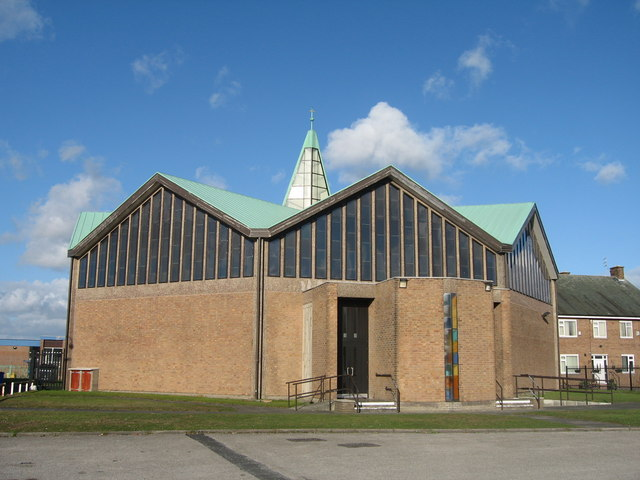
- Our Lady of the Assumption (Roman Catholic church in Belle Vale)

- Location within Merseyside
- OS grid reference: SJ337927
- Metropolitan borough: Liverpool
- Metropolitan county: Merseyside
- Region: North West
- Country: England
- Sovereign state: United Kingdom
- Post town: LIVERPOOL
- Postcode district: L25
- Dialling code: 0151
- Police: Merseyside
- Fire: Merseyside
- Ambulance: North West
- UK Parliament: Liverpool Garston

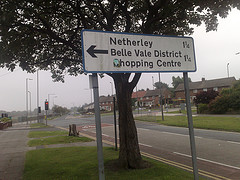
Sign indicating Belle Vale Shopping Centre from Childwall

Belle Vale is a district of south-east Liverpool, Merseyside, England and a Liverpool City Council Ward that covers both Belle Vale and Netherley.

== Description ==
The Belle Vale area shares borders with Huyton, Netherley, Gateacre and Childwall. The main road in Belle Vale is Childwall Valley Road (B5178) running from Childwall through to Netherley. The old North Liverpool Extension Line (loop line) at the back of Hartsbourne Avenue is often considered to be the border between Belle Vale and the neighbouring districts of Childwall and Gateacre.

Belle Vale District Centre has a number of amenities including a fire station, police station, health centre, large shopping centre, and also Belle Vale Park. The Belle Vale Junior football league now plays in nearby Netherley. The district is often linked with Childwall or Gateacre, which are neighbouring districts. The Belle Vale area is also divided with different housing estates having their own local names, such as Hartsbourne, Lee Park and Naylorsfield. You will also find past and modern references to the area being in Gateacre further adding to the confusion.

District signage erected by Liverpool City Council in 2005 did not include Belle Vale as a distinct district leaving the area in somewhat of a quandary. Signs were put up on Childwall Valley Road saying Gateacre (southbound towards the shopping centre and Netherley) and Childwall (northbound towards Childwall). The centre of Belle Vale effectively falls within the area identified as Gateacre by the signs, with Childwall deemed to begin north of a new school and health centre. The area's identity as Belle Vale is recognised by the names of various local amenities including the health centre, shopping centre, police station and fire station.

The postcode for Belle Vale is L25, which is also the postcode for nearby Woolton and Gateacre.

== History ==
Belle Vale was historically part of the parish of Childwall and part of the township of Little Woolton. Little Woolton was absorbed into the City of Liverpool in 1913. At the beginning of the 20th century Belle Vale was a hamlet within the rural district of Little Woolton. It consisted of cottages, farm buildings and Belle Vale Hall, an old twelve acre estate on the corner of Wambo Lane and Belle Vale Road. In 1901 Belle Vale Hall was owned by Thomas Harrison, a merchant and ship owner. Rex Harrison, the actor, who was related to the family, visited the hall when he was a boy. In the 1920s the estate became a fruit farm and traded as Belle Vale Orchards Ltd. The Hall was demolished in 1929. John Irwin Sons & Co. Ltd had a jam factory on the site in the 1930s and 1940s. After 1960 the factory produced spam, initially as Blue Cap Foods and later as Newforge. The site of the factory is now occupied by Morrisons supermarket and petrol station which opened in 2003. Part of the estate grounds survived to become Belle Vale Park.

The first church in the district was St Stephen's, Church of England, built between 1872 and 1874 in Belle Vale Road. It was initially used as a chapel of ease to Childwall church until Gateacre was made a parish in its own right in 1893 and St Stephen's became its parish church. It was designed by Liverpool architect Cornelius Sherlock who also designed Church Cottages next to the church. The cottages were built in 1880 by Sir Andrew Barclay Walker for his estate workers. The cottages remained part of the Walker estate until put up for auction in 1917. In the garden in front of the church there is a stone memorial cross inscribed with the names of those local men who died in the First World War and Second World War. The west window in the church was designed by Edward Burne-Jones for Morris & Co. and was a gift from Sir Andrew Barclay Walker in memory of his first wife who died in 1882.

Over one-thousand prefabricated homes were erected on land around the hamlet, named Belle Vale Estate Gateacre on the plans, between 1945 and 1947, to provide affordable rented accommodation for people whose homes were destroyed in bombing raids on the city during World War II, making it one of the largest Prefab communities in the country. Its most famous former resident is Sir Terry Leahy, previously chief executive of Tesco, the UK's biggest supermarket chain. Leahy is also President of the Belle Vale Prefab Project. From the mid-1960s the Prefab estate was cleared. It was replaced by new housing and a shopping centre by the mid-1970s. Our Lady's Roman Catholic church, initially built on the Prefab estate in 1949, relocated from across the road from the current location of Gateacre School playing field to Hedgefield Road in 1965. Hartsbourne, Lee Park and Naylorsfield, beyond the Prefabs, were mostly retained as farm land until the 1960s when the land was acquired for development.

Paul McCartney attended Joseph Williams Primary School, then in Sunnyfield Road on the Prefab estate, from 1949 to 1953. He travelled by bus to the school because of the shortage of school places in Speke where he lived. The site of the former school, now opposite Viennese Road and Dorchester Road, is now occupied by new housing while an adjacent site was used to build a retirement living development called Joseph Williams Mews.

Jodie Comer started acting at a weekend drama school called CALS Theatre School run by Carol Wilson in Belle Vale Shopping Centre when she was about 11 years old. Every Saturday she did an hour each of singing, dancing and acting.

== Education ==
Schools in Belle Vale include Childwall Valley Primary School, Belle Vale Community Primary School, Our Lady of the Assumption Roman Catholic Primary School and Belle Vale Sure Start.

Gateacre School relocated to land off Hedgefield Road, including part of the former Reggie Smith Playing Fields, in 2011. The move funded by the Building Schools For The Future scheme cost £30 million. The football facilities formerly on the site were relocated to a new centre at nearby Caldway Drive in Netherley.

== Places of worship ==
- St Stephen's, Church of England, Belle Vale Road, "Gateacre", Liverpool, L25 2PQ
- St Mark's, Church of England, Cranwell Road, "Childwall Valley", Liverpool, L25 1NZ
- Our Lady of the Assumption, Roman Catholic, Hedgefield Road, "Gateacre", Liverpool, L25 2RW
- Carmel Mar Thoma Church, Cockshead Road, Liverpool, L25 2RB
- Salvation Army, Liverpool Valley Corps, Mildenhall Road, Liverpool, L25 2SN

== Football ==
Gateacre School is the home of West Cheshire League Division Three side Gateacre F.C. who were founded in 2012. There are also many people who go to the Simpson Academy not to far from this area

== Transport ==
Belle Vale has its own small bus interchange next to the shopping centre on Hedgefield Road, connecting to, among other areas, Huyton and St Helens eastbound and Woolton, Halewood, Garston and Speke southbound. From May 2012 it briefly gained a service to Liverpool city centre, but lost it from January 2013 when the service was extended to Netherley and reverted to using stops on nearby Childwall Valley Road, along with other services between Liverpool city centre and Halewood or Widnes. However this interchange still proves useful as it is a key timing point and houses a bus station close by.

The area has not had a train service since Gateacre railway station closed in 1972; the disused railway trackbed has been converted into a cycle and pedestrian path from Aintree to Halewood, forming part of the Trans Pennine Trail.
