= Hunt's Cross =

Suburb of Liverpool, England

Coordinates: 53.360°N 2.854°W

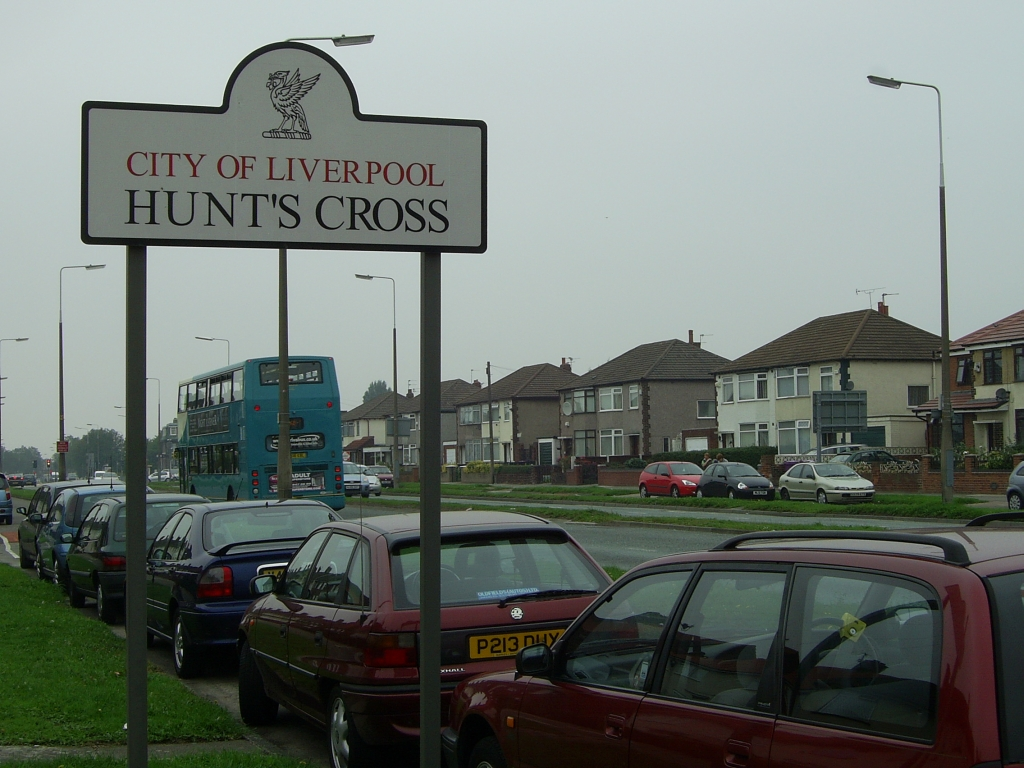
- Hillfoot Avenue

- Location within Merseyside
- OS grid reference: SJ432852
- Metropolitan borough: City of Liverpool
- Metropolitan county: Merseyside
- Region: North West
- Country: England
- Sovereign state: United Kingdom
- Post town: LIVERPOOL
- Postcode district: L25
- Dialling code: 0151
- Police: Merseyside
- Fire: Merseyside
- Ambulance: North West
- UK Parliament: Liverpool Garston

Hunt's Cross is a suburb of Liverpool, England. It is located on the southern edge of the city, bordered by the suburbs of Woolton, Allerton, Speke and the town of Halewood in the neighbouring Metropolitan Borough of Knowsley.

== History ==
Hunt's Cross was the name given to the ancient cross-roads at Speke Road, Hillfoot Avenue and Woodend Avenue, which formed the southern boundary of Much Woolton. The available evidence indicates that the cross-roads was called Hunt's Cross because of fox hunts meeting there before setting off. There was also a nearby monument called 'Hunt's Folly', shown on historical maps along with Honey Hall, Woodend Farm and Rose Farm. The 'Liverpool Hunt' is commemorated by a collection of fine china tableware by Booths.

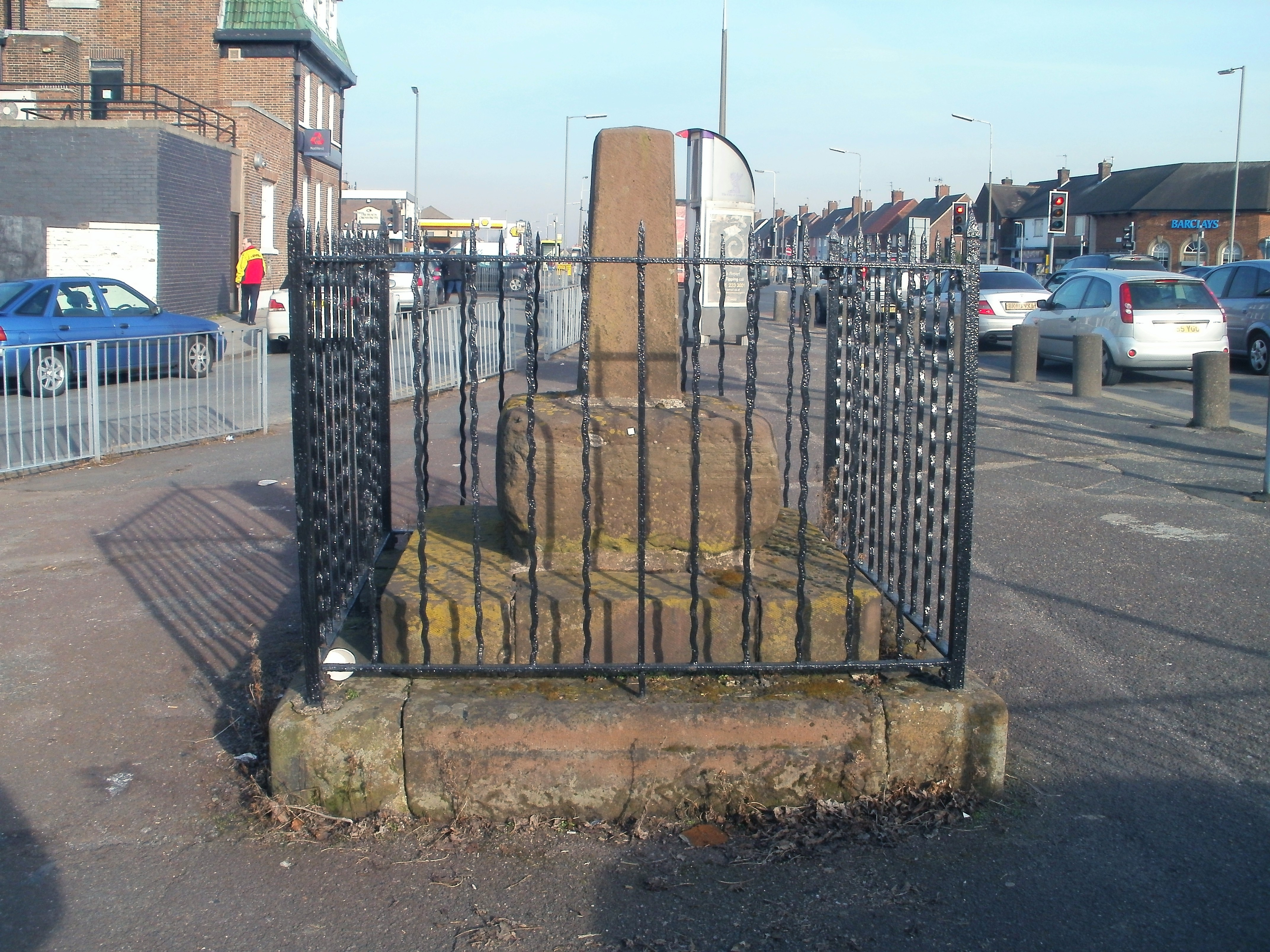
The ancient remains of the village cross

In the 1960s the medieval stone pedestal of the village cross had to be moved a short distance, to the corner of Hillfoot Road and Speke Road, to allow Hillfoot Avenue to be widened. There are similar crosses in the nearby villages of Cronton, Woolton, and Garston. Local folklore says that whoever takes the stone shall be possessed with the power of the Hunt.

== Description ==
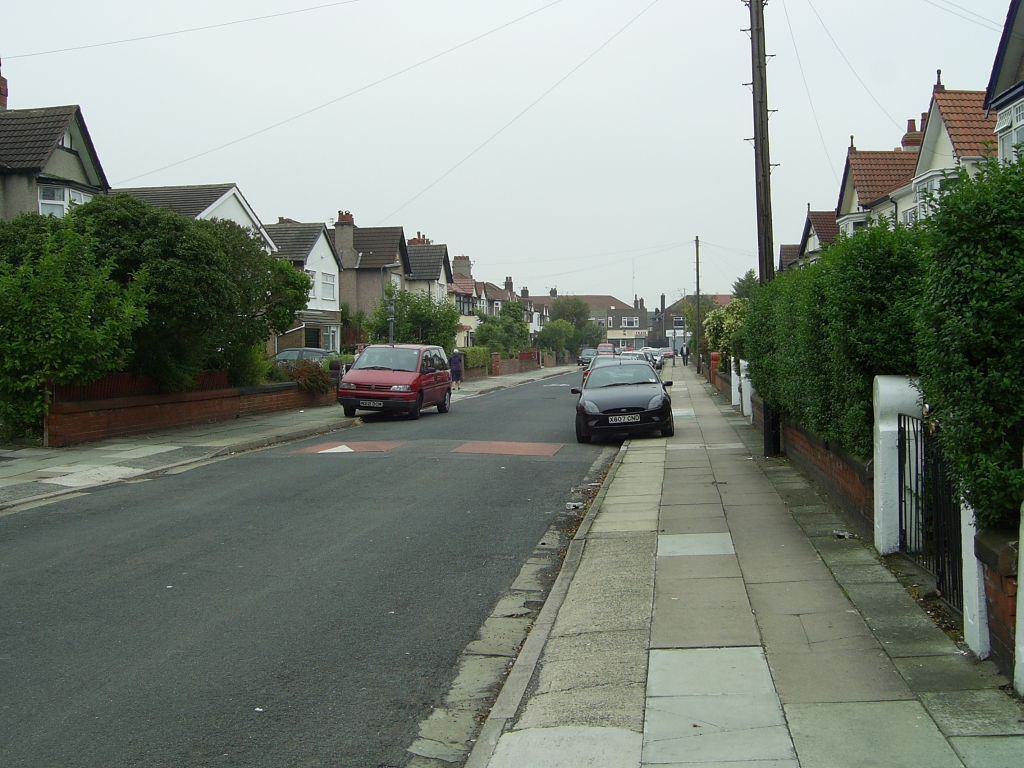
A typical local suburban street

Hunt's Cross is a typical affluent suburban area, the housing being almost entirely semi-detached or detached, much being late Victorian or Edwardian in origin, with a number of 1930s developments.

Hunt's Cross Village is located at the ancient cross-roads of Speke Road, Hillfoot Avenue and Woodend Avenue. It is one of the most complete villages in Liverpool, boasting: a Grade II listed 19th century railway station; village green; a village market square; Post Office; churches; pubs and restaurants; several banks; various and numerous shops and businesses. Hunts Cross JMI primary school is also nearby.

A large Asda supermarket can be found in the western part of the suburb, with a cafe, travel agents, fast food restaurants and other businesses in the complex. This complex is located on the site of the former Triumph Speke car factory where the TR7 sports car was produced.

Located opposite the railway station was a large house where the actress Rita Tushingham grew up, on farmland originally owned by the Tushingham family. Some of the houses built with bricks from the since-demolished house are still in existence today along Ashton Drive. The Tushinghams gave the land, where the house had stood, to the council, with the proviso that it was to be used to build a library for the community. A mobile library came here once a week up until the late 1990s when the nearby school opened up its library to the public. Subsequently, Merseytravel wanted to use this land as a bus turning circle but was stopped by Tushingham, and the Hunts Cross Residents Association, as this was in breach of contract for the land's usage.

There are two places of worship locally: St Columba's URC and St Hilda's CoE. St Andrew's RC has now been demolished and sold for housing. The 28th Allerton Scout Troop was based at St Columba's URC. It started in 1955, but has since been merged with the 33rd Allerton Scout Troop. A local drama group previously existed at St Columba's, where Rita Tushingham once performed.

== Transport ==
The area is served by Hunts Cross station, the southern terminus of the Merseyrail Northern Line to Liverpool city centre, Southport, Kirkby and Ormskirk. Northern and East Midlands Railway services also run to Manchester and Warrington.

Regular buses run along Speke Road, Hillfoot Avenue and Mackets Lane connecting with most of Liverpool, including routes into the city centre, Liverpool John Lennon Airport, Speke, and also round the ring road to East and North Liverpool.

== Notable residents ==
- Josh Bolt, actor best known for his role as Rob Dawson in Benidorm (British TV series), grew up here.
- George Harrison, composer/musician/activist and co-founder of The Beatles, lived here from 1962 to 1965.
- John Reppion, writer, husband of Leah Moore
- Rita Tushingham, actress best known for her roles in The Bed-Sitting Room and Carla Lane's Bread
- Jonathan Harvey, writer, grew up here
