= Liverpool Garston =

UK Parliament constituency (1950–2010, 2024 onwards)

- Borough constituency for the House of Commons
- Interactive map of boundaries since 2024
- Location within North West England
- County: Merseyside
- Electorate: 70,372 (March 2020)

Current constituency
- Created: 2024
- Member of Parliament: Maria Eagle (Labour)
- Seats: One
- Created from: Garston and Halewood

1950–2010
- Type of constituency: Borough constituency
- Created from: Liverpool East Toxteth; Liverpool Wavertree
- Replaced by: Garston and Halewood

Liverpool Garston is a borough constituency represented in the House of Commons of the Parliament of the United Kingdom. It elects one Member of Parliament (MP) by the first past the post system of election. The seat was first established in 1950, but was abolished in 2010, before being re-established for the 2024 general election. Between 2010 and 2024, it was replaced by Garston and Halewood.

Since its recreation in 2024, its MP is Maria Eagle of the Labour Party. She had previously been the MP from 1997 to 2010 and represented Garston and Halewood for the whole of its existence.

== Constituency profile ==
Liverpool Garston is a constituency in Merseyside. It covers the southern neighbourhoods of the city of Liverpool, including Garston, Speke, Hunt's Cross, Allerton, Woolton, Gateacre, Belle Vale and Netherley. Liverpool is a large port city with a history of slave trading and importation of goods for Lancashire's industry. The city underwent economic decline in the 1970s as the docks and manufacturing industries declined in importance, but has experienced regeneration in the 21st century. This constituency has average levels of deprivation and is the wealthiest of Liverpool's five constituencies. Netherley, Belle Vale and Speke are highly-deprived with large quantities of council housing. Speke is located next to a large industrial estate which includes the Jaguar Land Rover and Ford automotive factories, and is also next to Liverpool John Lennon Airport, all of which are significant local employers. Allerton and Gateacre are affluent and suburban in character. House prices in the constituency are higher than the rest of North West England but lower than the national average.

In general, residents of Liverpool Garston have average levels of education, homeownership, income and unemployment. A high proportion of residents work in the retail and transport sectors. White people made up 91% of the population at the 2021 census. Like the rest of Liverpool, the percentage of residents identifying as Christian is high and there is a large population of Catholics due to historic Irish migration. At the local city council, the more deprived areas of Netherley, Belle Vale and Speke are represented by Labour Party councillors, the affluent areas of Allerton, Woolton, Gateacre and Hunt's Cross by Liberal Democrats, and Garston by a local independent group. An estimated 58% of voters in Liverpool Garston supported remaining in the European Union in the 2016 referendum, higher than the nationwide figure of 48%.

== Boundaries ==
=== Historic ===
1950–1955: The County Borough of Liverpool wards of Aigburth, Allerton, Childwall, Garston, Little Woolton, and Much Woolton.

1955–1983: The County Borough of Liverpool wards of Aigburth, Allerton, St Mary's, Speke, and Woolton.

1983–1997: The City of Liverpool wards of Allerton, Netherley, St Mary's, Speke, Valley, and Woolton.

1997–2010: The City of Liverpool wards of Allerton, Grassendale, Netherley, St Mary's, Speke, Valley, and Woolton.

The constituency was one of five covering the city of Liverpool, covering the southern part of the city. As well as Garston, it contained areas such as Allerton, Netherley, Speke and Woolton. Liverpool John Lennon Airport was located in the constituency.

The Liverpool Garston seat was abolished at the 2010 general election following boundary changes. It was replaced with a new Garston and Halewood constituency, which also covered part of the Knowsley borough.

=== Current ===
Further to the 2023 review of Westminster constituencies which came into effect for the 2024 general election, the re-established constituency was defined as being composed of the following wards of the City of Liverpool as they existed on 1 December 2020:

- Allerton and Hunts Cross; Belle Vale; Church; Cressington; Speke-Garston; Woolton.

The seat comprises the (former) City of Liverpool wards previously in the abolished constituency of Garston and Halewood, with the addition of Church ward from Liverpool Wavertree.

Liverpool was subject to a comprehensive local government boundary review which came into effect in May 2023. As a result, the new constituency boundaries do not align with the revised ward boundaries. The constituency now comprises the following wards or part wards of the City of Liverpool from the 2024 general election:

- Allerton; Belle Vale; Calderstones; Childwall (small part); Church (small part); Garston; Gateacre (nearly all); Grassendale & Cressington; Mossley Hill (small part); Much Woolton & Hunts Cross; Penny Lane (majority); Speke; Springwood; Woolton Village.

== History ==
Following its 1950 creation, Liverpool Garston was initially a safe Conservative seat, being won by the party by wide margins in the 1950s. It became more marginal in the 1960s and was gained by the Labour Party for the first time at the February 1974 general election. The Conservatives regained the seat amid their national election victory in 1979, but despite retaining Conservative-leaning areas as Allerton and Woolton, boundary changes for the 1983 general election removed the middle-class, Conservative-voting Aigburth area, making the seat notionally Labour again. Labour duly won the seat in 1983 and held it with increasingly large majorities until its abolition in 2010. Its MP since 1997 had been Maria Eagle, who represented the constituency which largely replaced it, the similarly safely Labour Garston and Halewood, between 2010 and 2024, before once again representing Liverpool Garston upon its re-establishment in 2024.

== Members of Parliament ==
Year	Member	Party
1950	Victor Raikes	Conservative
1957	Richard Bingham	Conservative
1966	Tim Fortescue	Conservative
1974	Eddie Loyden	Labour
1979	Malcolm Thornton	Conservative
1983	Eddie Loyden	Labour
1997	Maria Eagle	Labour
2010	constituency abolished	
2024	Maria Eagle	Labour

== Elections ==
=== Elections in the 2020s ===
General election 2024: Liverpool Garston
Party	Candidate	Votes	%	±%
Labour	Maria Eagle	24,510	58.4	−11.8
Reform	Kiera Hubbard	4,406	10.5	+5.6
Community Independents	Sam Gorst	3,294	7.8	N/A
Liberal Democrats	John Hyland	3,239	7.7	−2.2
Conservative	Danny Bowman	2,943	7.0	−4.7
Green	Muryam Sheikh	2,816	6.7	+4.0
Liberal	Alan Tormey	401	1.0	+0.3
Independent	Jane Lawrence	272	0.7	N/A
Workers Revolutionary	Frank Sweeney	112	0.3	N/A
Majority		20,104	47.9	−10.6
Turnout		41,993	60.6	−9.2
Labour hold		Swing		

=== Elections in the 2000s ===
General election 2005: Liverpool Garston
Party	Candidate	Votes	%	±%
Labour	Maria Eagle	18,900	54.0	―7.4
Liberal Democrats	Paula Keaveney	11,707	33.5	+10.4
Conservative	Amber Rudd	3,424	9.8	―5.7
UKIP	Kevin Kearney	780	2.2	New
Workers Revolutionary	David Oatley	163	0.5	New
Majority		7,193	20.5	―17.8
Turnout		34,974	54.9	+4.7
Labour hold		Swing	―8.9	

General election 2001: Liverpool Garston
Party	Candidate	Votes	%	±%
Labour	Maria Eagle	20,043	61.4	+0.1
Liberal Democrats	Paula Keaveney	7,549	23.1	+4.1
Conservative	Helen Sutton	5,059	15.5	―0.2
Majority		12,494	38.3	―4.0
Turnout		32,651	50.2	―14.8
Labour hold		Swing	―2.0	

=== Elections in the 1990s ===
General election 1997: Liverpool Garston
Party	Candidate	Votes	%	±%
Labour	Maria Eagle	26,667	61.3	+10.2
Liberal Democrats	Flo Clucas	8,250	19.0	―2.7
Conservative	Nigel Gordon-Johnson	6,819	15.7	―9.2
Referendum	Frank Dunne	833	1.9	New
Liberal	Gary Copeland	666	1.5	―0.7
Natural Law	John Parsons	127	0.3	―0.2
Socialist Equality	Stuart Nolan	120	0.3	New
Majority		18,417	42.3	+12.1
Turnout		43,482	65.0	―5.6
Labour hold		Swing	+7.7	

General election 1992: Liverpool Garston
Party	Candidate	Votes	%	±%
Labour	Eddie Loyden	23,212	57.1	+3.5
Conservative	John Backhouse	10,933	26.9	+3.0
Liberal Democrats	Charles Roberts	5,398	13.3	―9.1
Liberal	William Conrad	894	2.2	New
Natural Law	Peter Chandler	187	0.5	New
Majority		12,279	30.2	+0.5
Turnout		40,624	70.6	―5.1
Labour hold		Swing	+0.3	

=== Elections in the 1980s ===
General election 1987: Liverpool Garston
Party	Candidate	Votes	%	±%
Labour	Eddie Loyden	24,848	53.6	+7.0
Conservative	Paul Feather	11,071	23.9	―14.0
SDP	Richard Isaacson	10,370	22.4	+6.9
Workers Revolutionary	Kevin Timlin	98	0.2	New
Majority		13,777	29.7	+21.0
Turnout		46,387	75.7	+4.1
Labour hold		Swing	+10.5	

General election 1983: Liverpool Garston
Party	Candidate	Votes	%	±%
Labour	Eddie Loyden	21,450	46.6	
Conservative	James Ross	17,448	37.9	
Liberal	Rosie Cooper	7,153	15.5	
Majority		4,002	8.7	
Turnout		46,051	71.6	
Labour hold		Swing		

Note: This constituency underwent major boundary changes in 1983 and so was notionally a hold.

=== Elections in the 1970s ===
General election 1979: Liverpool Garston
Party	Candidate	Votes	%	±%
Conservative	Malcolm Thornton	28,105	48.1	+6.0
Labour	Eddie Loyden	25,318	43.3	―4.5
Liberal	Wilfred John Davidson	4,890	8.4	―1.7
Workers Revolutionary	Terence Kelly	142	0.2	New
Majority		2,787	4.8	N/A
Turnout		58,455	73.8	+1.9
Conservative gain from Labour		Swing	+5.3	

General election October 1974: Liverpool Garston
Party	Candidate	Votes	%	±%
Labour	Eddie Loyden	27,857	47.8	+5.4
Conservative	David Charles Stanley	24,557	42.1	+0.9
Liberal	Geoffrey Howard Black	5,865	10.1	―6.3
Majority		3,300	5.7	+4.5
Turnout		58,299	71.9	―2.7
Labour hold		Swing	+2.3	

General election February 1974: Liverpool Garston
Party	Candidate	Votes	%	±%
Labour	Eddie Loyden	25,332	42.4	―0.7
Conservative	Nigel Neville Laville	24,651	41.2	―15.7
Liberal	Geoffrey Howard Black	9,834	16.4	New
Majority		681	1.2	N/A
Turnout		59,817	74.6	+8.9
Labour gain from Conservative		Swing	+7.4	

General election 1970: Liverpool Garston
Party	Candidate	Votes	%	±%
Conservative	Tim Fortescue	28,381	56.9	+2.5
Labour	Colin J. Smith	21,456	43.1	―2.5
Majority		6,925	13.8	+5.0
Turnout		49,837	65.7	―2.5
Conservative hold		Swing	+2.5	

=== Elections in the 1960s ===
General election 1966: Liverpool Garston
Party	Candidate	Votes	%	±%
Conservative	Tim Fortescue	24,716	54.4	+4.6
Labour	William H. Waldron	20,746	45.6	+9.2
Majority		3,970	8.8	―4.6
Turnout		45,462	68.2	―4.7
Conservative hold		Swing	―2.3	

General election 1964: Liverpool Garston
Party	Candidate	Votes	%	±%
Conservative	Richard Bingham	24,100	49.8	―14.7
Labour	John D. Hamilton	17,626	36.4	+0.9
Liberal	Frank Kirk	6,708	13.9	New
Majority		6,474	13.4	―15.6
Turnout		48,434	72.9	―1.5
Conservative hold		Swing	―7.8	

=== Elections in the 1950s ===
General election 1959: Liverpool Garston
Party	Candidate	Votes	%	±%
Conservative	Richard Bingham	31,441	64.5	+1.0
Labour	Brian Crookes	17,284	35.5	―1.0
Majority		14,157	29.0	+2.0
Turnout		48,725	74.4	+3.4
Conservative hold		Swing	+1.0	

1957 Liverpool Garston by-election
Party	Candidate	Votes	%	±%
Conservative	Richard Bingham	15,521	49.2	―14.3
Labour	Ian Isidore Levin	11,217	35.6	―0.9
Liberal	Arthur Donald Dennis	4,807	15.2	New
Majority		4,304	13.6	―13.4
Turnout		31,545		
Conservative hold		Swing	―6.7	

General election 1955: Liverpool Garston
Party	Candidate	Votes	%	±%
Conservative	Victor Raikes	28,130	63.5	―1.7
Labour	Thomas Edward Nixon	16,161	36.5	+1.7
Majority		11,969	27.0	―3.4
Turnout		44,291	71.0	―1.7
Conservative hold		Swing	―1.7	

General election 1951: Liverpool Garston
Party	Candidate	Votes	%	±%
Conservative	Victor Raikes	35,650	65.2	+7.6
Labour	Alf Morris	19,025	34.8	+3.2
Majority		16,625	30.4	+4.4
Turnout		54,675	80.0	―4.9
Conservative hold		Swing	+2.2	

General election 1950: Liverpool Garston
Party	Candidate	Votes	%	±%
Conservative	Victor Raikes	31,750	57.6	
Labour	Edgar Hewitt	17,477	31.6	
Liberal	Lyon Blease	5,966	10.8	
Majority		14,303	26.0	
Turnout		55,163	84.9	
Conservative win (new seat)				

== See also ==
- List of parliamentary constituencies in Merseyside
