= Common-law marriage =

Type of marriage with no formal ceremony

Common-law marriage, also known as non-ceremonial marriage, sui iuris marriage, informal marriage, de facto marriage, more uxorio, or marriage by habit and repute, is a marriage that results from the parties' agreement to consider themselves married, followed by cohabitation, rather than through a statutorily defined process. Not all jurisdictions permit common law marriage, but will typically respect the validity of such a marriage lawfully entered into in another state or country.

The original concept of a "common-law" marriage is one considered valid by both partners, but not formally recorded with a state or religious registry, nor celebrated in a formal civil or religious service. In effect, the act of the couple representing themselves to others as being married and organizing their relationship as if they were married means they are married.

The term common-law marriage (or similar) has wider informal use, often to denote relations that are not legally recognized as marriages. It is often used colloquially or by the media to refer to cohabiting couples, regardless of any legal rights or religious implications involved. This can create confusion in regard to the term and to the legal rights of unmarried partners (in addition to the actual status of the couple referred to).

== Terminology ==
Common-law marriage is a marriage that takes legal effect without the prerequisites of a marriage license or participation in a marriage ceremony. The marriage occurs when two people who are legally capable of being married, and who intend to be married, live together as a married couple and hold themselves out to the world as a married couple.

=== Common-law marriage vs. cohabitation ===
The term "common-law marriage" is often used incorrectly to describe various types of couple relationships, such as cohabitation (whether or not registered) or other legally formalized relations. Although these interpersonal relationships are often called "common-law marriage", they differ from its original meaning in that they are not legally recognized as "marriages", but may be a parallel interpersonal status such as a "domestic partnership", "registered partnership", "common law partner", "conjugal union", or "civil union". Non-marital relationship contracts are not necessarily recognized from one jurisdiction to another.

In Canada, while some provinces may extend to couples in marriage-like relationships many of the rights and responsibilities of a marriage, they are not legally considered married. They may be legally defined as "unmarried spouses" and, for many purposes such as taxes and financial claims and within those contexts, treated the same as married spouses.

A 2008 poll in the UK showed that 51% of respondents incorrectly believed that cohabitants had the same rights as married couples.

In Scotland, common-law marriage does not exist, although there was a type of irregular marriage called 'marriage by cohabitation with habit and repute' which could apply to couples in special circumstances until 2006, and was abolished by the Family Law (Scotland) Act 2006 (irregular marriages established before 4 May 2006 are recognised).

== History ==
In ancient Greece and Rome, marriages were private agreements between individuals and estates. Community recognition of a marriage was largely what qualified it as a marriage. The state had only limited interests in assessing the legitimacy of marriages. Normally, civil and religious officials took no part in marriage ceremonies and did not keep registries. There were several more or less formal ceremonies to choose from (partly interchangeable, but sometimes with different legal ramifications) as well as informal arrangements. It was relatively common for couples to cohabit with no ceremony; cohabiting for a moderate period of time was sufficient to make it a marriage. Cohabiting for the purpose of marriage carried with it no social stigma.

In medieval Europe, marriage came under the jurisdiction of canon law, which recognized as a valid marriage one in which the parties stated that they took one another as wife and husband, even in the absence of any witnesses.

The Catholic Church forbade clandestine marriage at the Fourth Lateran Council (1215), which required all marriages to be announced in a church by a priest. The Council of Trent (1545–1563) introduced more specific requirements, ruling that future marriages would be valid only if witnessed by the pastor of the parish or the local ordinary (the bishop of the diocese) or by the delegate of one of said witnesses, the marriage being invalid otherwise, even if witnessed by a Catholic priest. The Tridentine canons did not bind the Protestants or the Eastern Orthodox, but clandestine marriages were impossible for the latter since their validity required the presence of a priest.

England abolished clandestine or common-law marriages in the Marriage Act 1753, requiring marriages to be performed by a priest of the Church of England unless the participants in the marriage were Jews or Quakers. The Act applied to Wales but not to Scotland, (Note: Scotland abolished marriage by habit and repute in 2006.) which retained its own legal system by the Acts of Union 1707. To get around the requirements of the Marriage Act, such as minimum age requirements, couples would go to Gretna Green, in the south of Scotland, or other border villages such as Coldstream, to get married under Scots law. The Marriage Act 1753 also did not apply to Britain's overseas colonies of the time and so common-law marriages continued to be recognized in what are now the United States and Canada.

Contracts per verba de praesenti, sometimes known as common-law marriages, were viewed in Anglican Great Britain as promise of marriage rather than actual marriage, that required ceremony in Church before consummation, in opposition to High Middle Ages times when a couple who exchanged vows without a priest was considered to be validly married.

== Legislation ==
=== Australia ===
Australia does not have common law marriage as it is understood under common law. The term used for relationships between any two persons who are not married but are living in certain domestic circumstances, may vary between states and territories, although the term de facto relationship is often used.

Since March 1, 2009, de facto relationships have been recognized in the Family Law Act (Commonwealth), applicable in states that have referred their jurisdiction on de facto couples to the Commonwealth's jurisdiction. In Western Australia, the only state that has not referred its jurisdiction, state legislation is still valid. There is also no federal recognition of de facto relationships existing outside Australia (see Section 51(xxxvii) of the Australian Constitution), and so this is also a state matter. Regulation of de facto relations is a combination of federal and state/territory laws.

=== Canada ===
Canada does not have the institution of common-law marriage, where a couple can be legally married by living together with an intention to be married, and without a formal ceremony. However, informal cohabitation relationships are recognised for certain purposes in Canada, creating legal rights and obligations.

=== Denmark ===
§ 27 of the historical Jyske Lov, which covered Funen, Jutland, and Schleswig in the years 1241–1683, reads:

If anyone has a mistress in his home for three winters and obviously sleeps with her, and she commands lock and key and obviously eats and drinks with him, then she shall be his wife and rightful lady of the house.

=== India ===
In the case of D. Velusamy v D. Patchaiammal (2010), the Supreme Court of India defined, with reference to the Domestic Violence Act of 2005, "a relationship in the nature of marriage" as "akin to a common law marriage". The Supreme Court declared that the following are required to satisfy the conditions for a common-law marriage or a relationship in the nature of marriage:

1. Must be of marriageable age.
2. Must not be already married and be qualified to marry.
3. Must be living together in a way that seems to society that the couple is married
4. Must have cohabited for a "significant" period of time.
5. Must be living together voluntarily.

There is no specified time for the common-law marriage to actually take effect but needs it to be "significant". The case clarified that there was a difference between "live-in relationships", "a relationship in the nature of marriage", casual relationships and having a "keep". Only "a relationship in the nature of marriage" can afford the rights and protections conferred in the Domestics Violence Act of 2005 and Section 125 of the Criminal Code, which include alimony for the female partner (unless she leaves her partner for no reason, had an affair with another man, or left with a mutual understanding, in which case alimony amounts must be settled mutually), allowances, shelter and protections for the female partner in case of abuse, right to live in her partner's house and child custody. Furthermore, children born in such relationships will be granted allowances until they reach full age and, provided the person is not a married adult daughter, if the person is of full age and is handicapped. Furthermore, the Hindu Marriage Act stipulates that children born out of wedlock (including to live-in relationships, relationships in the nature of marriage and casual relationships) are treated as equivalent to legitimate children in terms of inheritance. However, the Hindu Marriage Act is only applicable if the children's parent is Hindu, Sikh, Buddhist or Jain.

=== Ireland ===
Ireland does not recognize common-law marriage, but the Civil Partnership and Certain Rights and Obligations of Cohabitants Act 2010 (in force between 2010 and 2015) gives some rights to unmarried cohabitants. Following the Marriage Act 2015 which legalized same-sex marriage in Ireland, civil partnerships are no longer available in Ireland; couples already in a civil partnership may apply to convert their civil partnership into marriage or may remain in a civil partnership which will continue to be valid, if contracted before November 2015. A constitutional amendment that would have recognised family as including unmarried 'durable' relationships, proposed in March 2024, failed by 67%.

=== Israel ===
In Israel, courts and a few statutes (such as social security which grants death and disability benefits) have recognized an institute of yeduim batsibur (ידועים בציבור) meaning a couple who are "known in the public" (lit. translation) as living together as husband and wife. Generally speaking, the couple needs to satisfy two tests which are: 1) "intimate life similar to married couple, relationship based on same emotions of affection and love, dedication and faithfulness, showing they have chosen to share their fate" (Supreme Court of Israel, judge Zvi Berenson (intimacy test)), and 2) sharing household (economic test). In addition, courts usually are more likely to recognize such relationships as marriage for granting benefits if the couple could not get married under Israeli law.

Israel's common-law status grants Israeli couples virtually the same benefits and privileges as married couples.

=== Kuwait ===
Common-law marriage or partnerships have some limited recognition in Kuwait in the cases of expatriate familial disputes such as maintenance payments and child support dues. Family courts use the law of the male partner or husband's country of nationality to deal with family matters and hence if the male partner comes from a country where partnerships or other similar unions are recognised, then a Kuwaiti court can also consider it. However, intercourse outside marriage is illegal in Kuwait so such recognition can only practically apply in exceptional cases like illegitimate children born abroad and the parents having since separated abroad but relocated to Kuwait. No recognition is extended to couples where one or both parties are Kuwaiti or to homosexual couples.

=== Soviet Union ===
In its early decades the Soviet Union, under influence of Marxist theory, viewed the nuclear family as an economic arrangement which reinforced the ideology of capitalism, and which, like other bourgeois structures, would in time wither away. To this end the 1918 Code on Marriage, the Family and Guardianship established a transitional reform of marriage, among other changes granting "no-grounds" divorce, abolishing inheritance, and extending rights of parental support to children regardless of marital status.

The Family Code of 1926 endeavored to correct perceived shortcomings of the prior code in the post-war environment, in effect turning away from the revolutionary attitude on marriage represented in the earlier code. This included the formal recognition of de facto or common law marriages. Hundreds of thousands of unemployed women did not have registered marriages and were left with no means of support or protections following a separation under the 1918 code. The 1926 code made unregistered marriages legal in order to safeguard women by extending alimony to unregistered, de facto wives, the purpose being that more women would be cared for in times of widespread unemployment (absent the communal support structures that were envisioned rendering such arrangements obsolete). Further reforms would continue bringing Soviet marriage law in line with traditional legal views, and by 1944 marriages again needed be registered, and divorce was at the discretion of the court.

=== United Kingdom ===
==== England and Wales ====
The term "common-law marriage" has been used in England and Wales to refer to unmarried, cohabiting heterosexual couples. However, this is merely a social usage. The term does not confer on cohabiting parties any of the rights or obligations enjoyed by spouses or civil partners. Unmarried partners are recognised for certain purposes in legislation: e.g., for means-tested benefits. For example, in the Jobseekers Act 1995, "unmarried couple" was defined as a man and woman who are not married to each other but who are living together in the same household as husband and wife other than in prescribed circumstances. But in many areas of the law cohabitants enjoy no special rights. Thus when a cohabiting relationship ends, ownership of any assets will be decided by property law. The courts have no discretion to reallocate assets, as occurs on divorce.

It is sometimes mistakenly claimed that before the Marriage Act 1753 cohabiting couples would enjoy the protection of a "common-law marriage," but neither the name nor the concept of "common-law marriage" was known at this time. Far from being treated as if they were married, couples known to be cohabiting risked prosecution by the church courts for fornication.

"Contract marriages" (or more strictly marriages per verba de praesenti) could be presumed, before the Marriage Act 1753, to have been undertaken by mutual consent by couples who lived together without undergoing a marriage ceremony. However, they were not understood as having the legal status of a valid marriage until the decision in Dalrymple clarified this in 1811. This decision affected the subsequent development of English law due to the fact that the Marriage Act 1753 did not apply overseas. English courts later held that it was possible to marry by a simple exchange of consent in the colonies, although most of the disputed ceremonies involved the ministrations of a priest or other clergyman.

The English courts also upheld marriages by consent in territories not under British control but only if it had been impossible for the parties to marry according to the requirements of the local law. The late 1950s and early 1960s saw a spate of cases arising out of the Second World War, with marriages in prisoner-of-war camps in German-occupied Europe posing a particular problem for judges. (Some British civilians interned by the Japanese during the Second World War were held to be legally married after contracting marriages under circumstances where the formal requirements could not be met.) To this limited extent, English law does recognise what has become known as a "common-law marriage". English legal texts initially used the term to refer exclusively to American common-law marriages. Only in the 1960s did the term "common-law marriage" begin to be used in its contemporary sense to denote unmarried, cohabiting heterosexual relationships, and not until the 1970s and 1980s did the term begin to lose its negative connotations. The use of the term is likely to have encouraged cohabiting couples to believe falsely that they enjoyed legal rights. By the end of the 1970s a myth had emerged that marrying made little difference to one's legal rights, and this may have fuelled the subsequent increase in the number of couples living together and having children together outside marriage.

==== Northern Ireland ====
As in England and Wales, there is little grounding in Northern Irish law for the concept of a common-law marriage. In the event of the death of one member the surviving partner may be able to apply for provision from the estate of the deceased partner under the Inheritance (Provision for Family and Dependants) (Northern Ireland) Order 1979. The cohabitee must be:

- living with the deceased for two years immediately prior to their death, as if they were a spouse
- dependent upon the deceased partner (if a claim for maintenance is made)

==== Scotland ====
Under Scots law, there have been several forms of "irregular marriage", among them:

1. Irregular marriage by declaration de praesenti – declaring in the presence of two witnesses that one takes someone as one's wife or husband.
2. Irregular marriage conditional on consummation
3. Marriage contracted by correspondence
4. Irregular marriage by cohabitation with habit and repute

The Marriage (Scotland) Act 1939 provided that the first three forms of irregular marriage could not be formed on or after 1 January 1940. However, any irregular marriages contracted prior to 1940 can still be upheld. This act also allowed the creation of regular civil marriages in Scotland for the first time (the civil registration system started in Scotland on 1 January 1855).

Until this act, the only regular marriage available in Scotland was a religious marriage. Irregular marriages were not socially accepted and many people who decided to contract them did so where they were relatively unknown. In some years up to 60% of the marriages in the Blythswood Registration District of Glasgow were "irregular".

In 2006, "marriage by cohabitation with habit and repute", the last form of irregular marriage that could still be contracted in Scotland, was abolished in the Family Law (Scotland) Act 2006. Until that act had come into force, Scotland remained the only European jurisdiction never to have totally abolished the old-style common-law marriage. For this law to apply, the time the couple had lived together continuously had to exceed 20 days.

As in the American jurisdictions that have preserved it, this type of marriage can be difficult to prove. It is not enough for the couple to have lived together for several years, but they must have been generally regarded as husband and wife. Their friends and neighbors, for example, must have known them as Mr. and Mrs. So-and-so (or at least they must have held themselves out to their neighbors and friends as Mr. and Mrs. So-and-so). Also, like American common-law marriages, it is a form of lawful marriage, so that people cannot be common-law spouses, or husband and wife by cohabitation with habit and repute, if one of them was legally married to somebody else when the relationship began.

It is a testament to the influence of American legal thought and English colloquial usage that, in a study conducted by the Scottish Executive in 2000, 57% of Scots surveyed believed that couples who merely live together have a "common-law marriage". In fact, that term is unknown in Scots law, which uses "marriage by cohabitation with habit and repute".

Otherwise, men and women who otherwise behave as husband and wife did not have a common-law marriage or a marriage by habit and repute merely because they set up housekeeping together, but they must have held themselves out to the world as husband and wife. (In many jurisdictions, they must do so for a certain length of time for the marriage to be valid.) The Scottish Survey is not clear on these points. It notes that "common-law marriage" is not part of Scots law, but it fails to note that "marriage by cohabitation with habit and repute", which is the same thing but in name, was part of Scots law until 2006.

=== United States ===
In the US, most states have abolished common-law marriage by statute. However, common-law marriage can still be contracted in Colorado, Iowa, Kansas, Montana, Oklahoma, Rhode Island, Texas, Utah, and the District of Columbia. Once they meet the requirements of common-law marriage, couples in those true common-law marriages are considered legally married for all purposes and in all circumstances.

All US jurisdictions recognize common-law marriages that were validly contracted in the originating jurisdiction, although the extent to which the US Constitution requires interstate marriage recognition has not been fully articulated by the Supreme Court. However, absent legal registration or similar notice of the marriage, the parties to a common law marriage or their eventual heirs may have difficulty proving their relationship to be marriage. Some states provide for registration of an informal or common-law marriage based on the declaration of each of the spouses on a state-issued form.

=== English-speaking Caribbean ===
Due to their colonial past, the islands of the English-speaking Caribbean have statutes concerning common-law marriage similar to those in England. However, in the Caribbean, the term "common-law" marriage is also widely described, by custom as much as by law, to be any long term relationship between male and female partners. Such unions are widespread, making up a significant percentage of families, many of which have children and may last for many years. The reasons for people choosing common-law arrangements is debated in sociological literature. Although the acceptance of this type of union varies, men being more inclined to consider them as legitimate than women, they have become an institution.

== See also ==
- Free love
- Nikah 'urfi
- Pacte civil de solidarité
- Putative marriage
