= Rennison =

Rennison is a surname. Notable people with the surname include:

- Colleen Rennison (born 1987), Canadian singer-songwriter and actress
- David Rennison, British Royal Air Force air vice marshal
- Graham Rennison (born 1978), English footballer
- Louise Rennison (1951–2016), English writer and comedian
- Richard Rennison (1889–1969), Scottish "anvil priest"
