= Ower (disambiguation) =

- Ower – Hamlet in Hampshire, England
- Charles Ower – Father and son architects
- Ower Moigne – Village and civil parish in Dorset, England

== See also ==
- Ower Bogie – Magistrate wedding
