= Fur Farming (Prohibition) Act 2000 =

Act of the Parliament of the United Kingdom

Fur Farming (Prohibition) Act 2000 (Note: Section 7(1).)
- Act of Parliament
- Parliament of the United Kingdom
- Long title: An Act to prohibit the keeping of animals solely or primarily for slaughter for the value of their fur; to provide for the making of payments in respect of the related closure of certain businesses; and for connected purposes.
- Citation: 2000 c. 33
- Territorial extent: England and Wales (Note: Section 7(4).)

Dates
- Royal assent: 23 November 2000
- Commencement: 23 November 2000 (sections 6 and 7); 23 January 2001 (section 5); 1 January 2003 (sections 1 to 4); (Note: Section 7(2) and (3). The Fur Farming (Prohibition) Act 2000 (Commencement) Order 2001 (SI 2001/3854).)
Other legislation
Amended by	Ministry of Agriculture, Fisheries and Food (Dissolution) Order 2002; Transfer of Tribunal Functions (Lands Tribunal and Miscellaneous Amendments) Order 2009; Legal Aid, Sentencing and Punishment of Offenders Act 2012 (Fines on Summary Conviction) Regulations 2015
Relates to	Fur Farming (Prohibition) (Scotland) Act 2002; Fur Farming (Prohibition) (Northern Ireland) Order 2002

Status: Amended

Text of statute as originally enacted

Revised text of statute as amended

The Fur Farming (Prohibition) Act 2000 (c. 33) is an act of the Parliament of the United Kingdom to "prohibit the keeping of animals solely or primarily for slaughter for the value of their fur" in England and Wales. It received royal assent on 23 November 2000.

== Background ==
A public consultation in 1998 found that there was "overwhelming public support to end the practice." Prior to the ban, there were 11 fur farms in the UK, producing up to 100,000 mink skins each year.

== Provisions ==
Section 1 of the act makes it an offence to keep animals solely or primarily for slaughter, whether by the keeper or another person, for the value of their fur, or for breeding progeny for such slaughter, including keeping or breeding them for sale for slaughter. It is also an offence to knowingly cause or permit another person to keep animals in that way. As enacted, the offences were punishable on summary conviction by a fine not exceeding £20,000.

Sections 2 and 3 of the act allow a court that convicts a person of an offence to make a forfeiture order for the forfeiture and destruction or other disposal of the animals concerned, including their subsequent progeny, which deprives any person of their rights in the animals. A person claiming an interest in the animals must be given the opportunity to show cause why the order should not be made, and may appeal to the Crown Court. Section 4 gives a person authorised by the appropriate authority a power to enter premises, other than a private dwelling, on which there are reasonable grounds for suspecting that an offence under section 1(1) is being committed, and to inspect them; obstructing the exercise of the power is an offence punishable by a fine not exceeding level 3 on the standard scale.

Section 5 of the act required the Minister of Agriculture, Fisheries and Food, and allowed the National Assembly for Wales, to make by order a scheme for payments in respect of income and non-income losses incurred by persons who ceased to carry on businesses consisting of activities prohibited by section 1. The scheme was to specify the losses and businesses covered and the amounts or bases of payment, and disputes over entitlement or amounts not resolved within nine months were to be referred to the Lands Tribunal. Section 6 defines the "appropriate authority" for England and Wales, and section 7 provides the short title, the commencement provisions and the extent of the act.

== Scotland and Northern Ireland ==
The act only extends to England and Wales. Fur farming was later prohibited in Scotland by the Fur Farming (Prohibition) (Scotland) Act 2002. The last fur farm in Scotland closed in 1993, but rural development minister Ross Finnie nevertheless said the Scottish act was "very necessary", adding that "It would be somewhat perverse to have one part of the UK paying compensation to ban fur farming only to allow it to relocate and start up a fresh business in another part of the UK."

Fur farming was also banned in Northern Ireland under the Fur Farming (Prohibition) (Northern Ireland) Order 2002.

All three bans were simultaneously brought into force on 1 January 2003.

== Import of fur ==
While there have been efforts to ban imports it is still (July 2026) legal to import farmed fur into the UK.

== Subsequent developments ==
The references in sections 5(1), 6(a) and 7(2) to the Minister of Agriculture, Fisheries and Food were replaced with references to the Secretary of State by the Ministry of Agriculture, Fisheries and Food (Dissolution) Order 2002 (SI 2002/794), with effect from 27 March 2002. The reference in section 5(6) to the Lands Tribunal was replaced with a reference to the Upper Tribunal by the Transfer of Tribunal Functions (Lands Tribunal and Miscellaneous Amendments) Order 2009 (SI 2009/1307), with effect from 1 June 2009. The £20,000 limit on the fine under section 1(4) was removed by the Legal Aid, Sentencing and Punishment of Offenders Act 2012 (Fines on Summary Conviction) Regulations 2015 (SI 2015/664), with effect from 12 March 2015, so that the fine is now unlimited.
