= Marriage in Scotland =

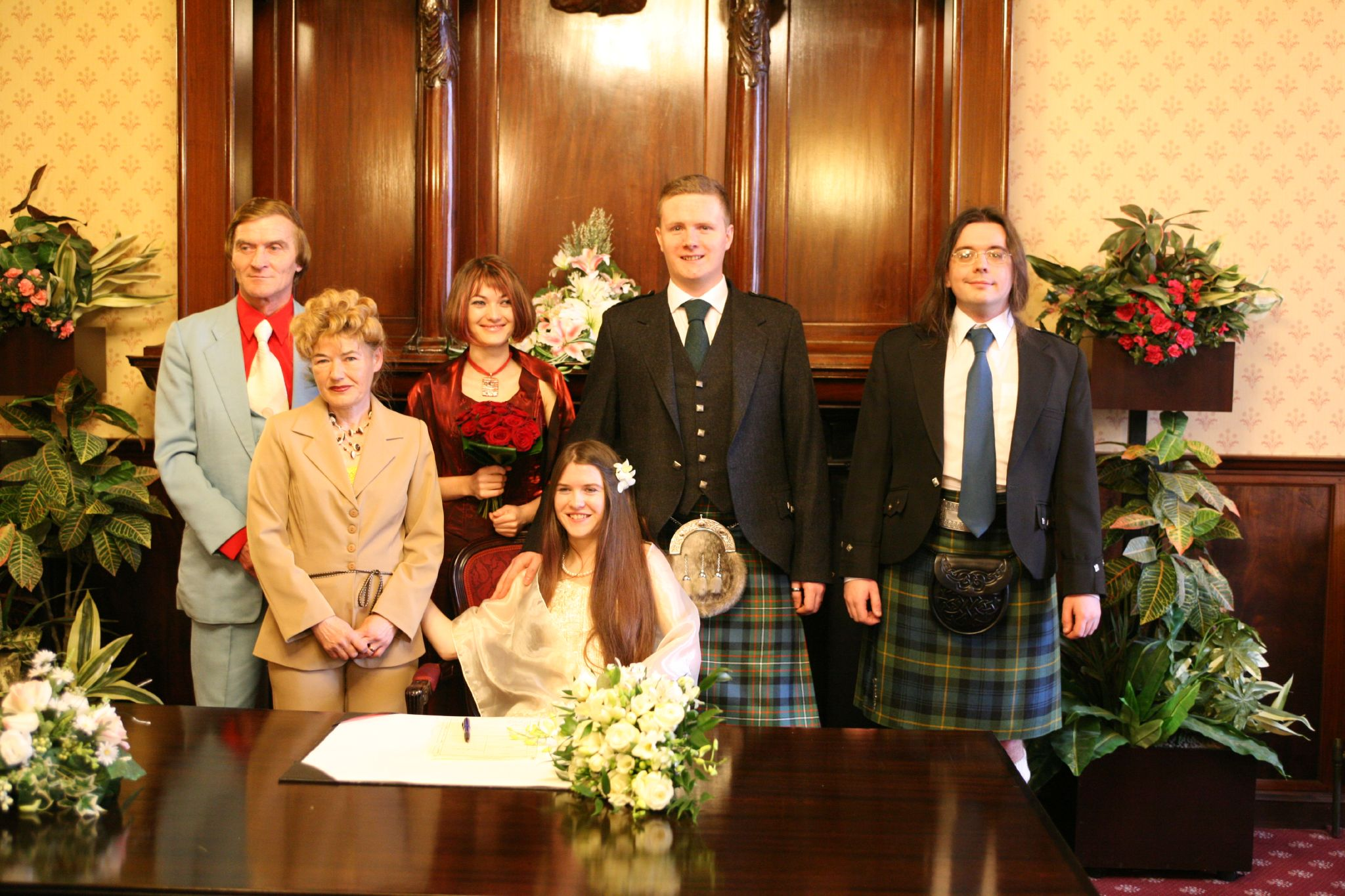
A Scottish wedding party. In this case, both groom and best man are wearing kilts.

Marriage in Scotland is recognised in the form of both civil and religious unions between individuals. Due to Scotland's history as a previously independent country, the laws around marriage developed differently in Scotland compared to other jurisdictions that also became part of the United Kingdom. This was partly a consequence of differences in Scots law and also the role and influence of the national church of Scotland, the Church of Scotland. The tradition of couples from England and Wales eloping to Scotland to marry at border towns such as Gretna Green was due to England, at the time, having much higher minimum ages for marriage without parental consent than were required in Scotland, and Scotland recognising irregular marriages by assertion before a witness until 1939 (see below). Today the difference in minimum ages is much closer with the legal minimum age to enter into a marriage in Scotland being sixteen years without requiring parental consent while England and Wales today allow marriage at eighteen.

In Scots law, there is a distinction between so-called religious marriages, conducted by an authorised celebrant, and civil marriages, conducted by a state registrar, but anyone over the age of 21 can apply to the Registrar General for authorisation to conduct a marriage under s12 of the Marriage (Scotland) Act 1977, and no form of religious ceremony is necessary. Since a decision of the Registrar-General in 2005, statutory references to religious marriages must be "read in" as referring to "religion or belief", in order to ensure compatibility with the Human Rights Act 1998 and allow humanists to conduct legal humanist marriages, which like civil marriages are also non-religious. As of 2017, the Humanist Society Scotland conducted more marriages each year than the largest religious body, the Church of Scotland.

Civil partnerships became available to same-sex couples in the United Kingdom in 2005 and grant rights and responsibilities virtually identical to civil marriage. In September 2011, the Scottish Government launched a public consultation on the introduction of same-sex marriage, with the Scottish Government indicating it "tend[ed] towards the view that same-sex marriage should be introduced". On 4 February 2014, the Scottish Parliament passed a same-sex marriage bill by a vote of 105 to 18.

== History ==
=== Middle Ages and early modern era ===
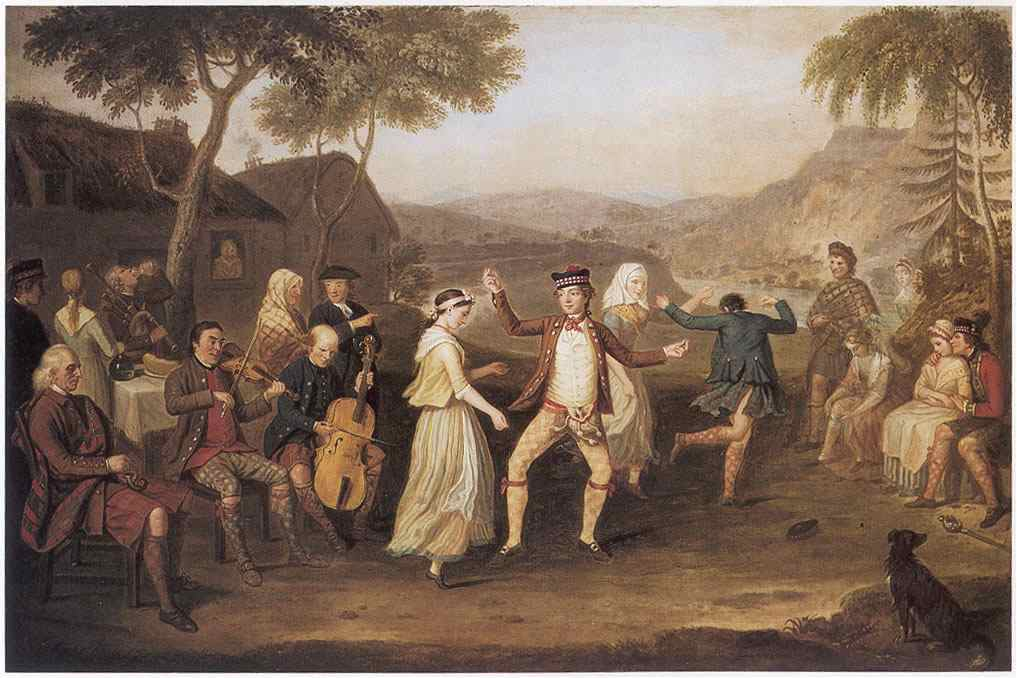
David Allan's painting of Highland wedding from 1780

In the late Middle Ages and early modern era, girls could marry from the age of 12 (while for boys it was from 14) and, while many girls from the social elite married in their teens, most in the Lowlands married only after a period of life-cycle service, in their twenties. In some cases, marriage may have followed handfasting, a period of betrothal, which in the Highlands may have effectively been a period of trial marriage, although recent scholarship suggests this idea is the result of late 20th-century New Age mythology. Marriages, particularly higher in society, were often political in nature and the subject of complex negotiations over the tocher (dowry). Some mothers took a leading role in negotiating marriages, as Lady Glenorchy did for her children in the 1560s and 1570s, or as matchmakers, finding suitable and compatible partners for others.

In the Middle Ages, marriage was a sacrament and the key element in validity was consent. The sacramental status was removed at the Reformation, but the centrality of consent remained. Weddings were often elaborate occasions for public celebration and feasting. Among the poor the tradition of the penny wedding developed, by which guests contributed to the costs of occasion, with a meal after the ceremony, sometimes followed by music and dancing.

In the early modern era there was a stress on a wife's duties to her husband and on the virtues of chastity and obedience. How exactly patriarchy worked in practice is difficult to discern. Scottish women in this period had something of a reputation among foreign observers for being forthright individuals, with Pedro de Ayala, the Spanish ambassador to the court of James IV, noting that they were "absolute mistresses of their houses and even their husbands".

Before the Reformation, the extensive marriage bars for kinship meant that most noble marriages necessitated a papal dispensation, which could later be used as grounds for annulment if the marriage proved politically or personally inconvenient, although there was no divorce as such. After the mid-sixteenth century these were reduced to those in Leviticus 13: 4-13, which limited them to relationships in the second degree of kinship. Separation from bed and board continued to be allowed in exceptional circumstances, usually adultery and under the reformed Kirk divorce was allowed on grounds of adultery or desertion. Scotland was one of the first countries to allow desertion as legal grounds for divorce and, unlike England, divorce cases were initiated relatively far down the social scale.

=== Irregular and common-law marriages ===
Marriage (Scotland) Act 1939 (Note: Section 9.)
- Act of Parliament
- Parliament of the United Kingdom
- Long title: An Act to amend the law relating to the constitution of marriage in Scotland.
- Citation: 2 & 3 Geo. 6. c. 34
- Territorial extent: United Kingdom

Dates
- Royal assent: 13 July 1939
- Commencement: 1 January 1940
- Repealed: 1 January 1978
Other legislation
Amends	Marriage Notice (Scotland) Act 1878; Registration of Births, Deaths and Marriages (Scotland) Act 1854; Marriage with Foreigners Act 1906; Age of Marriage Act 1929
Repeals/revokes	Marriage (Scotland) Act 1856; Marriage (Scotland) Act 1916
Amended by	Postponement of Enactments (Miscellaneous Provisions) Act 1939; Registration of Births, Deaths and Marriages (Scotland) Act 1965
Repealed by	Marriage (Scotland) Act 1977
Relates to	Marriage Act 1939

Status: Repealed

Text of statute as originally enacted

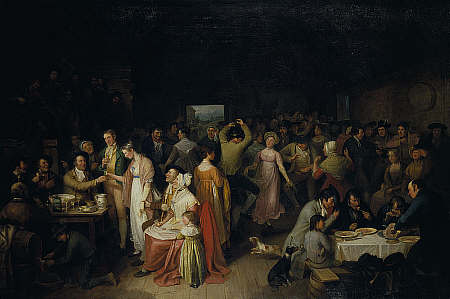
19th-century painting of a "penny wedding", one at which the guests contributed money to pay for the cost of the ceremony and to benefit the couple

Under early modern Scots law, there were three forms of "irregular marriage" which can be summarised as the agreement of the couple to be married and some form of witnessing or evidence of such. An irregular marriage could result from mutual agreement, by a public promise followed by consummation, or by cohabitation with habit and repute. All but the last of these were abolished by the Marriage (Scotland) Act 1939 (2 & 3 Geo. 6. c. 34), from 1 July 1940. Prior to this act, any citizen was able to witness a public promise. The tradition of eloping English couples searching for blacksmiths resulted legally from the fact that blacksmiths were necessarily local property-owning citizens, and could often be recognisable to strangers by their presence at their forge. Culturally, blacksmiths were long considered to have supernatural powers, which may also have influenced the tradition.

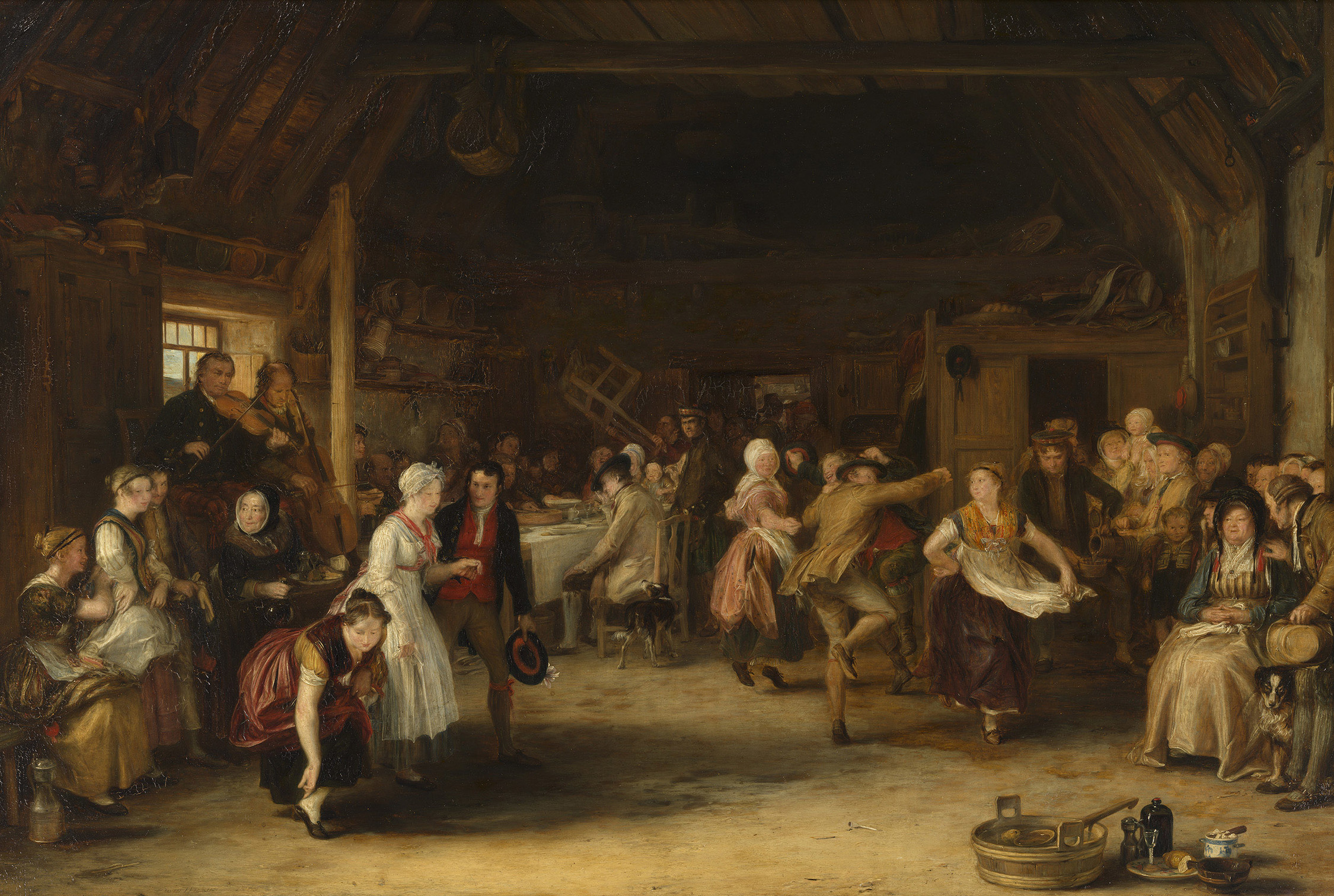
The Penny Wedding by David Wilkie, 1818

A marriage by "cohabitation with habit and repute", as it was known in Scots law, could still be formed; popularly described as "by habit and repute", with repute being the crucial element to be proved. In 2006, Scotland was the last European jurisdiction to abolish this old-style common-law marriage, by the passing of the Family Law (Scotland) Act 2006.

=== Border marriages ===
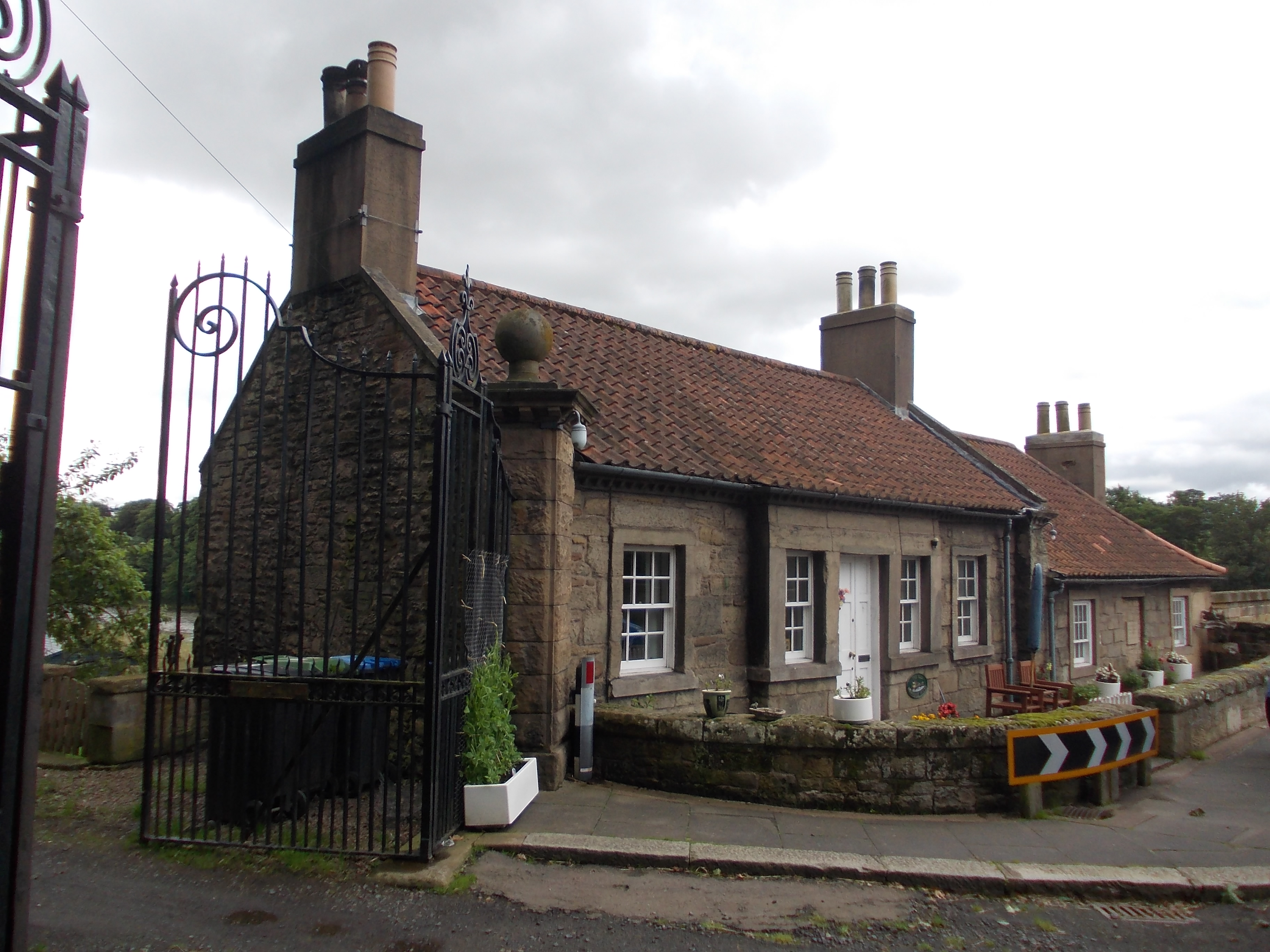
Marriage and Toll House at Coldstream Bridge, on the Scottish side; the river forms the border with England at this point

In the eighteenth and nineteenth centuries, marriage laws in Scotland encouraged the practice of couples wishing to marry eloping from England to Scotland. With transport less developed, many of these marriages were at Gretna Green, the first Scottish settlement on the main West Coast route from England; hence the term Gretna Green marriage for marriages transacted in a jurisdiction that was not the residence of the parties being married, to avoid restrictions or procedures imposed by the parties' home jurisdictions. Other Scottish Border villages used for these marriages were Coldstream Bridge, Lamberton Toll (in Lamberton, Berwickshire), Mordington and Paxton Toll. Portpatrick in Wigtownshire was used by couples from Ireland, because of the daily packet boat service to Donaghadee.

Gretna's famous runaway marriages began in 1753 with the passing of the Clandestine Marriages Act 1753 (26 Geo. 2. c. 33) in England. The act required consent to the marriage from the parents if a party to a marriage was not at least 21 years old. However, in Scotland it was possible for boys to get married at 14 years and girls at 12 years without parental consent. Some Gretna marriages were of (sometimes abducted) heiresses; e.g., the second marriage in 1826 of Edward Gibbon Wakefield to the young heiress Ellen Turner, the Shrigley abduction. Other motives for Gretna marriages were to avoid publicity or to marry immediately.

In 1856, Scottish law was changed to require 21 days' residence for marriage, and since 1929 both parties have had to be at least 16 years old (though there is still no parental consent needed). A further law change was made in 1940 to abolish these irregular marriages by declaration. The residential requirement was lifted in 1977.

Gretna Green remains a favoured location for marriage because of its romantic associations, with Dumfries and Galloway (the council area containing Gretna Green) the most popular area to get married in Scotland in 2015 (4,395 marriages in Dumfries and Galloway, out of a total of 29,691 marriages throughout Scotland).

== Eligibility ==
The marriageable age is 16. Marriage must be between two otherwise unmarried people. (Foreign divorces are generally recognised, but existing foreign polygamous marriages prevent a marriage in Scotland as this would be treated as bigamy).

Certain relatives are not allowed to marry. Under Scots law, one may not marry one's:

- ancestor or descendant
- sibling
- aunt/uncle or nephew/niece
- adoptive parent
- adopted child

Additionally, the following marriages are not allowed except under certain circumstances:

- former spouse's descendant or ancestor
- ancestor or descendant's former spouse

The list of proscribed affinities was reduced in the early twentieth century by the Deceased Wife's Sister's Marriage Act 1907, the Deceased Brother's Widow's Marriage Act 1921 and the Marriage (Prohibited Degrees of Relationship) Act 1931.

== Procedures ==
Marriage (Scotland) Act 2002 (Note: Section 2(1).)
- Act of Parliament
- Scottish Parliament
- Long title: An Act of the Scottish Parliament to amend the Marriage (Scotland) Act 1977 to enable civil marriages to be solemnised in certain places approved by local authorities; and for connected purposes.
- Citation: 2002 asp 8
- Territorial extent: Scotland

Dates
- Royal assent: 4 April 2002
- Commencement: 25 April 2002 (Note: Section 2(2). The Marriage (Scotland) Act 2002 (Commencement) Order 2002.)
Other legislation
Amends	Marriage (Scotland) Act 1977

Status: Current legislation

Text of statute as originally enacted

Text of the Marriage (Scotland) Act 2002 as in force today (including any amendments) within the United Kingdom, from legislation.gov.uk.

The Marriage (Scotland) Act 1977 (c. 15) is the main current legislation regulating marriage. The Marriage (Scotland) Act 2002 (asp 8) extends the availability of civil marriages to "approved places" in addition to Register Offices and any other place used in exceptional circumstances; religious marriages in Scotland have never been restricted by location. Marriages can either be conducted by "authorised celebrants" (usually, but not always, a minister of religion) or by an "authorised Registrar".

Both parties to a marriage are required to independently submit marriage notice forms to the registrar of the district in which the marriage is to take place. In religious marriages a "Marriage Schedule" is completed by the parties involved and submitted to the local Register Office after the marriage so that it can be registered; the Marriage Schedule must be produced to the person performing the marriage otherwise it cannot take place. After the ceremony the Schedule is signed by the couple, their witnesses and the person performing the marriage. In civil marriages, the Schedule is kept by the Registrar and signed after the ceremony. Unless specially authorised by the Registrar General, a minimum of 29 days' notice must be given for a marriage; procedural requirements increase this for most marriages to 4–6 weeks to ensure that it can be determined that there is no impediment to the marriage. A list of forthcoming local marriages is displayed to the public at each Register Office.

== Benefits and consequences ==
Upon death of one's spouse, bequests to the other spouse do not incur inheritance tax. Intestate property by default will go to the spouse. Also, there is partial inheritance of pensions. Non-British spouses of British citizens may obtain residence permits. Spouses are considered to have a duty of care towards each other, and certain social security benefits are calculated differently from those for single people.

== Foreign citizens wishing to marry in the UK ==
From 1 February 2005, visitors who wished to be married in the UK that are citizens of a country that is not a member of the European Economic Area (EEA), must apply for a visa before they travel. Without the visa, the registrar would not be able to accept the notice of marriage and would not be able to perform the marriage ceremony.

Visitors who are already in the UK, and are citizens of a country that is not a member of the EEA, would need the approval of the Home Secretary to be married. This will be provided in the form of a certificate of approval.

From 4 April 2011, the requirement for a Certificate of Approval was abolished by the United Kingdom Parliament through a Remedial Order under the Human Rights Act 1998.

== Divorce ==
Divorce is allowed under certain circumstances, as is civil remarriage, though different religions and denominations differ on whether they permit religious remarriage.

== Same-sex marriage ==
On 4 February 2014, Scotland became the 17th country to permit marriage between same-sex individuals. Since the Scottish Government had announced a consultation on legalising same-sex marriage in September 2011, the Government's initial view was stated to be in favour of legalisation of both civil and religious same-sex marriage, but allowing religious bodies to opt out of performing same-sex marriages if they so wished. As passed in 2014, the law establishing marriage equality in Scotland did not require religious institutions to hold ceremonies on their premises.

The consultation of 2011 provoked widespread debate and garnered 50,000 responses. The Equality Network gathered over 20,000 responses in favour of the change with a significant majority (18,500) submitted via the Equality Network's Equal Marriage consultation website. Scotland For Marriage, a coalition of religious bodies opposed to the change, submitted around 20,000 postcards to the Scottish Government in addition to a 9,000 signature petition.

After analysis of the responses, the Scottish Government announced it intended to go ahead with the legalisation of same-sex marriages, though with plans to put in safeguards to prevent religious bodies that do not wish to carry out such ceremonies from being prosecuted. They found that, of respondents in Scotland, 36% of those were in favour and 64% against the proposals when considering all submissions - standard responses, postcards and petitions. When standard responses alone were considered, 65% were in favour and 35% against the proposals.

The Marriage and Civil Partnerships (Scotland) Bill was put before the Scottish Parliament at the end of June 2013 and passed in February 2014.

== See also ==
- Dorothea Christina Thomas
- Scots family law
- Civil partnership
- Marriage in England and Wales
- Marriage in Northern Ireland
