= Clandestine Marriages Act 1753 =

Act of the Parliament of Great Britain

- Act of Parliament
- Parliament of Great Britain
- Long title: An Act for the Better Preventing of Clandestine Marriage.
- Citation: 26 Geo. 2. c. 33
- Territorial extent: England and Wales (Note: Section 28.)

Dates
- Royal assent: 7 June 1753
- Commencement: 25 March 1754 (Note: Section 1.)
- Repealed: 1 November 1823
Other legislation
Amended by	Confirmation of Marriages Act 1822; Clandestine Marriages Act 1823
Repealed by	Marriage Act 1823
Relates to	Marriage Act 1836

Status: Repealed

Text of statute as originally enacted

The Clandestine Marriages Act 1753 (26 Geo. 2. c. 33), also called the Marriage Act 1753, long title "An Act for the Better Preventing of Clandestine Marriage", popularly known as Lord Hardwicke's Marriage Act, was an act of the Parliament of Great Britain. The act was the first statutory legislation in England and Wales to require a formal ceremony of marriage. It came into force on 25 March 1754. The act contributed to a dispute about the validity of a Scottish marriage, although pressure to address the problem of irregular marriages had been growing for some time.

== Background ==
Before the act, the legal requirements for a valid marriage in England and Wales had been governed by the canon law of the Church of England. This had stipulated that banns should be called or a marriage licence obtained before a marriage could take place and that the marriage should be celebrated in the parish where at least one of the parties was resident. However, these requirements were directory rather than mandatory and the absence of banns or a licence – or even the fact that the marriage was not celebrated in a church – did not render the marriage void. The only indispensable requirement was that the marriage be celebrated by an Anglican clergyman. The mistaken assumption that a simple exchange of consent would suffice is based on later conflations between the theological position that consent made a marriage and the actual practice of the church courts. Prior to the passage of the Marriage Act 1753 such an exchange only created a binding contract to marry rather than a legal marriage.

As clandestine weddings and the unruly culture that surrounded them began to threaten power and property, questions about where and how to marry became urgent matters of public debate. In 1753, in an unprecedented and controversial use of state power, Lord Chancellor Hardwicke mandated Anglican church weddings as marriage's only legal form. Resistance to his Marriage Act would fuel a new kind of realist marriage plot in England and help to produce political radicalism as we know it.

— Lisa O'Connell, The Origins of the English Marriage Plot

== Effects ==
The act tightened the existing ecclesiastical rules regarding marriage, providing that for a marriage to be valid it had to be performed in a church and after the publication of banns or the obtaining of a licence. Those under the age of 21 had to have parental consent if they married by licence; marriages by banns, by contrast, were valid as long as the parent of the minor did not actually forbid the banns. Jews and Quakers were exempted from its provisions, although the act did not go so far as to declare such marriages valid and it was many years before their legal standing was assured. Nor did the Act apply to members of the British royal family. Indeed, members of the Royal Family have been consistently exempted from all general legislation relating to marriage since this date, which is why doubts were expressed in 2005 about the ability of then-Charles, Prince of Wales to marry Camilla Parker Bowles in a civil ceremony, civil marriage being the creation of statute law, specifically the Marriage Act 1836 (6 & 7 Will. 4. c. 85). It was also provided that the 1753 act had no application to marriages solemnised overseas or in Scotland.

The act was highly successful in its stated aim of putting a stop to clandestine marriages, i.e., valid marriages performed by an Anglican clergyman but not in accordance with the canons. Thus the notorious practice of clandestine fleet marriages associated with London's Fleet Prison was ended, although there were various short-lived and abortive attempts to claim exemption for the Savoy Chapel in the Strand and the parish of Temple in Cornwall. The early death of the Savoy's minister on board ship while waiting to be transported for his flouting of the act may have discouraged others from making similar claims, even if his demise was due to gout rather than to the conditions of his imprisonment.

However, some couples evaded the act by travelling to Scotland. Various Scottish "border villages" (Coldstream Bridge, Lamberton, Mordington and Paxton Toll) became known as places to marry. And in the 1770s the construction of a toll road passing through the hitherto obscure village of Graitney led to Gretna Green becoming synonymous with romantic elopements.

A similar traffic to the Isle of Man also sprang up, and in 1757, Tynwald (the legislature of the island) passed An Act to prevent Clandestine Marriages in very similar terms to the 1753 act. The Manx act differed in one significant respect from the latter, in requiring clergy from abroad, who were convicted of conducting marriages in breach of the act's requirements, to be pilloried and have their ears cropped, before being imprisoned, fined and deported. The act was repealed in 1849.

== Subsequent developments ==
The whole act was repealed by section 1 of the Marriage Act 1823 (4 Geo. 4. c. 76).

== See also ==
- Marriage Act
- Marriage Act 1836
