= List of acts of the Scottish Parliament from 2002 =

This is a list of acts of the Scottish Parliament passed in 2002. Acts of the Scottish Parliament are enacted by the Scottish Parliament, which has legislative authority over devolved matters in relation to Scotland under the authority of the Scotland Act 1998. Acts are cited by calendar year, in the same fashion as acts of Parliament of the United Kingdom. Each act passed in a respective year is numbered consecutively with Arabic numerals, following the prefix "asp".

17 acts of the Scottish Parliament were passed in 2002.

indicates that an act has been transcribed on Wikisource, indicates that an act is available to view at legislation.gov.uk, and indicates the location of the original act in the Parliamentary Archives.

== Acts of the Scottish Parliament ==
Short title	Citation	Royal assent
Long title
Scottish Local Government (Elections) Act 2002	2002 asp 1	22 January 2002
An Act of the Scottish Parliament to make provision as respects the synchronisation of the polls at local government elections with the polls at elections to the Scottish Parliament; to make some minor rectifications in enactments relating to the timing of elections; and to make provision in relation to the casting and counting of votes at, and the sending of election communications in connection with, local government elections.
School Education (Amendment) (Scotland) Act 2002	2002 asp 2	22 January 2002
An Act of the Scottish Parliament to amend the law about the provision of education for children under school age for whom placing requests have been made; and to make provision relating to the abolition of the post of assistant headteacher.
Water Industry (Scotland) Act 2002	2002 asp 3	1 March 2002
An Act of the Scottish Parliament to make further provision in relation to the Water Industry Commissioner for Scotland and to provide for the establishment of Water Customer Consultation Panels; to make further provision in relation to the regulation of the quality of drinking water; to make provision for the establishment of Scottish Water, the transfer to Scottish Water of the functions of the water and sewerage authorities established by section 62(1) of the Local Government etc. (Scotland) Act 1994 (Note: Local Government etc. (Scotland) Act 1994 (c. 39)) and the dissolution of those authorities and in relation to the functions of Scottish Water; to make further amendments of the law relating to water and sewerage; and for connected purposes.
Criminal Procedure (Amendment) (Scotland) Act 2002	2002 asp 4	8 March 2002
An Act of the Scottish Parliament to provide, retrospectively, as to the effect on trial diets in summary proceedings of arrest warrants granted at intermediate diets.
Community Care and Health (Scotland) Act 2002	2002 asp 5	12 March 2002
An Act of the Scottish Parliament to make further provision as respects social care; to make provision in relation to arrangements and payments between National Health Service bodies and local authorities as respects certain of their functions; to amend the law relating to the National Health Service; and for connected purposes.
Protection of Wild Mammals (Scotland) Act 2002	2002 asp 6	15 March 2002
An Act of the Scottish Parliament to protect wild mammals from being hunted with dogs; and for connected purposes.
Budget (Scotland) Act 2002	2002 asp 7	15 March 2002
An Act of the Scottish Parliament to make provision, for financial year 2002/03, for the use of resources by the Scottish Administration and certain bodies whose expenditure is payable out of the Scottish Consolidated Fund, for authorising the payment of sums out of the Fund, for the maximum amount of relevant expenditure for the purposes of section 94(5) of the Local Government (Scotland) Act 1973 (Note: Local Government (Scotland) Act 1973 (c. 65)) (c.65) and the maximum amounts of borrowing by certain statutory bodies; to make provision, for financial year 2003/04, for authorising the payment of sums out of the Fund on a temporary basis; and for connected purposes.
Marriage (Scotland) Act 2002	2002 asp 8	4 April 2002
An Act of the Scottish Parliament to amend the Marriage (Scotland) Act 1977 (Note: Marriage (Scotland) Act 1977 (c. 15)) to enable civil marriages to be solemnised in certain places approved by local authorities; and for connected purposes.
Sexual Offences (Procedure and Evidence) (Scotland) Act 2002	2002 asp 9	11 April 2002
An Act of the Scottish Parliament to prohibit persons charged with certain sexual offences from conducting their own defence at the trial; to provide for the appointment of solicitors to defend those persons where they do not make those appointments themselves; to prevent those persons from personally precognoscing or taking statements from alleged victims; to require those persons to give notice of defences of consent; to make new provision about the admissibility of certain evidence bearing on the character, conduct or condition of alleged victims at trials of those persons for those offences; to provide for disclosure of those persons' previous convictions of sexual offences where such evidence is allowed; and for connected purposes.
Fur Farming (Prohibition) (Scotland) Act 2002	2002 asp 10	11 April 2002
An Act of the Scottish Parliament to prohibit the keeping of animals solely or primarily for slaughter for the value of their fur; to provide for the making of payments in respect of the related closure of certain businesses; and for connected purposes.
Scottish Public Services Ombudsman Act 2002	2002 asp 11	23 April 2002
An Act of the Scottish Parliament to make provision (including provision for the purposes of section 91 of the Scotland Act 1998) (Note: Scotland Act 1998 (c. 46)) for the appointment and functions of the Scottish Public Services Ombudsman; and for connected purposes.
Education (Disability Strategies and Pupils' Educational Records) (Scotland) Act 2002	2002 asp 12	30 April 2002
An Act of the Scottish Parliament to require bodies responsible for schools to prepare and implement strategies relating to the accessibility, for pupils with a disability, of school education; and to make provision in respect of the educational records of school pupils.
Freedom of Information (Scotland) Act 2002	2002 asp 13	28 May 2002
An Act of the Scottish Parliament to make provision for the disclosure of information held by Scottish public authorities or by persons providing services for them; and for connected purposes.
Scottish Qualifications Authority Act 2002 (repealed)	2002 asp 14	6 June 2002
An Act of the Scottish Parliament to make provision in relation to the members of the Scottish Qualifications Authority; to confer power on the Scottish Ministers to regulate the procedure of that Authority; to provide for the establishment of a committee to consider and advise on matters relating to qualifications awarded by, and the functions and procedures of, that Authority; and for connected purposes. (Repealed by Education (Scotland) Act 2025 (asp 11))
University of St. Andrews (Postgraduate Medical Degrees) Act 2002	2002 asp 15	30 July 2002
An Act of the Scottish Parliament to permit the University of St. Andrews to grant postgraduate research degrees in medicine to qualified medical practitioners.
Scottish Parliamentary Standards Commissioner Act 2002	2002 asp 16	30 July 2002
An Act of the Scottish Parliament to establish a Scottish Parliamentary Standards Commissioner to investigate complaints about the conduct of members of the Parliament and to report upon the outcome of such investigations to the Parliament; and for connected purposes.
Debt Arrangement and Attachment (Scotland) Act 2002	2002 asp 17	17 December 2002
An Act of the Scottish Parliament to provide a scheme under which individuals may arrange for their debts to be paid under payment programmes; to create a new diligence in relation to corporeal moveable property owned by a debtor; to make special provision for the use of that diligence in relation to property kept in dwellinghouses; to abolish poindings and warrant sales; and for connected purposes.

== See also ==
- List of acts of the Scottish Parliament
