= Shrigley abduction =

1826 abduction of Ellen Turner by Edward Gibbon Wakefield

The Shrigley abduction was an 1826 British case of a forced marriage by Edward Gibbon Wakefield to the 15-year-old heiress Ellen Turner of Pott Shrigley. The couple were married in Gretna Green, Scotland, and had travelled to Calais, France, by the time authorities were notified by Turner's father and intervened. The marriage was annulled by Parliament, and Turner was legally married two years later, at the age of 17, to a wealthy neighbour of her class. Edward Gibbon Wakefield and his brother William, who had aided him, were each convicted at trial and sentenced to three years in prison.

Wakefield's abduction of Ellen Turner in The Chronicles of Newgate

== Background ==
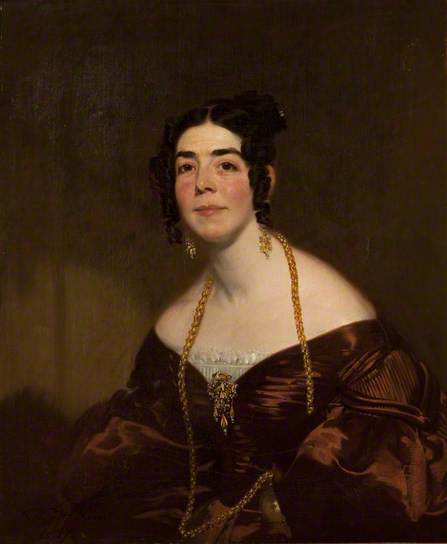
Ellen Turner by Henry Wyatt

Ellen Turner was the daughter and only child of William Turner, a wealthy resident of Pott Shrigley, Cheshire, who owned calico printing and spinning mills. At the time of the abduction, Turner was a High Sheriff of Cheshire and lived in Shrigley Hall, near Macclesfield.

Edward Gibbon Wakefield was 30 years old; the eldest son of Edward Wakefield, he had been a King's Messenger (a diplomatic courier) as a teenager, and later became a diplomat. At the age of 20, he had eloped to Scotland with a 17-year-old heiress, Eliza Pattle. Her mother accepted the marriage and an immediate income of £600 a year on the young couple, to which was to be added £30000 on Eliza's twenty-first birthday. Eliza died four years later in 1820 after giving birth to her third child, at the age of twenty. Wakefield had political ambitions and wanted more money. He conspired with his brother William Wakefield and his stepmother, Frances, to marry Ellen Turner for her inheritance.

Wakefield appeared to have based his plan to marry Ellen Turner on the expectation that her parents would respond as Mrs Pattle had.

== False summons ==
On 7 March 1826, Wakefield sent his servant Edward Thevenot with a carriage to Liverpool, where Ellen was a pupil at a boarding school. Thevenot presented a message to the Misses Daulby, the mistresses of the school. (The Misses Daulby were the daughters of Daniel Daulby, a well-known Liverpool collector and author of The Collected Works of Rembrandt (1796)). The message stated that Mrs Turner had become paralysed and wished to see her daughter immediately. The Misses Daulby were initially suspicious of the fact that Ellen did not recognise Thevenot but eventually let him take her away.

Thevenot took Ellen Turner to Manchester and the Hotel Albion to meet Wakefield. Wakefield told her that her father's business had collapsed, and that Wakefield had agreed to take her to Carlisle, where Turner had supposedly fled to escape his creditors.

The party proceeded to Kendal, where the next day Wakefield told Ellen that her father was a fugitive. He claimed that two banks had agreed that some of her father's estate would be transferred to her or, to be exact, her husband. He said that his banker uncle had proposed that Wakefield marry Ellen, and that if she would agree to marry him, her father would be saved. Ellen allowed them to take her to Carlisle. There, Edward's brother William Wakefield, who had traveled with them, claimed to have spoken to Turner and got his agreement to the marriage.

Ellen finally consented and the Wakefields took her over the border of Scotland to Gretna Green, a favoured place of elopement for those who wanted to exploit the less strict marriage laws of Scotland. There Ellen and Edward were married by blacksmith David Laing.

They returned to Carlisle, where Ellen said she wanted to see her father. Wakefield agreed to take her to Shrigley, but instead took her to Leeds. Wakefield then claimed he had a meeting in Paris that he could not postpone, and had to go to France by way of London. He sent his brother off, ostensibly to invite Turner to meet them in London. Wakefield and Ellen continued to London. In London, Wakefield, accompanied by Ellen, pretended to inquire after his brother and Turner. At Blake's Hotel, a valet told them that Turner and Wakefield had gone to France. Edward Wakefield and Ellen had to follow them, and he took her to Calais.

== Suspicions arise ==
After a few days, Miss Daulby became concerned. Turner and his wife received a letter from Wakefield, stating that he had married Ellen. Wakefield may have expected the Turners to accept the marriage rather than face a public scandal. Instead, Turner went to London and asked for help from the Foreign Secretary. Learning that his daughter had been taken to the European mainland, Turner sent his brother to Calais, accompanied by a police officer and a solicitor. There they soon found the couple staying in a hotel.

Wakefield claimed that since they were legally married, Ellen could not be taken from him by force. After interviewing the girl, the French authorities let her leave the country with her uncle. Wakefield wrote a statement attesting that Ellen was still a virgin, and he left for Paris.

== Arrest and trial ==
The British Foreign Secretary had issued a warrant for the Wakefields' arrest; William was arrested in Dover a couple of days later. He was taken to Cheshire, where magistrates debated his offence. They committed him to Lancaster Castle to await trial. The Court of King's Bench later released him on £2,000 bail and two sureties of £1,000 each.

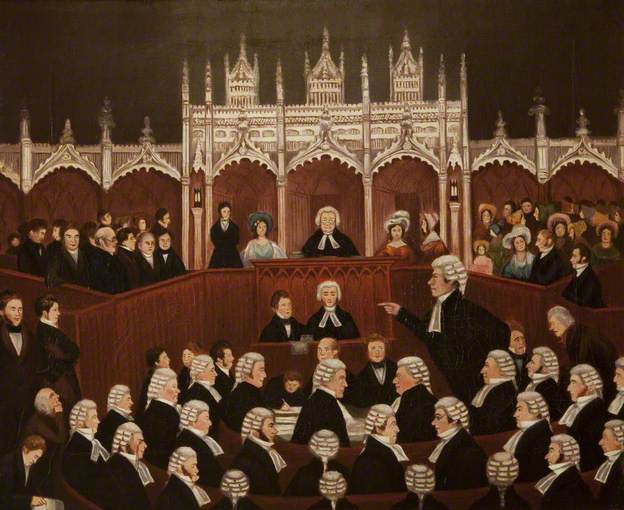
Trial of Edward Gibbon Wakefield, 1826 by Dawson Watson

Edward Thevenot and the Wakefields' stepmother Frances were indicted as accomplices. Both brothers and their stepmother appeared in court and pleaded "not guilty". Thevenot, who was still in France, was indicted for felony in absentia. On 23 March 1827 all three defendants were put on trial in Lancaster. The jury found all guilty the same day. They were committed to Lancaster Castle the following day.

On 14 May the Wakefields were taken to the Court of King's Bench in Westminster Hall in London. William testified that he had acted as guided by his brother. Edward Wakefield swore that the legal expenses had exceeded £3,000. The court sentenced the brothers to three years in prison, Edward in Newgate and William in Lancaster Castle. Frances Wakefield was released. The marriage was later annulled by Act of Parliament on 14 June 1827.

== Aftermath ==
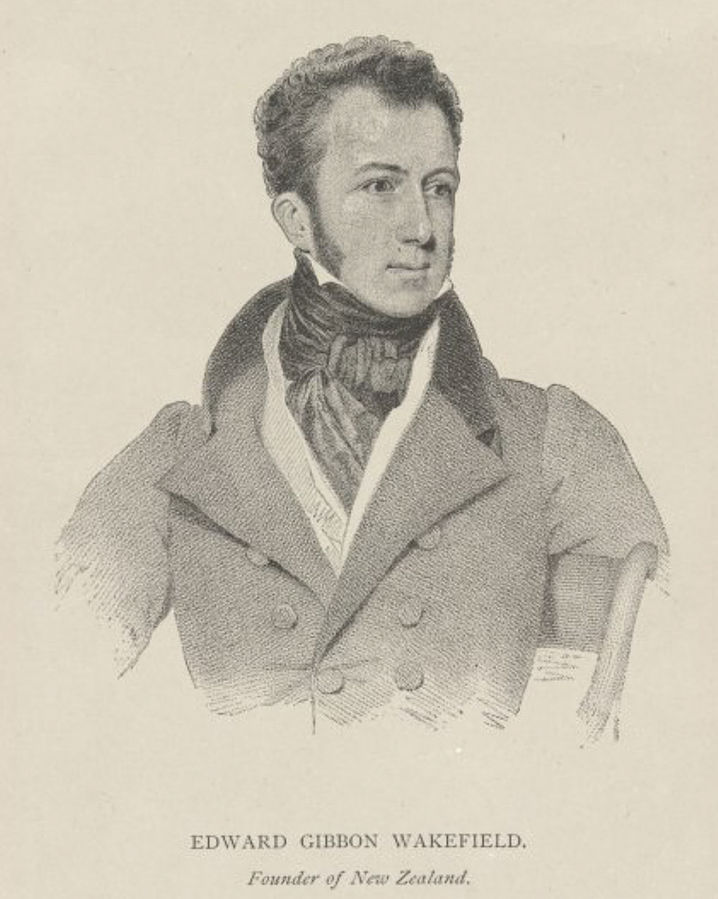
Edward Gibbon Wakefield by Benjamin Holl

After his release, Edward Wakefield became active in prison reform. He became involved in colonial affairs, and had roles in the development of South Australia, Canada, and New Zealand. William Wakefield became an early leader in the colonisation of New Zealand.

William Turner was elected Member of Parliament for Blackburn as a Whig in 1832, serving until 1841. At the age of 17, Ellen Turner married Thomas Legh, a wealthy neighbour. She died in childbirth at the age of 19 and was survived by a daughter.
