= Richard Rennison =

Scottish anvil priest (1889–1969)

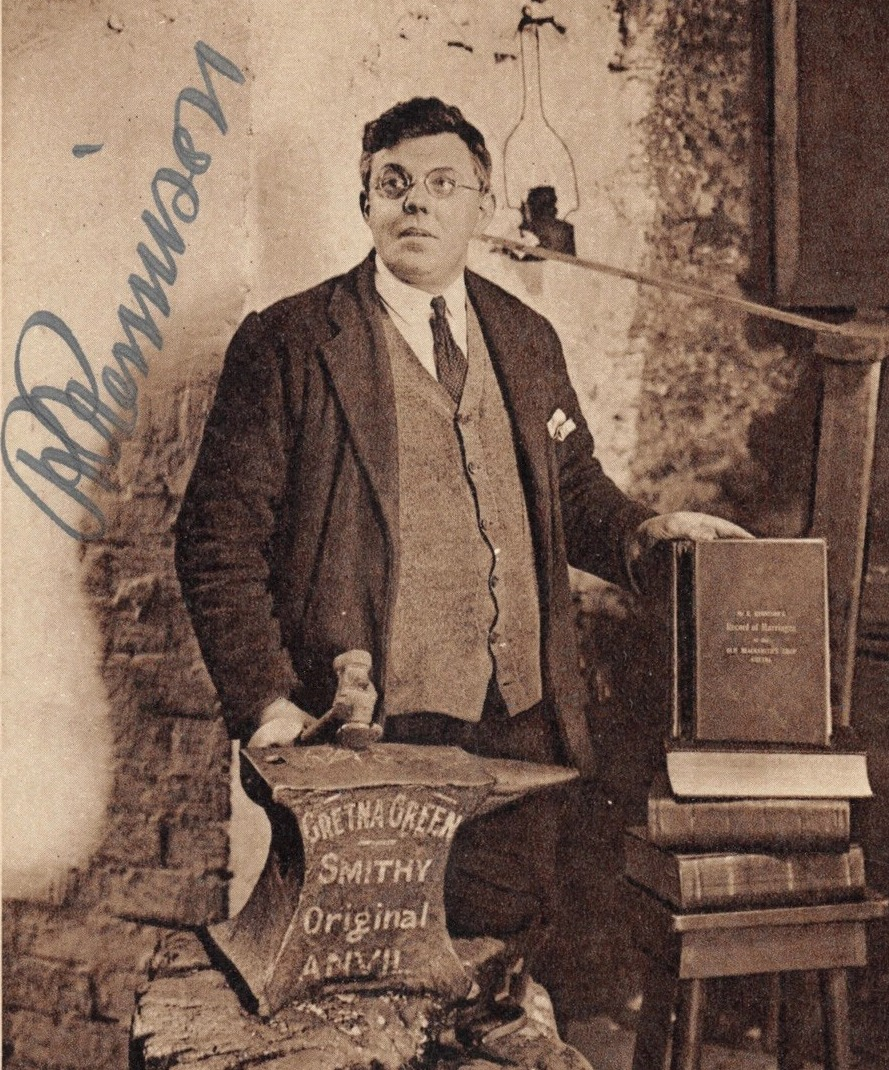
- Image of Richard Rennison in 1933, standing above the marriage anvil.
- Born: 29 October 1889; Shankhouse, Northumberland, England
- Died: 5 August 1969 (aged 79); Haltwhistle, Northumberland, England
- Known for: Last "anvil priest"

Richard Rennison (29 October 1889 – 5 August 1969) was a British blacksmith who was the last "anvil priest" at Gretna Green, Scotland. Between 1926 and 1940, Rennison performed "irregular marriages" of couples over the anvil at the Old Blacksmith Shop, where the couple proclaimed that they were single and wanted to get married in front of witnesses. Rennison generally requested a fee of £1, but was known to earn up to £20 for a ceremony (approximately £3,030 in 2012).

The popularity of the marriages grew whilst Rennison was performing them, to the point that a special committee was formed to look at marriage in Scotland, to which he was called as a witness. By the time "irregular marriages" were outlawed in Scotland by the Marriage (Scotland) Act 1939, Rennison had conducted 5,147 ceremonies.

== Personal life ==
Richard Rennison was born on 29 October 1889 in Shankhouse in Northumberland, England to James Rennison, a coal miner, and his wife Ann. He spent time working as a "General Dealer" and as a photographer. He also spent time as a Methodist preacher in Tyneside. In 1923, Rennison married Jessie Little in Nicholforest, Cumberland. In 1926, the pair moved to Gretna Green just across the border in Scotland, by which time Rennison was describing himself as a saddler, an ironmonger and a boot maker. When he moved to Gretna, Rennisonnitially set himself up as a saddler and opened a cafe, before being taken on by Hugh Mackie, the manager of the Old Blacksmith's Shop.

Rennison died on 5 August 1969 at Haltwhistle, Northumberland.

== The last "anvil priest" ==
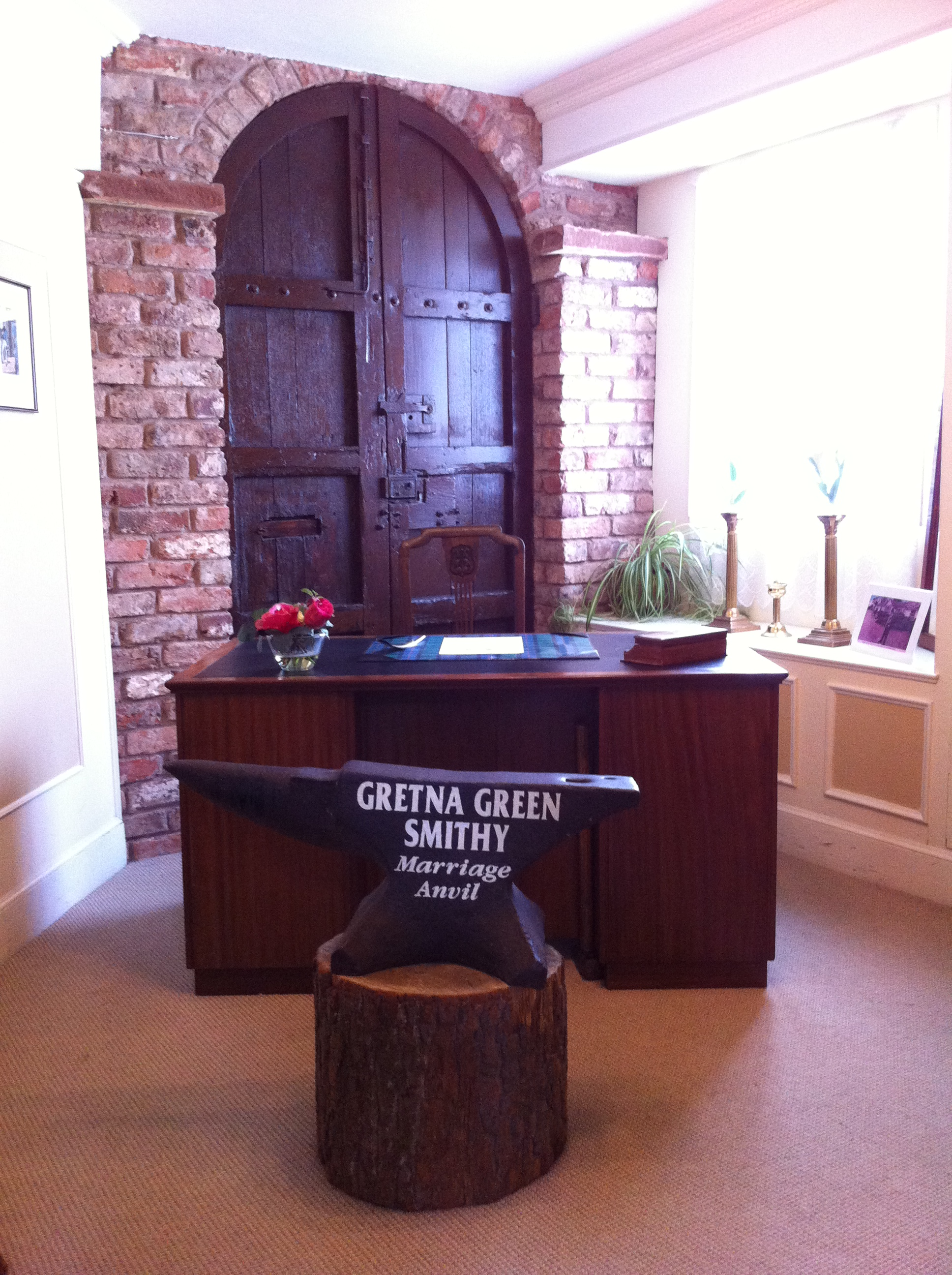
Richard Rennison's office, where couples still get married in private ceremonies

Before 1940, marriage in Scotland was based on Celtic customs, rather than the Catholic religious-based customs in England. As such, Scottish marriage law only required a couple to agree to be married in front of witnesses, did not require parental consent, laymen could serve as officiant, and a lower marriageable age. The simplicity of these "irregular marriages" meant that they were used by English couples who wished to elope while avoiding the stricter marriage laws in England. Gretna Green became a hotspot for elopement because it was the village in Scotland nearest to the English border and located on a main road. Many marriages were provided by the local blacksmith as he was certain to be a citizen of Scotland and was easy to find at the forge.

Hugh Mackie purchased the Old Blacksmith's Shop at Gretna Green in 1890 and resided there as "anvil priest" until 1926 when he was looking to retire and find a replacement. Mackie found Richard Rennison, who had recently joined the community, and by October 1927, Rennison was presiding over marriages and acting as caretaker of the shop. The shop had ceased any metalwork in 1900 and was solely used for marriage ceremonies. A natural showman, Rennison soon became the resident "anvil priest" in Gretna Green and set about marrying people. He would regularly point out that, although he was not a member of the clergy, he could marry people as he was "No Sinner" – the reverse of his surname! In his first ten years, he married around 2,000 couples, the majority of whom were couples between 40 and 60 years old. By 1939, the number of marriages he had performed had increased past 4,000 due to the many young men who wanted to get married before starting their service in World War II.

Marriages performed by Rennison
Year	Number of marriages
1926 to 1928	365
1929	304
1930	331
1931	244
1932	215
1933	210
1934	321
1935	305

Marriages at the blacksmith shop were inconsistent during Rennison's time as "anvil priest". Although they followed the same pattern, and both parties were to declare in front of witnesses they were single and that one had lived in Scotland for 21 days, there are documented cases where these requirements were not confirmed. At this point, Rennison would strike the hammer on the anvil, and the couple would be legally married. Rennison's wife often acted as a witness to the couples getting married, and sometimes performed the ceremonies herself. The marriage fee was supposedly £1, but Rennison would sometimes perform the ceremony for free or however much he was given; in one case he received £20 (worth approximately £3,030 in 2012). (Note: Comparing average earnings between 1930 and 2012, £1 is valued at approximately £152 by MeasuringWorth.com and £20 is valued at approximately £3,030.) If witnesses were required, they would be provided at the cost of 2s 6d each. (Note: Comparing average earnings between 1930 and 2012, 2s 6d is valued at approximately £19.70 by MeasuringWorth.com.)

Rennison travelled to London in 1931 for a "sight-seeing visit", and he brought the anvil with him to protect it from theft. The anvil never left his side, despite weighing 240 pounds (110 kg). The Leader-Post suggested that, since the cost of a new anvil was much less than the cost of transporting the old one, this was more likely to be a publicity stunt.

In 1935, due to the increasing popularity of the Gretna Green "irregular marriages", a special committee headed by Lord Morison was appointed to look at marriage in Scotland. Rennison gave evidence before the committee in 1936. There he claimed that he was known as "the Gretna priest", but did not dress like one and stated that he knew he was not one. He also confirmed that he had been removing the word "priest" from marriage certificates and telling couples that they needed to confirm their marriage with the registrar at Dumfries. The committee's findings led to the Marriage (Scotland) Act 1939, which outlawed the process of "irregular marriages". When the new law came into force in 1940, Rennison had performed 5,147 marriages. His role then changed to a symbolic one, "blessing" marriages and acting as caretaker of the forge. He also regularly appeared at court to ensure the marriages he performed were judicially recognised.
