= Fur Farming (Prohibition) (Scotland) Act 2002 =

Fur Farming (Prohibition) (Scotland) Act
- Act of the Scottish Parliament
- Scottish Parliament
- Long title: An Act of the Scottish Parliament to prohibit the keeping of animals solely or primarily for slaughter for the value of their fur; to provide for the making of payments in respect of the related closure of certain businesses; and for connected purposes
- Citation: 2002 asp 10
- Territorial extent: Scotland

Dates
- Royal assent: 11 April 2002

Other legislation
- Relates to: Fur Farming (Prohibition) Act 2000

Status: Amended

Text of the Fur Farming (Prohibition) (Scotland) Act 2002 as in force today (including any amendments) within the United Kingdom, from legislation.gov.uk.

The Fur Farming (Prohibition) (Scotland) Act 2002 (asp 10) is an act of the Scottish Parliament "to prohibit the keeping of animals solely or primarily for slaughter for the value of their fur". It received royal assent on 11 April 2002.

The last fur farm in Scotland closed in 1993, but the Scottish Executive nevertheless described the act as necessary due to the Fur Farming (Prohibition) Act 2000, which prohibited fur farming in England and Wales.

Despite the ban, fur farming continues in the UK, according to the Humane Society.
