= Ower Bogie =

Magistrate wedding in Scotland

Ower Bogie (i.e. over the River Bogie, near Huntly) was an expression used in Scotland for a wedding conducted by a magistrate, not a clergyman. In Aberdeenshire it was synonymous with a Gretna Green wedding in Dumfriesshire.

The Bogie was near the boundary of Aberdeenshire and Banffshire.

I will awa’ wi’ my love

I will awa’ wi’ her,

Though a’ my kin had sorrow and said,

I’ll ower Bogie wi’ her

(Allan Ramsay, Tea Table Miscellany)

Its origin is unknown, though it is supposed that some accommodating magistrate, at some time or other, resided on the opposite side of the River Bogie from that of the town or village inhabited by the lovers who desired to be joined in the bonds of matrimony without subjecting themselves to the sometimes inconvenient interrogations of the Kirk. John Jamieson erroneously quotes the phrase as "ower boggie".
