= Gretna Green =

Parish in Dumfries and Galloway, Scotland

Coordinates: 55.002°N 3.066°W

Gretna Green: Scottish Gaelic: Cluain Ghreatna; Scots: Gretna Green
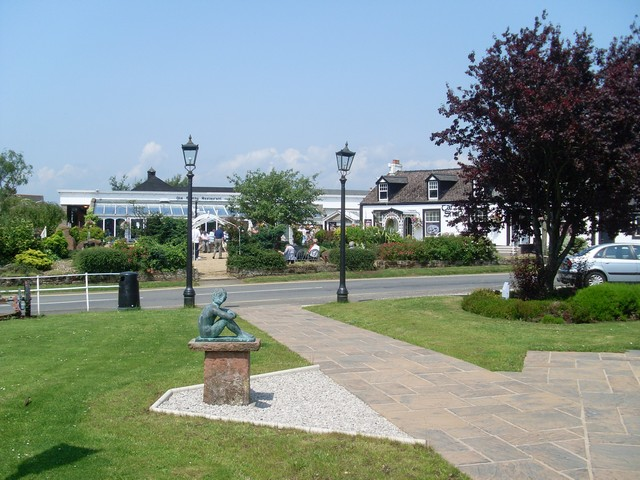
- Public square and fountains in Gretna Green

- Location within Dumfries and Galloway
- Population: 3,437 (2022 census)
- OS grid reference: NY318680
- Council area: Dumfries and Galloway
- Lieutenancy area: Dumfries
- Country: Scotland
- Sovereign state: United Kingdom
- Post town: GRETNA
- Postcode district: DG16
- Dialling code: 01461
- Police: Scotland
- Fire: Scottish
- Ambulance: Scottish
- UK Parliament: Dumfriesshire, Clydesdale and Tweeddale
- Scottish Parliament: Dumfriesshire

Gretna Green is a parish in the southern council area of Dumfries and Galloway, Scotland, close to the town of Gretna, on the Scottish side of the English-Scottish border. It is accessed from the A74(M) motorway. Historically Gretna Green was on the Glasgow-Carlisle road, a significant early toll road between England and Scotland.

Gretna Green railway station serves both Gretna Green and Gretna. The Quintinshill rail disaster, the worst rail crash in British history, in which over 220 died, occurred near Gretna Green in 1915. "Gretna Green" has become synonymous for its "runaway marriages", given the age of consent for marriage in Scotland under Scots law is 16, whilst in England and Wales the legal age is 18.

== Etymology ==
Gretna means "(place at the) gravelly hill", from Old English greot "grit" (in the dative form greoten (which is where the -n comes from) and hoh "hill-spur".

== History ==
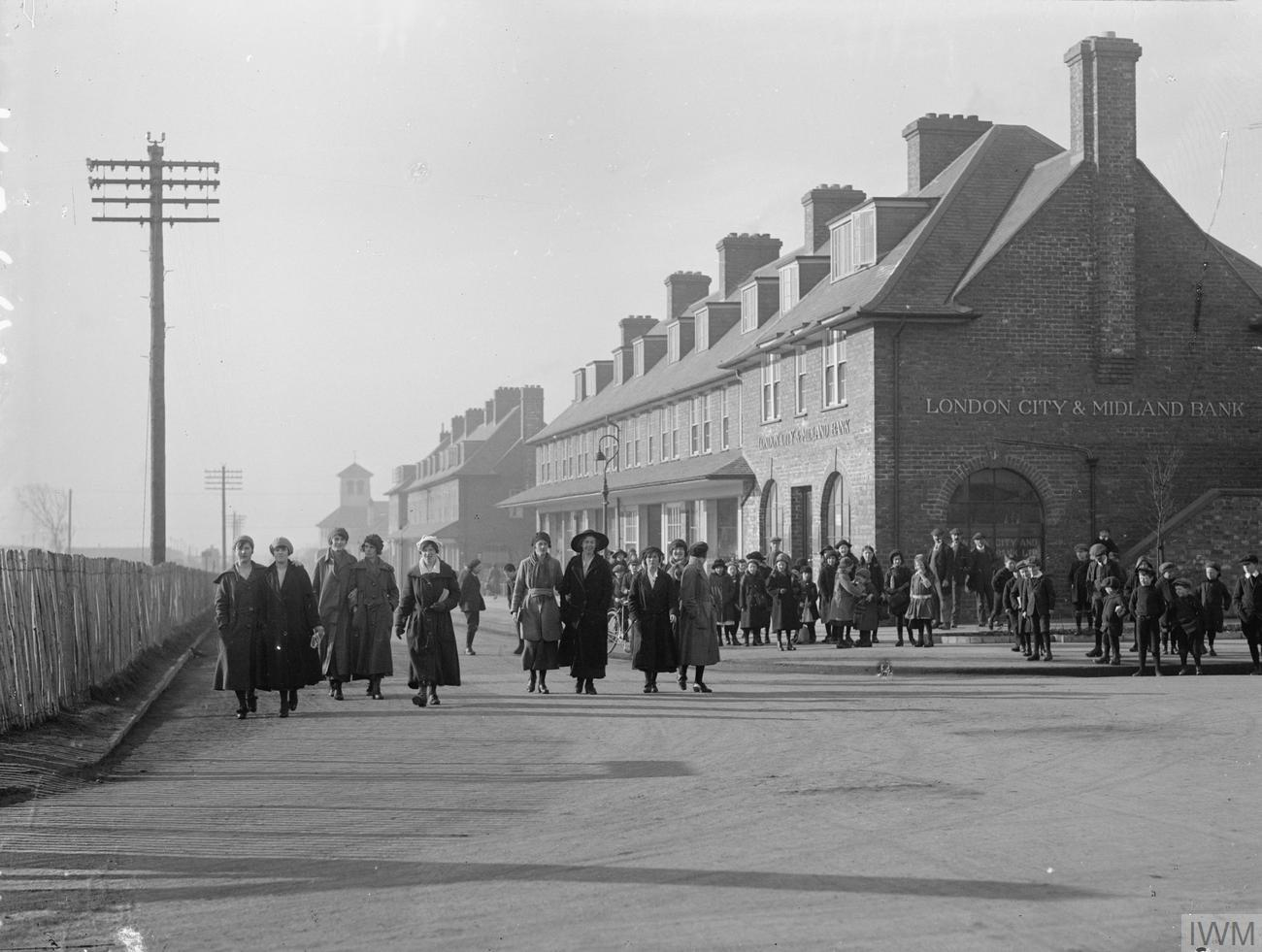
Central Avenue in the 1910s

The Lochmaben Stone is a megalith standing in a field, nearly 1 mile (1.6 km) west of the Sark mouth on the Solway Firth, three hundred yards or so above high water mark on the farm of Old Graitney. It was one of the traditionally recognised meeting places on the Anglo-Scottish border.

=== 17th century ===
Prior to the Acts of Union 1707 of the Parliaments of England and Scotland, Gretna was a customs post for collecting taxes on cattle crossing the border between the two kingdoms. The Gretna customs post was established in 1612. A drove road was constructed between Gretna and Annan in 1619, possibly to facilitate the transportation of cattle from Wigtownshire, Kirkcudbrightshire and Dumfriesshire to markets in England.

=== 18th century ===
Gretna's principal claim to fame arose in 1753 when an Act of Parliament, Lord Hardwicke's Marriage Act, was passed in England, which provided that consent to the marriage had to be given by the parents if both parties were not at least 21 years old. This Act did not apply in Scotland, which allowed boys to marry at 14 and girls at 12, with or without parental consent. The Act also required procedures that gave notice of an impending marriage to the community. As a result, many elopers fled England, and the first Scottish village they reached was often Gretna. The act was repealed in 1849.

=== 19th century ===
The population of the parish at the time of the 1841 census was 1,308 inhabitants.

== Marriage ==
Gretna's "runaway marriages" began in 1754 when Lord Hardwicke's Marriage Act came into force in England. Under the Act, if a parent of a person under the age of 21 objected to the minor's marriage, the parent could legally veto the union. The Act tightened the requirements for marrying in England and Wales but did not apply in Scotland, where it was possible for boys to marry at 14 and girls at 12 with or without parental consent (see Marriage in Scotland). It was, however, only in the 1770s, with the construction of a toll road passing through the hitherto obscure village of Graitney, that Gretna Green became the first easily reachable village over the Scottish border.

Scots law also allowed for "irregular marriages", meaning that if a declaration was made before two witnesses, almost anybody had the authority to conduct the marriage ceremony. The blacksmiths in Gretna became known as "anvil priests", culminating with Richard Rennison (1889-1969), who performed 5,147 ceremonies. The local blacksmith and his anvil became lasting symbols of Gretna Green weddings.

Since 1929, both parties in Scotland have had to be at least 16 years old, but they still may marry without parental consent. Since April 2022 in England and Wales, the minimum age for marriage has been 18 irrespective of parental consent. Of the three forms of irregular marriage that had existed under Scottish law, all except cohabitation by habit and repute were abolished by the Marriage (Scotland) Act 1939.

Gretna's two blacksmiths' shops and countless inns and smallholding became the backdrops for tens of thousands of weddings. Today there are several wedding venues in and around Gretna Green, from former churches to purpose-built chapels. The services at all the venues are always performed over an iconic blacksmith's anvil.

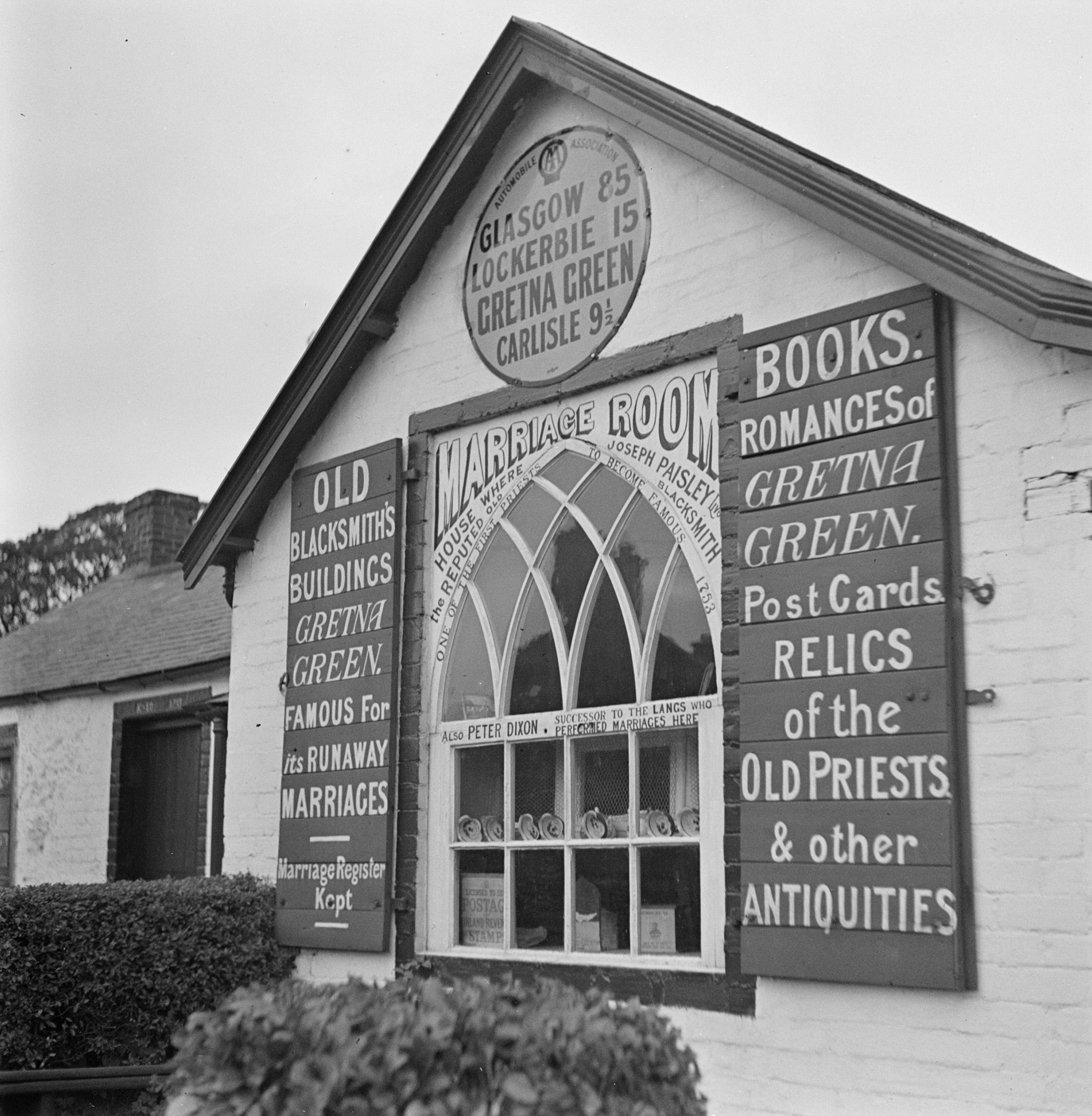
1930s photo of the village blacksmiths, "famous for its runaway marriages"

=== Elsewhere ===
In common law, a "Gretna Green marriage" came to mean, in general, a marriage transacted in a jurisdiction that was not the residence of the parties being married, to avoid restrictions or procedures imposed by the parties' home jurisdiction. A notable "Gretna" marriage was the second marriage in 1826 of Edward Gibbon Wakefield to the young heiress Ellen Turner, called the Shrigley abduction (his first marriage was also to an heiress, but the parents wanted to avoid a public scandal). Other towns in which quick, often surreptitious marriages could be obtained came to be known as "Gretna Greens". In the United States, these have included Elkton, Maryland, Reno and, later, Las Vegas.

In 1856 Scottish law was changed due to a measure passed in Parliament by Alexander Colquhoun-Stirling-Murray-Dunlop to require 21 days' residence for marriage, and a further law change was made in 1940. The residential requirement was lifted in 1977. Other Scottish border villages used for such marriages were Coldstream Bridge, Lamberton, Mordington and Paxton Toll, and Portpatrick for people coming from Ireland.

== In popular culture ==
- In Pride and Prejudice by Jane Austen, when the heroine's youngest sister Lydia Bennet elopes with George Wickham she leaves behind a note stating that their intended destination is Gretna Green, though later they are found cohabitating in London, having not yet married at all. Gretna Green had earlier appeared in Austen's satirical childhood novella Love and Freindship [sic], in which protagonists Laura and Sophia convince Sophia's impressionable fifteen-year-old cousin Janetta to break an engagement to a 'sensible, well-informed, and agreeable' man and elope to Gretna Green with the disreputable Captain M'Kenrie.
- In the Leo Sayer song "Moonlighting" a young couple elopes, driving through the night and exulting in the final line, "we're only ten miles to Gretna, they're three hundred behind."
- In the 1956 British movie Now and Forever the two main young characters, Janette and Mike, elope to Gretna Green.
- In Season 3, Episode 5 of the BBC series You Rang, M'Lord?, two of the characters elope to Gretna Green. This then prompts two other characters to elope in a similar manner. However, they are stopped before they reach Scotland.
- In Season 6, Episode 20 of the BBC series Waterloo Road, student Jonah Kirby elopes with teacher and Head of Spanish, Francesca 'Cesca' Montoya, to Gretna Green in order to get married.
- In Season 2, Episode 7 of the ITV series Downton Abbey, Lady Sybil Crawley tries to elope to Gretna Green with chauffeur Tom Branson.
- In Season 6, Episode 8 of the ITV series Downton Abbey, Lady Mary Crawley reconciles with Henry Talbot and suggests that they elope to Gretna Green.
- In Episode 3 of the ITV series Doctor Thorne, adapted from the Anthony Trollope novel of the same name, the character Frank makes a joke about him and Mary running off to marry in Gretna Green.
- In Season 5, Episode 6 of the BBC series Poldark, Geoffrey Charles and Cecily Hanson try to flee to Gretna Green.
- In Season 1 of the Netflix series Bridgerton, Colin Bridgerton and Marina Thompson plan to run away to Gretna Green for a quick wedding, though the scheme ultimately falls through.
- In Half A Sixpence the two main characters (Arthur Kipps and Ann) marry at Gretna Green.
- In the 1967 French film Les Grandes Vacances with Louis de Funes, the young couple elopes to Gretna Green to marry without their parents' consent.
- Gretna Green is revealed to be the hometown of the character James Spooner in Season 6 Episode 1 of the podcast My Dad Wrote a Porno.
- The English punk rock band Martha has a song called "Gretna Green," about a person killed in the Quintinshill rail disaster who was traveling to marry their partner in Gretna Green.
- The English author Linzi Day has a series of fantasy books set in Gretna Green. About a midlife woman who inherits the Recordership with responsibility forseven realms.

== See also ==
- Ower Bogie, an expression used in Scotland to describe a wedding conducted by a magistrate
- Peak Forest, a village in England known as the 'Gretna Green of Derbyshire' because marriages could be performed without banns
- Las Vegas weddings, where marriage licenses are easy and quick to obtain
- Gretna Green railway station, the local railway station reopened in 1993
