= Coldstream Bridge =

Bridge in the Scottish Borders, Scotland

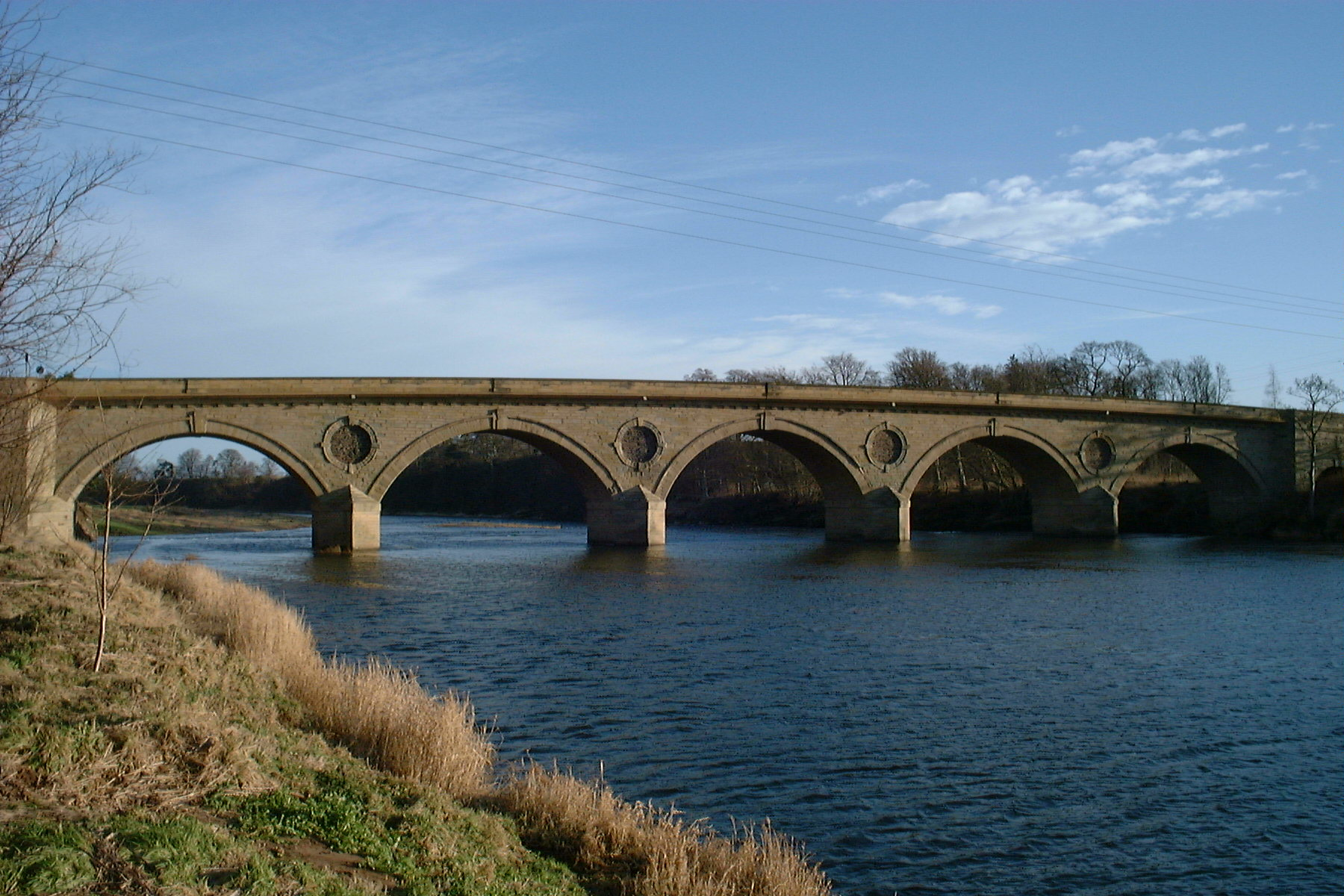
- The bridge over the River Tweed at Coldstream
- Coordinates: 55.654°N 2.242°W
- Carries: A698
- Crosses: River Tweed
- Locale: Northumberland, England; Scottish Borders, Scotland

Characteristics
- Material: Sandstone blocks

History
- Designer: John Smeaton; Robert Reid
- Construction start: 1763
- Construction end: 1766
- Construction cost: £6,000

Listed Building – Category A
- Official name: Coldstream Bridge (that Part In Scotland) Over The Tweed
- Designated: 8 June 1971
- Reference no.: LB4075

Listed Building – Grade II
- Official name: Coldstream Bridge (That Part in England)
- Designated: 6 May 1952
- Reference no.: 1153712

Location
- Interactive map of Coldstream Bridge

Coldstream Bridge, linking Coldstream, Scottish Borders with Cornhill-on-Tweed, Northumberland, is an 18th-century Category A/Grade II* listed bridge between England and Scotland, across the River Tweed. The bridge carries the A697 road across the Tweed.

The bridge is one of three bridges spanning the River Tweed section of the Anglo-Scottish border (the others being the Union Chain Bridge and the Ladykirk and Norham Bridge), and the oldest of the three.

== History ==
The architect for the bridge was John Smeaton (responsible for the third Eddystone Lighthouse), working for the Tweed Bridges Trust. Construction lasted from July 1763 to 28 October 1766, when it opened to traffic.

The cost of the bridge was £6,000, with government grants available for the project and the shortfall covered by a mixture of local subscription and loans from Edinburgh's banks, which were to be paid back by the tolling system. There was controversy when the project's resident engineer, Robert Reid of Haddington, used some of the funds to build accommodation for himself, but the trustees were assuaged when Smeaton argued that the house would actually help support the bridge. It seems that Smeaton was sympathetic to Reid, believing him to be underpaid for his work.

The bridge underwent subsequent work, including the 1784 construction of a downstream weir as an anti-erosion measure, concrete reinforcement of the foundations in 1922, alterations in 1928, and major work in 1960–1961 to strengthen the bridge and widen the road.

A plaque on the bridge commemorates the 1787 visit of the poet Robert Burns to the Coldstream. Of historical note is the toll house on the Scottish side of the bridge, which became infamous for the runaway marriages that took place there, as at Gretna Green, hence its name, the 'Wedding House' or 'Marriage House'. It ceased to be a toll bridge in 1826.

== Listed building ==
The Coldstream Bridge 'that part in England' (Northumberland) was Grade II* listed in 1952, being described in the English Heritage listing as "an ambitious, well-proportioned, and carefully-detailed C18 bridge design."

The Coldstream Bridge '(that part in Scotland) over the Tweed' (Scottish Borders) was Category A listed in 1971, being described in the Historic Scotland listing as "A very fine example of an 18th century bridge design by pre-eminent civil engineer John Smeaton, his first example of a bridge executed in fine dressed sandstone with classical detailing and forming a prominent structure in the landscape of the border between Scotland and England."

== Structure ==
The bridge is made of "squared and tooled sandstone blocks with ashlar dressings". A circular oculus in the spandrel above each pier is filled in with whinstone rubble. The five main arches each have an arch band and a triple keystone; the arches grow larger and higher towards the bridge's centre. There is a smaller semicircular flood arch at either end, with pendent keystones. A weir named the Cauld immediately downstream of the bridge has protected it from erosion since 1785.

== Gallery ==
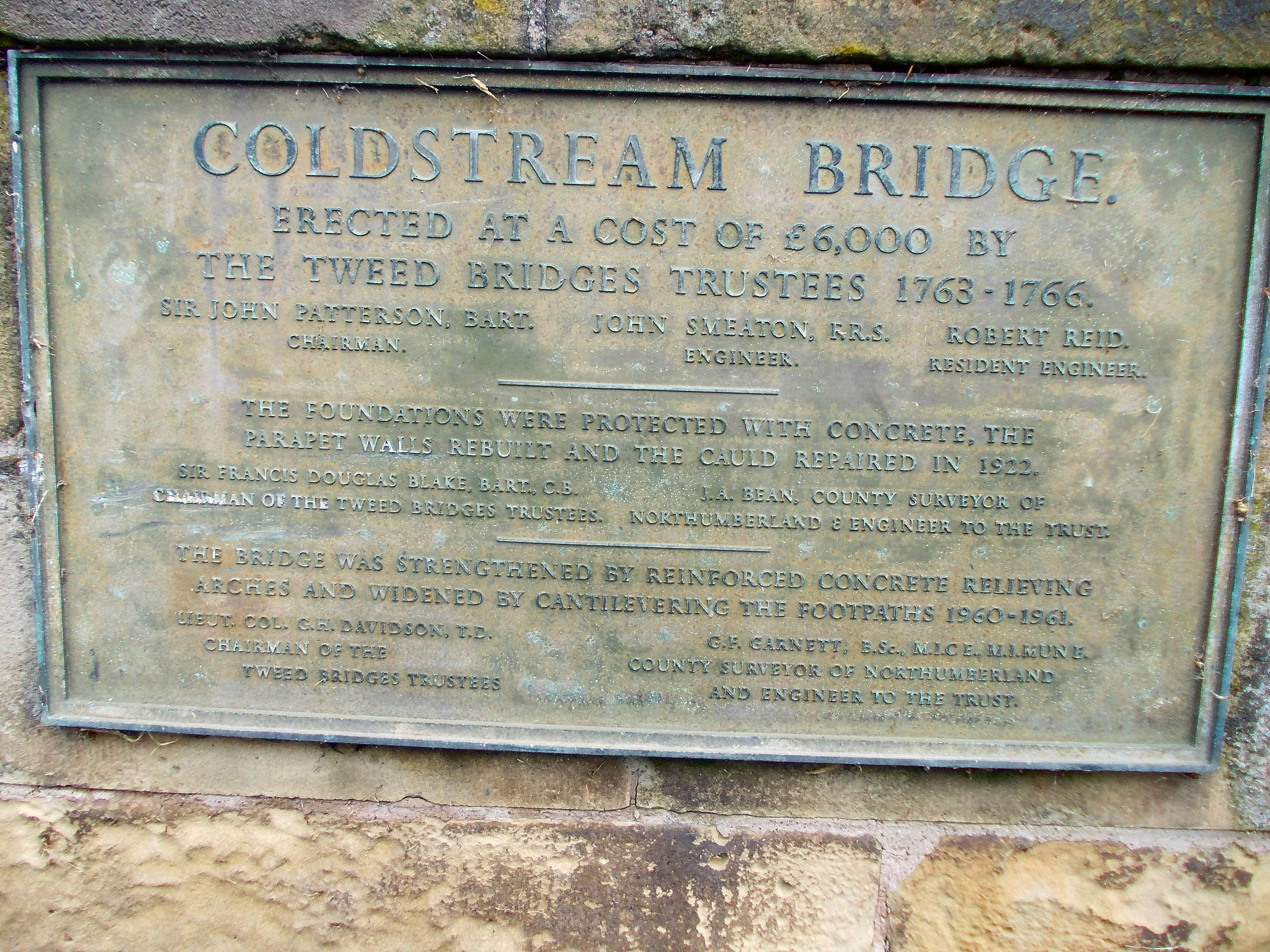
Plaque listing builders, engineers, and building works

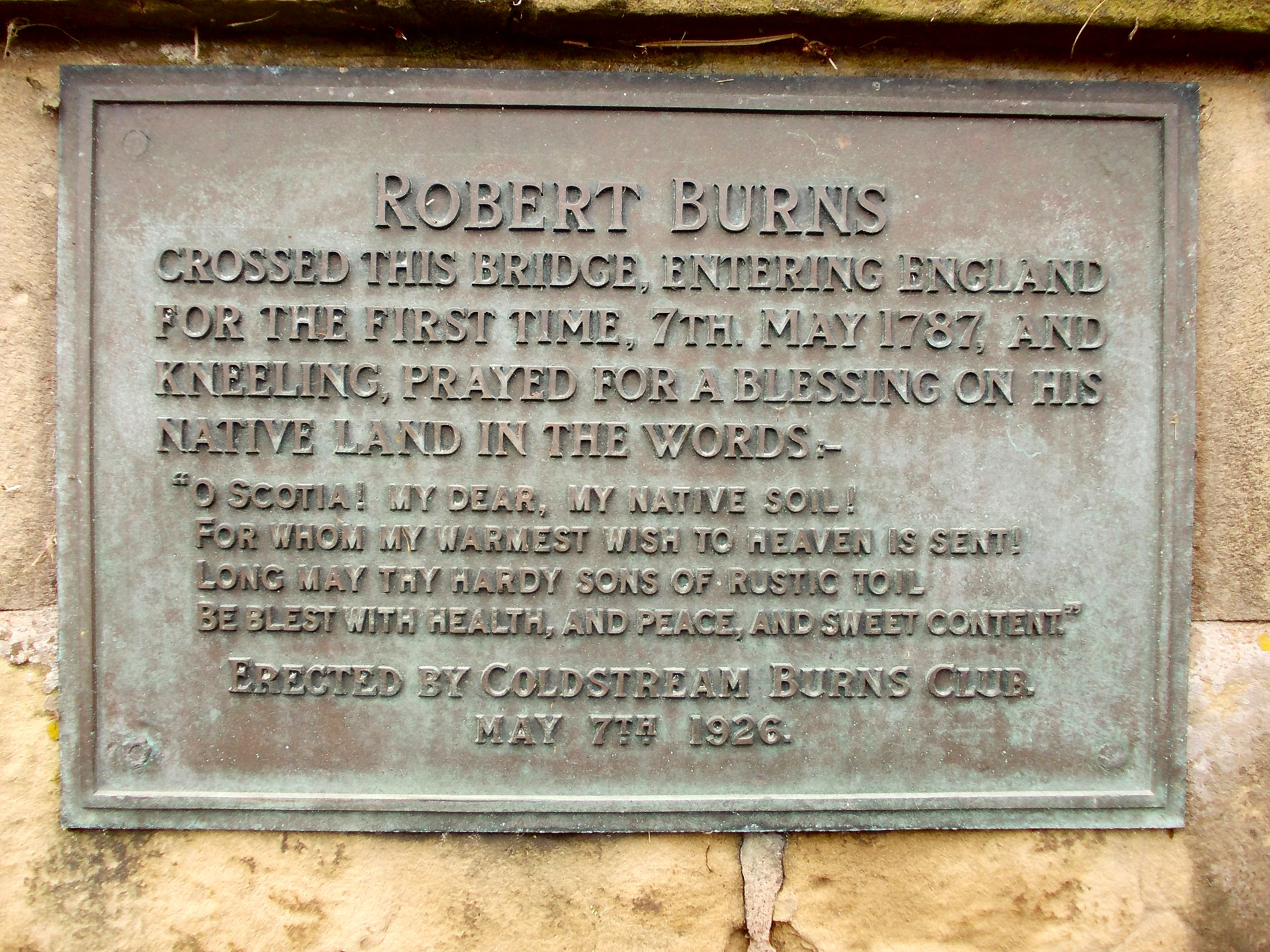
Robert Burns plaque

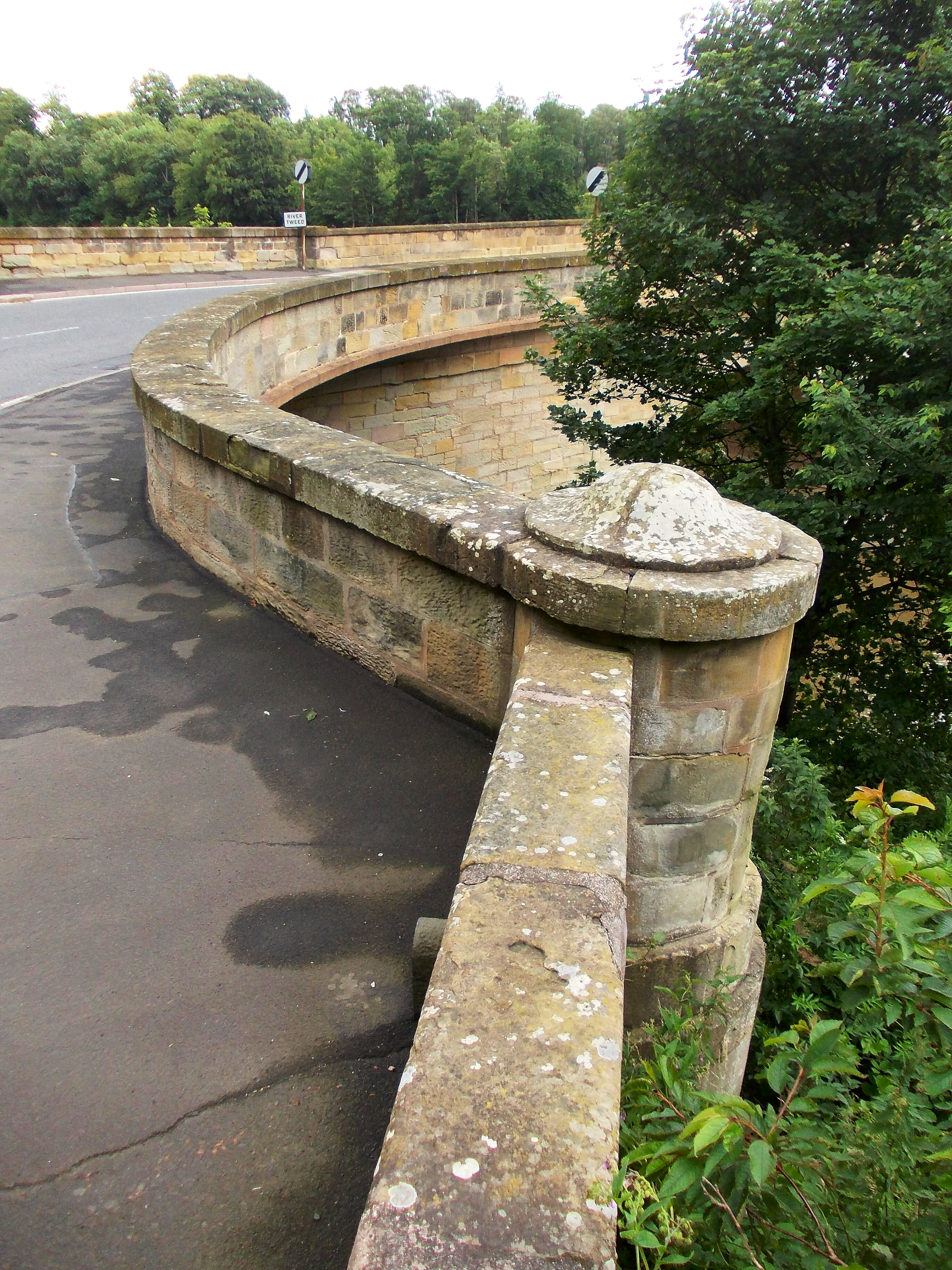
Round buttress on Scottish side

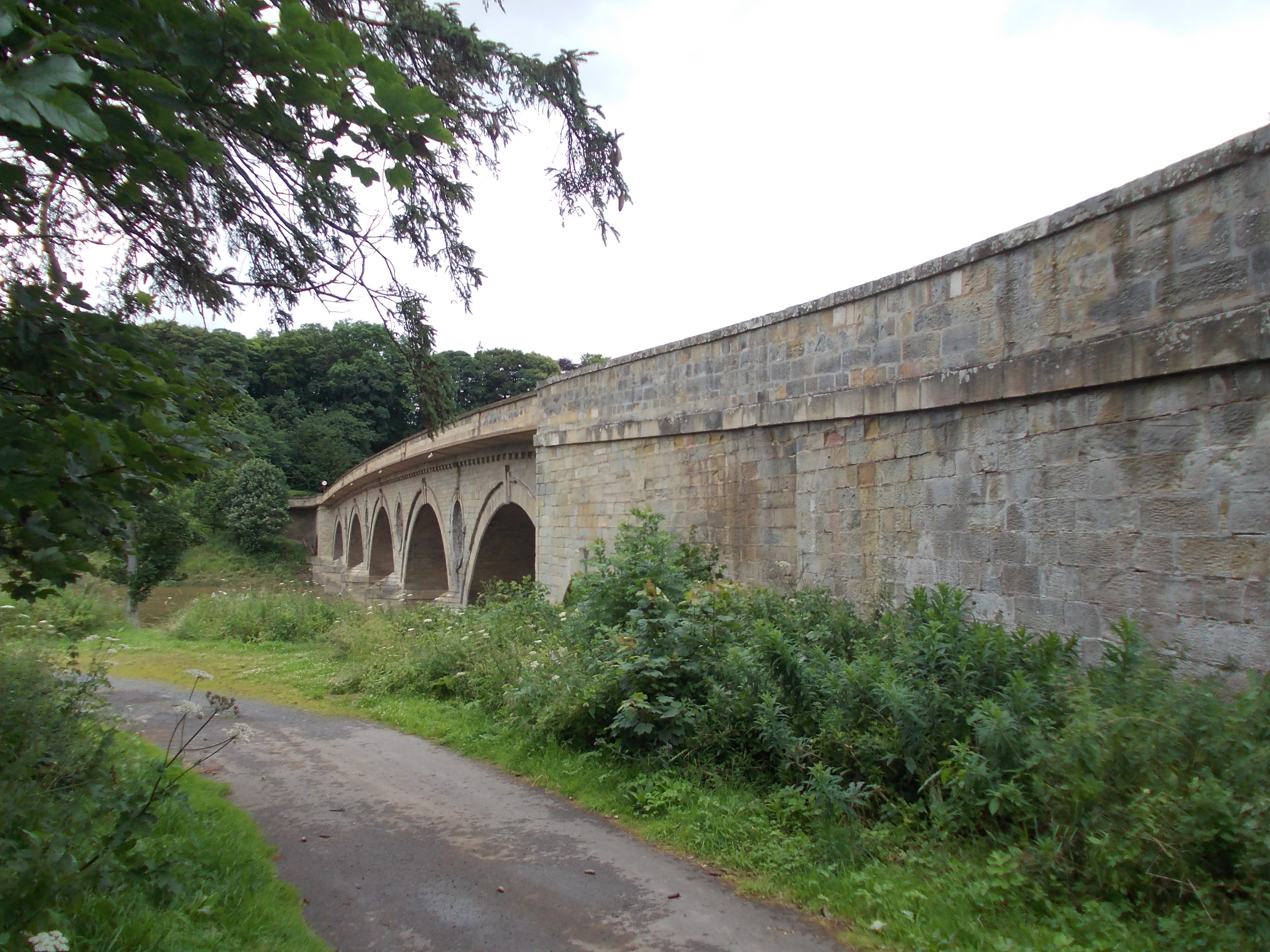
Cantilevered footpaths, seen from English side

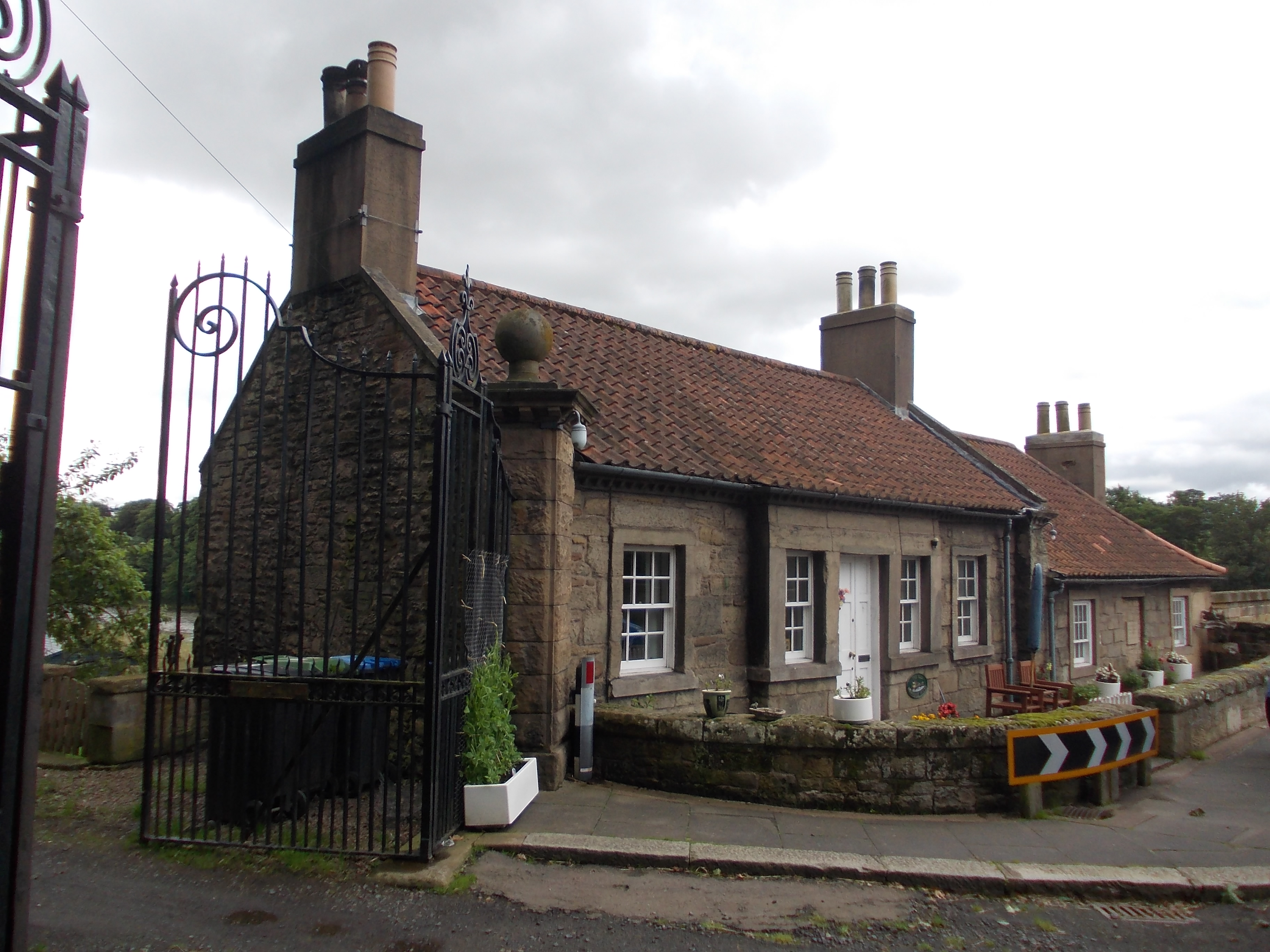
The bridge house controversially built for resident engineer Robert Reid, later used as Marriage House and as Toll House

== See also ==
- List of places in the Scottish Borders
- List of places in Scotland
