= Crosby Hall =

Crosby Hall may refer to:

- Crosby Hall, London, a Grade II* listed building in Cheyne Walk, Chelsea, London, England
- Crosby Hall, Liverpool, an ancient building near Liverpool, England
