= Burscough Methodist Church =

Coordinates: 53.60342°N 2.84435°W

- Burscough Methodist Church
- OS grid reference: SD 44224 12202
- Location: Burscough, Lancashire
- Country: England
- Denomination: Methodist
- Website: Burscough Methodist Church

History
- Former name: Wesleyan Chapel at Burscough Bridge
- Status: Church

Architecture
- Functional status: Active
- Architect: T. Bridge
- Architectural type: Chapel
- Style: English Gothic architecture
- Years built: 1868-9
- Groundbreaking: 19 July 1868
- Completed: 26 March 1869
- Construction cost: £800 (Note: Comparing labour cost between 1869 and 2015, £800 is valued at approximately £443,600.00 by MeasuringWorth.com)

Specifications
- Materials: Brick

Burscough Methodist Church, formally Wesleyan Chapel at Burscough Bridge, is situated in Burscough and is part of the Lancashire West Methodist Circuit. It was built in between 1868 and 1869 of a brick construction in a cruciform layout. The church was opened on 26 March 1869, with construction coming in under budget. The contractor, foreman and architect all donated gifts to the church for its opening, as did the Mayor of Southport. A large portion of the church was used by the Methodist's Sunday school.

== Location ==
Burscough Methodist Church is on Orrell Lane in Burscough, located to the west of the A59 road and to the north of the Leeds Liverpool Canal. Prior to the completion of the church building in 1869, the group had met in a room on Bridge Street which became too small for the growing congregation. Burscough Methodist Church was originally known as the "Wesleyan Chapel at Burscough"

== Construction ==
Construction began on 20 July 1868 with a ceremony to celebrate the laying of foundation stone by James Wood. Around 600 people attended, with the local railway offering reduced fares for the occasion. Wood was presented with an inscribed silver trowel as a gratitude for laying the stone and his generous donations towards to development.

The building was designed by architect T. Bridge in "early pointed style of architecture", and construction was overseen by his father, E. Bridge. The church was built of bricks in a cruciform layout, including a 50 feet (15 m) spire. The nave measured 46 by 30 feet (14.0 by 9.1 m), the transepts 42 by 18 feet (12.8 by 5.5 m) each and the chancel 16 by 8 feet (4.9 by 2.4 m). It included lancet windows in pairs or trios, arched ceilings and coloured brick arches around the doors and windows. The church included an entrance porch constructed from a wooden design.

Although the construction cost was estimated at £950 (worth approximately £527,000 in 2015) (Note: Comparing labour cost between 1869 and 2015, £950 is valued at approximately £526,800.00 by MeasuringWorth.com) the building was constructed under budget at a cost of £800 (worth approximately £444,000 in 2015). A number of gifts were given to the church including the communion table from the builder, E. Bridge, the pulpit from the foreman, Anthony Derby and carpets from the Meek family of Preston and Wigan. The Mayor of Southport, Dr. Woods, and his wife donated a hymn book & bible, which were bound in Morocco, as well as a red silk cushion for pulpit and the marble mantle-piece for the vestry.

== Opening of the Church ==
The building was officially opened on 26 March 1869 with a public ceremony and the church was said to be "filled to overflowing". At the time of opening the Church was divided by a wooden screen and only the nave was used for church purposes, the rest was for the use by the attached school In 1870 the church was given the rights to conduct marriage ceremonies.

The school next door to the church, Burscough Bridge Methodist School, was opened on 9 January 1871.

== Renovations ==
In 1906, the church was renovated with internal decoration and a new roof at a cost of £200 (worth approximately £74,000 in 2015). (Note: Comparing labour cost between 1906 and 2015, £200 is valued at approximately £73,560.00 by MeasuringWorth.com) Then in 1938 a stained glass window was replaced in memory to Francis Henry Rouffignac who was headteacher at the attached Burscough Methodist School.

A significant renovation was undertaken at the church in 2014 at a cost over £300,000 The changes included making the church accessible for wheel-chair users, creating a reception area with a new entrance and windows to the northern elevation. The church is part of the Lancashire West Methodist Circuit
