= William Blundell of Crosby =

English Royalist landowner and topographer

William Blundell
- Arms: Sable, ten Billets, 4, 3, 2 and 1, Argent
- Born: 15 July 1620/1625; Crosby Hall, Little Crosby, Lancashire (now Merseyside)
- Died: 24 May 1698; Crosby Hall, Little Crosby, Lancashire
- Buried: St. Helen's Church, Sefton, Lancashire (now Merseyside)
- Spouse: Ann Haggerston (m. 1640)
- Issue: Nicholas Blundell
- Father: Nicholas Blundell
- Mother: Jane Bradshaigh
- Military career
- Allegiance: Royalists
- Rank: Captain
- Conflicts: English Civil War

William Blundell (15 July 1620/1625 – 24 May 1698), sometimes styled "of Crosby", was an English landowner and topographer and an officer in the Royalist army during the English Civil War.

== Life ==
William was born at Crosby Hall, Lancashire, the son of Nicholas Blundell by Jane, daughter of Roger Bradshaigh, of Haigh, near Wigan, into a family of ancient landed gentry. The Blundells were recusant Roman Catholics and William was probably sent to be educated at one of the schools that were then secretly maintained by Catholics in various parts of England. At the age of fifteen, around 1640, he married Ann, daughter of Sir Thomas Haggerston, Bart., of Haggerston, Northumberland, and Alice, née Banaster.

At the outbreak of the Civil War in 1642, William accepted a captain's commission from Sir Thomas Tildesley, authorising him to raise a company of one hundred dragoons for the Royal cause. He joined in the march to Lancaster, where he received a serious wound when his thigh was shattered by a musket-shot. From then until the end of the war his life was marked by privation and financial anxieties. Under a law of 1646 by which no Papist delinquent could compound for his estate, all his real property was seized and remained in the control of the commissioners for nine or ten years. Eventually he repurchased it at a cost of 1,340l, but he was further burdened with the arrears of the rents reserved to the Crown, arising out of frequent grants for recusancy, some of which had never been discharged. These went back as far as the reign of Elizabeth, and William was forced by the government to pay 1,167l. 15s. 6½d. The cost of making out the enormous bill added to the account an additional 34l. 10s. 2d. This extraordinary document, a roll of twenty feet in length, is still preserved.

After the Civil War Blundell retired to Crosby Hall, where he died 24 May 1698 in the seventy-eighth year of his age, and was buried in the family chapel of St Helen's Church, Sefton. His estate was inherited by his son and heir, the diarist Nicholas Blundell.

== Works ==
- A Short Treatise on the Penal Laws. [This exists in manuscript at Crosby, but a printed copy cannot be found, although the author states that a few copies were printed in London]
- An Exact Chronographical and Historical Discovery of the hitherto unknown Isle of Man, containing a true and perfect description of this island at large; the history of their antient kings, late lords, and bishops of y^{e} island, the ceremonies of their inaugurations, and installments, &c. [Edited by William Harrison for the Manx Society: A History of the Isle of Man, 2 vols., Douglas, 1876–77, 8vo]
- Manuscript Commonplace Books, kept on the method described by Drexilius in his Aurifodina [A selection of the most interesting of the original notes, anecdotes, and observations, in these volumes has been published, with introductory chapters, by the Rev. Thomas Ellison Gibson: Crosby Records, a Cavalier's Note Book, London, 1880, 4to]

== Sources ==
- Baker, Geoff (2013). Reading and Politics in Early Modern England: The Mental World of a Seventeenth-Century Catholic Gentleman. Manchester: Manchester University Press.
- Blundell, Margaret (ed.) (1933). Cavalier; Letters of William Blundell to his Friends. London: Longman, Green & Co..
- McArthur, Euan David (2023). "William Blundell and the Authorship of A History of the Isle of Man (C.1648–1656)", Notes & Queries, 70 (1), 26–29.
- Cooper, Thompson (1886). "Blundell, William" . In Stephen, Leslie (ed.). Dictionary of National Biography. Vol. 5. London: Smith, Elder & Co. p. 267.
