= History of Lancashire =

The Red Rose of Lancaster is the county flower of Lancashire, and a common symbol for the county.

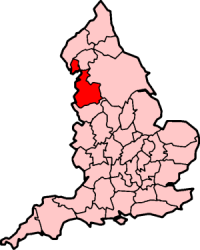
Lancashire, nicknamed "The Red Rose County" within England, showing ancient extent

Lancashire is a county of England, in the northwest of the country. The county did not exist in 1086, for the Domesday Book, and was apparently first created in 1182, making it one of the youngest of the traditional counties.

The historic county consisted of two separate parts. The main part runs along the northwestern coast of England. When it included Manchester and Liverpool, it had a greatest length of 76 miles, and breadth of 45 miles, and an area of 1,208,154 acres. The northern detached part of the old county palatine, consisting of Furness and Cartmel, was 25 miles in length, 23 miles in breadth and was separated from the main portion of Lancashire by Morecambe Bay and the Kendal district of Westmorland. The highest point in the historic county is 803 metres (2,633 ft) at the Old Man of Coniston.

As a county palatine, the Duke of Lancaster had sovereignty rights in the areas of justice and administration within the county. However the third man to hold the title, Henry Bolingbroke, seized the English throne in 1399 to become Henry IV and both the duchy and palatinate have since been possessions of the crown, administered separately but consistently with the rest of the country. The later part of the 19th century brought large reforms with much of the county's independent legal system merged into the national courts and a new administrative county and network of county boroughs being formed. Since then Lancashire County Council has been seated at County Hall in Preston.

In 1974 the administrative county was abolished and new ceremonial counties created with the areas around the cities of Manchester and Liverpool forming the larger portions of Greater Manchester and Merseyside. The section north of Morecambe Bay joined Westmorland and Cumberland to form the modern county of Cumbria. However the new Lancashire gained control of the Forest of Bowland and West Craven areas formerly under the administration of the West Riding of Yorkshire.

Throughout these changes, historic Lancashire still continues to be recognised as a geographical and cultural area by the British Government. The historic county palatine boundaries are also still recognised and unmoved with Lancaster still being recognised as the county town. Traditional borders are still followed by organisations such as the Lancashire FA.

The High Sheriffs of Lancashire, Greater Manchester and Merseyside are still appointed by the King in right of the duchy. The duchy also benefits from the legal concept of bona vacantia within county palatine, whereby it has the right to property for which the legal owner cannot be found. The proceeds are divided between two registered charities, the Duchy of Lancaster Benevolent Fund and the Duchy of Lancaster Jubilee Trust.

The emblem of the historic county of Lancashire is the Red Rose of the English royal House of Lancaster, and in 2008 the Flag of Lancashire became recognised by the Flag Institute. On 27 November, Lancashire Day celebrates the culture of the historic county ranging from its history to its own dialect.

== Toponymy ==
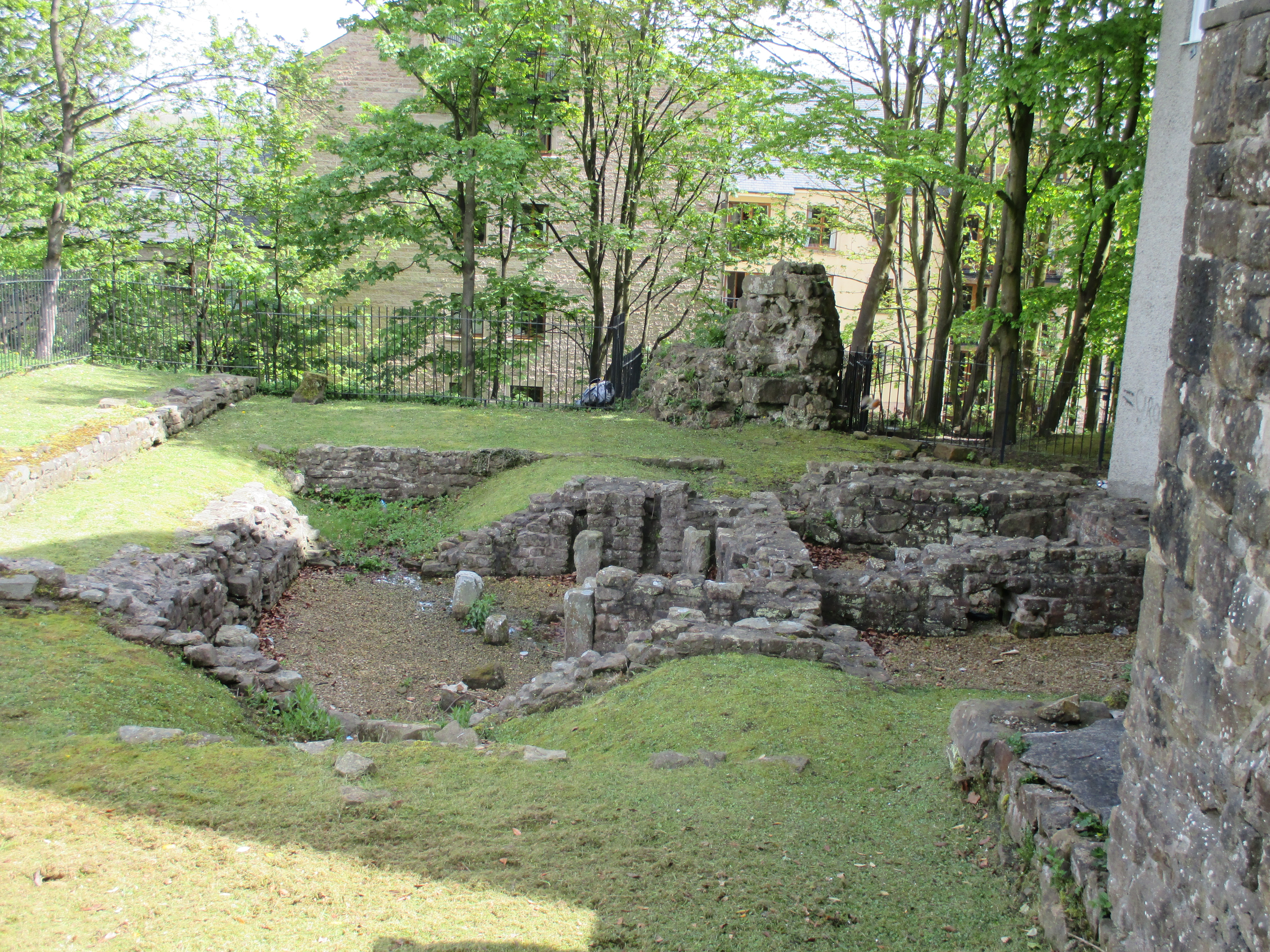
Roman baths at Castle Hill, Lancaster.

Lancashire takes its name from the city of Lancaster, whose name means 'Roman fort on the River Lune', combining the name of the river with the Old English cæster, which derived from the Roman word for a fort or camp. Official documents often called it the "County of Lancaster" rather than Lancashire; "Lancastershire" occurs in late 14th century, and Leland was still using it in 1540. "Lancashire" occurs in the Paston Letters in 1464. Lancashire became the preferred designation, as a syncope of Lancastershire.

== Background ==
Hundreds of Lancashire

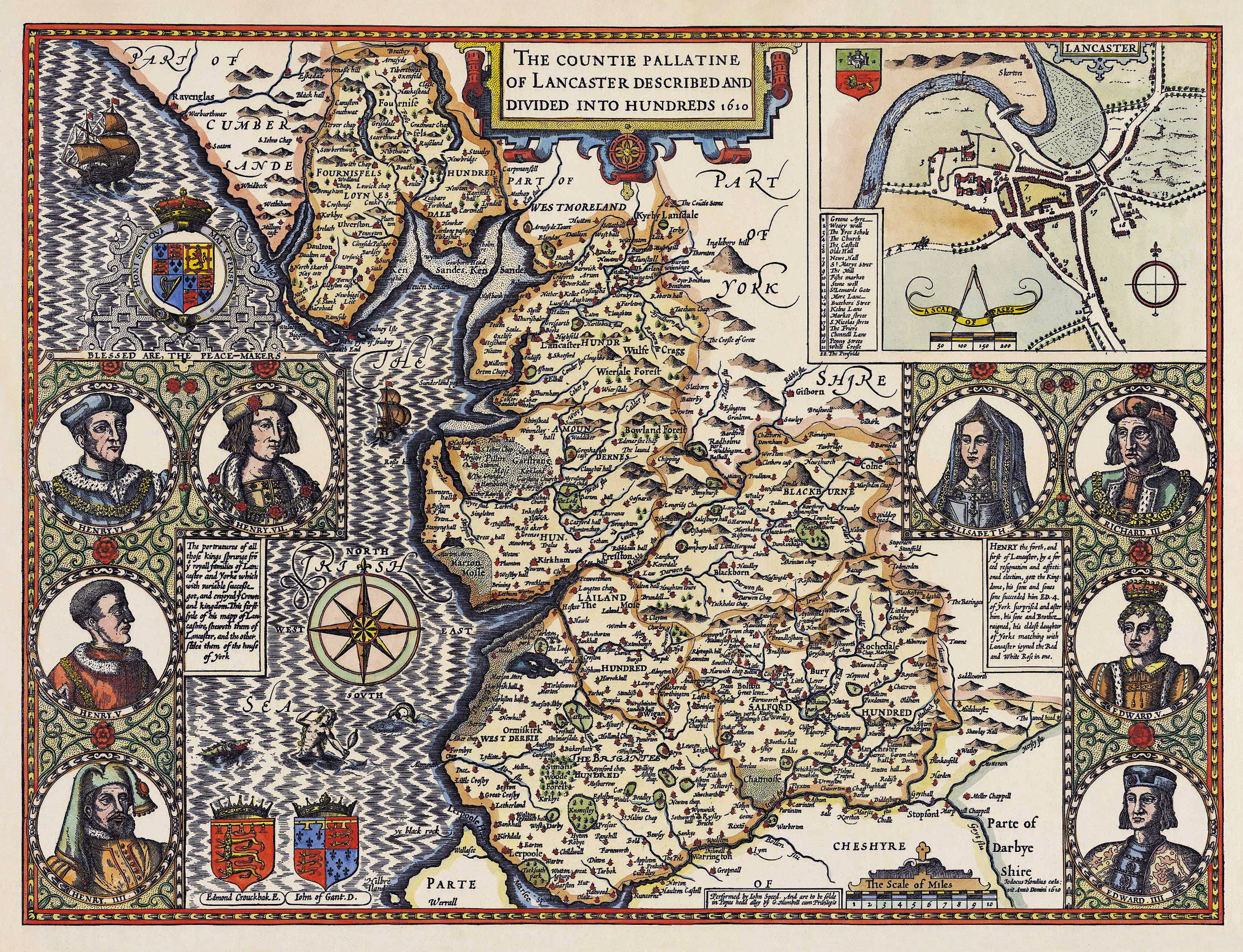
John Speed's map of the County Palatine of Lancaster, 1610

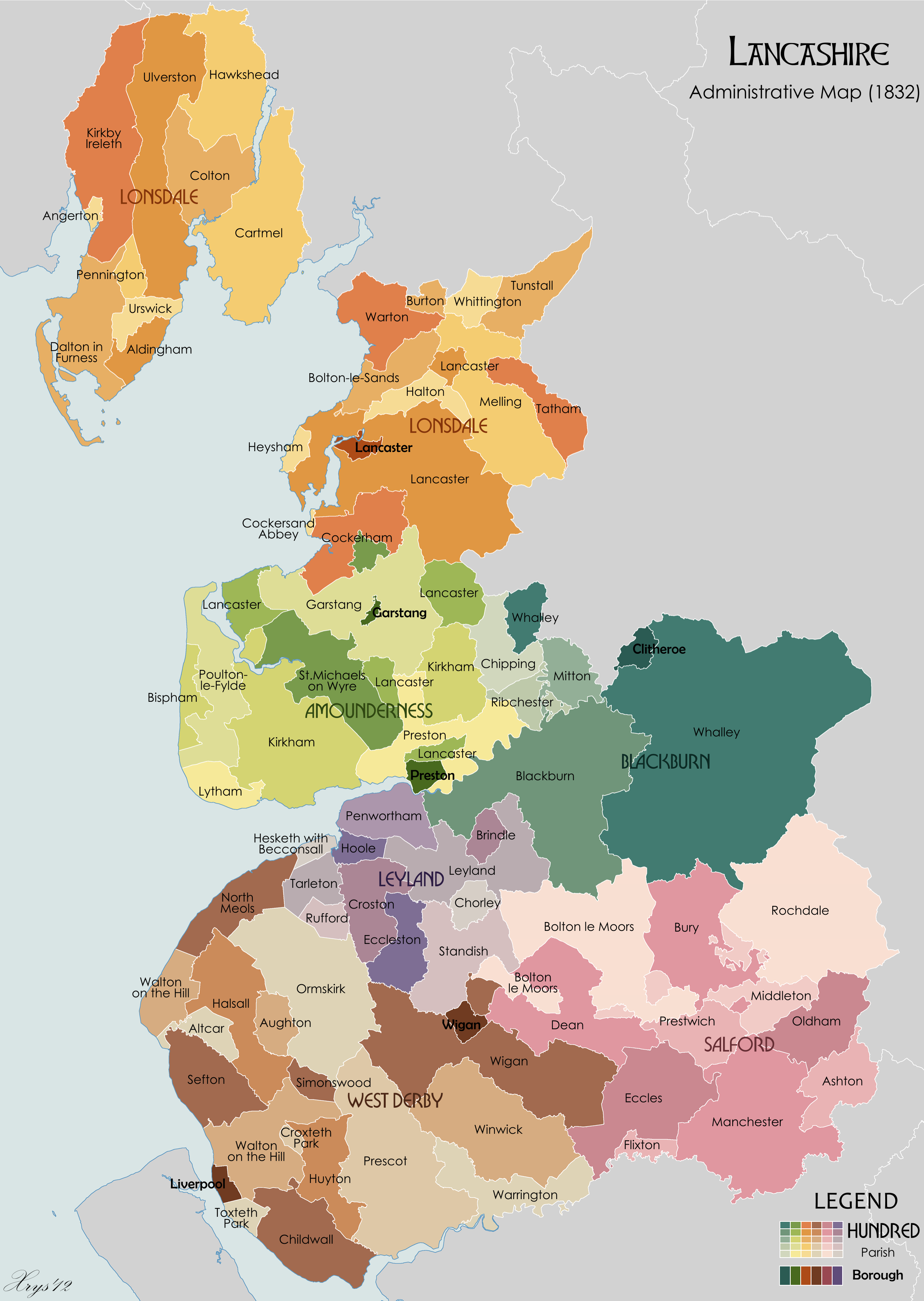
Lancashire in 1832 (click to enlarge)

At the time when the Romans arrived in England, much of northern England was inhabited by the Brigantes, though the Cumbrian highland area was inhabited by the Carvetii, who were possibly a tribe within the larger Brigantes group. Another tribe named the Setantii has also been hypothesized based on the name of a Roman era port near the mouth of the River Wyre, called Portus Setantiorum, and they were possibly also Brigantes, if they existed.

The remains of Roman forts exist at Burscough, Manchester, Lancaster, Over Burrow, Ribchester, Kirkham and Castleshaw. A number of Roman roads are known to have existed including one between Manchester and Carlisle, via Ribchester and Burrow. It is thought that a cluster of Romano-British farmsteads existed to the east of Burnley

The land that would become the ancient county of Lancashire had been part of the Kingdom of Northumbria. The River Mersey, and further east, its tributary the River Tame, was considered the border with Mercia. The Anglo-Saxon Chronicle records that in 923, Edward the Elder brought an army to Mercia and ordered the repair of the defences at Manchester in Northumbria. It seems that from this time the area south of the Ribble became associated with Mercia.

After the Norman Conquest, William the Conqueror gave to Roger de Poitou, lands spanning eight ancient counties, which included the area between the River Ribble and the Mersey and Amounderness. However, by the time of the Domesday survey, most of his lands are recorded to be under the king's control. In the Domesday Book, some of its lands had been treated as part of Yorkshire. The area in between the Rivers Mersey and Ribble (referred to in the Domesday Book as "Inter Ripam et Mersam") formed part of the returns for Cheshire. Although some have taken this to mean that, at this time, south Lancashire was part of Cheshire, it is not clear that this was the case, and more recent research indicates that the boundary between Cheshire and what was to become Lancashire remained the river Mersey. South of the Ribble was surveyed as six hundreds: Blackburn, Derby, Leyland, Newton, Salford and Warrington. The entries are brief, and unusually intermix the Anglo-Saxon hide with the Danelaw carucate as units of measurement. The entries for the north, consist of little more than lists of manors. Amounderness appears as a district, apparently stretching inland to the River Hodder, the hundred is thought to have been created shortly afterwards. Lonsdale was also not recorded as a hundred, the name only appears apparently as a manor attached to Cockerham.

The town of Lancaster itself was at this time apparently administratively united (to the extent it could be administered) with Kendal, Furness and Cartmell, but not with the area south of the Ribble river. This contiguous area of relatively undeveloped highland was administered by men such as Ivo de Taillebois, and a local aristocracy which still included a number of Anglo-Saxons. This is proposed by authors such as William Farrer to be the reason why the first Barons of Kendal used the surname "de Lancaster" despite Kendal not becoming a permanent part of the later developed county of Lancaster.

== Early history ==
The lands granted to Roger de Poitou, but recorded in Domesday as crown lands, were soon returned to Roger. In the early 1090s Lonsdale, Cartmel and Furness were added to Roger's lands, thus making him responsible for the defence of the area south of Morecambe Bay from Scottish raiding parties. In 1102 Roger forfeited all his English lands after supporting Robert Curthose in a failed rebellion against King Henry I. The Lonsdale Hundred was created sometime during the late 11th or early 12th centuries, certainly by 1168. Place-name evidence suggests that previous district included areas within the River Lune's watershed, not included in the new hundred.

Lancashire, like many northern counties fell prey to Scottish raids from King David I of Scotland with the Battle of Clitheroe in 1138 where the county was then briefly a part of Scotland, to Robert the Bruce with the Great Raid of 1322, reaching as far south as Chorley.

From 1164 until 1189 the honour of Lancaster was held by the crown and its accounts are recorded in the Pipe rolls. It was usually included under Yorkshire or Northumberland, as when the first reference to a County of Lancaster occurs in 1168 in the accounts of the sheriff. In 1182 Lancaster recorded as a separate shire, with a note stating "because there was no place for it in Northumberland".

After 1194 the honour was again in the possession of the crown, but in 1267 Edmund Crouchback (father of the House of Lancaster) the son of King Henry III was created the 1st Earl of Lancaster. Henry de Lacy the Earl of Lincoln at this time held the baronies of Clitheroe, Penwortham and Halton and the lordships of Rochdale and Bury in this area. With his death in 1311, ownership passed to Crouchback's son Thomas, 2nd Earl of Lancaster who had been married to Henry's daughter, Alice. Thomas was executed as a rebel and replaced by his younger brother Henry, 3rd Earl of Lancaster. In 1351 Henry's son, Henry of Grosmont, became the first Duke of Lancaster with palatine jurisdiction within the county. This placed the administration of justice in the county under control of the duke and he appointed his own justices to hear pleas of the Crown and all other common law pleas. He also appointed the Sheriff, coroners and other local officers including an escheator. He also appointed a Chancellor and established a Chancery to issue the writs required for the administration of the Palatinate.

The powers had been granted only for Henry's lifetime and after the duke's death in 1361 the palatinate (and title) ceased to exist. One of Henry's daughter's was married to John of Gaunt, the son of Edward III and the dukedom was recreated for him the next year. Before his death in 1377, the king also granted the palatine powers to his son. In 1390 John obtained an extension of this grant from Richard II, enabling his male heirs to inherit control of the palatinate. After John's death in 1399, his exiled son Henry of Bolingbroke returned to England, deposing Richard II and becoming king as Henry IV. Henry IV maintained the duchy separately from the other possessions of the crown and the palatinate's independent judicial system continued, although administered consistently with the rest of the country.

Once its initial boundaries were established, it bordered Cumberland, Westmorland, Yorkshire, and Cheshire. The county was divided into the six hundreds of Amounderness, Blackburn, Leyland, Lonsdale, Salford, and West Derby. Lonsdale was further partitioned into Lonsdale North, which was the detached part north of Morecambe Bay (also known as Furness), and Lonsdale South. Each hundred was sub-divided into parishes. As the parishes covered relatively large areas, they were further divided into townships that were more similar in size to parishes in counties in the south of England. Outside of the administration of the hundreds were the boroughs.

In 1461 Edward IV decreed that the county palatine should become part of the Duchy of Lancaster and from 1471 the offices of Chancellor of the Duchy and Chancellor of the Palatinate were held by the same person. The administrative centre moved to London, while Lancaster remained the legal centre.

After the Revolution of 1688 that deposed the last Stuart king, James II and VII, Lancashire saw conflict with two mostly Scottish pro-Stuart rebellions. The Jacobite rising of 1715 was defeated at the Battle of Preston in 1715. In 1745 Bonnie Prince Charlie marched through Lancashire and Derbyshire, gaining recruits especially from Manchester and Derby. Faced with a larger English army, the Jacobites retreated back to Scotland. The final defeat came at the Battle of Culloden in Scotland the following year.

== Industrial Revolution ==
Lancashire Looms were a mainstay of the Lancashire cotton industry for a century (Queen Street Mill, Burnley).

Districts and county boroughs of Lancashire in 1961
Lancashire in 1961 with districts shown and county boroughs marked	County boroughs: 1. Burnley; 2. Preston; 3. Rochdale; 4. Barrow-in-Furness; 5. Blackpool; 6. Blackburn; 7. Southport; 8. Bury; 9. Bolton; 10. Oldham; 11. Wigan; 12. Manchester; 13. Salford; 14. Bootle; 15. St Helens; 16. Liverpool; 17. Warrington

Lancashire was one of the homes of modern industrialisation. This started with small scale experiments, for example in the automation of weaving. Lancashire had a long history of supplying wool to skilled weavers in Europe and southern England, as well as having many cottager weavers itself by the 18th century. But the advent of increased imports of cotton needing processing was a trigger to innovation. John Kay, Richard Arkwright, Samuel Crompton, and James Hargreaves were from Lancashire.

Around 1700, a blast furnace thought to be the first built in Lancashire, was constructed in the Cliviger gorge.

Prior to the Municipal Corporations Act there were relatively few boroughs in the county. But following the act, 22 towns were incorporated up to 1862 as the county became more populous due to the continuing industrial revolution.

Under the Supreme Court of Judicature Act 1873 the common law and criminal jurisdictions at Lancaster's courts (including the jurisdiction of the Court of Common Pleas) transferred to the new High Court of Justice and the jurisdiction of the Court of Appeal in Chancery of the County Palatine of Lancaster transferred to the Court of Appeal established by that Act. After November 1875 the palatinate consisted only of the Court of Chancery and the Chancellor's right to appoint justices of the peace and other local officers.

County Hall in Preston was built as a home for the county administration, the Quarter Sessions and Lancashire Constabulary) and opened on 14 September 1882. Blackpool Tramway opened in 1885 and is one of the oldest electric tramways in the world.

In 1889, the administrative county of Lancashire was created, covering the historical county except for the county boroughs such as Blackburn, Burnley, Barrow-in-Furness, Preston, Wigan, Liverpool and Manchester.

During the 20th century, the county became increasingly urbanised, particularly the southern part. To the existing county boroughs of Barrow-in-Furness, Blackburn, Bolton, Bootle, Burnley, Bury, Liverpool, Manchester, Oldham, Preston, Rochdale, Salford, St Helens and Wigan were added Blackpool (1904), Southport (1905), and Warrington (1900). The county boroughs also had many boundary extensions. The borders around the Manchester area were particularly complicated, with narrow protrusions of the administrative county between the county boroughs – Lees urban district formed a detached part of the administrative county, between Oldham county borough and the West Riding of Yorkshire.

== Modern history ==
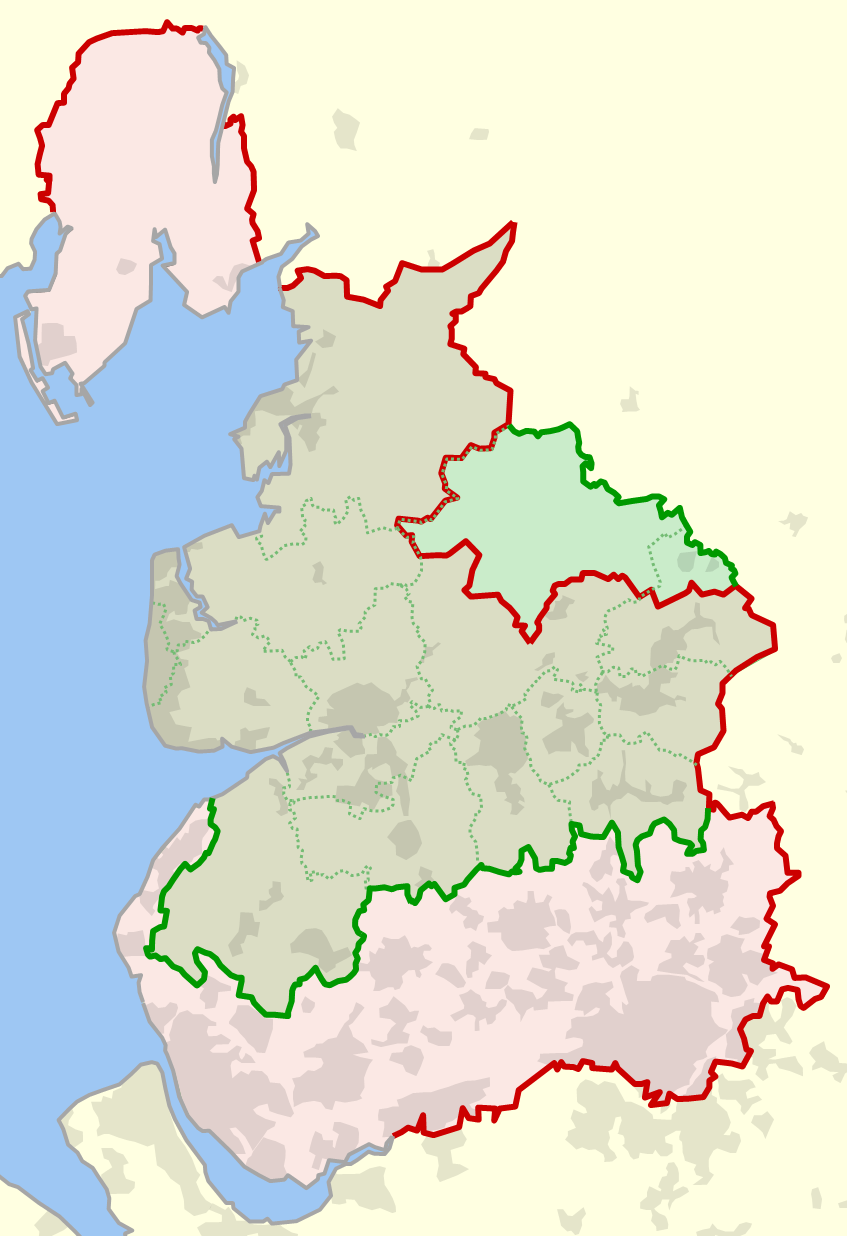
The historic county palatine boundaries in red and the ceremonial county in green

By the census of 1971, the population of Lancashire and its county boroughs had reached 5,129,416, making it the most populous geographic county in the UK. The administrative county was also the most populous of its type outside London, with a population of 2,280,359 in 1961. In 1972, under the Courts Act 1971, the remaining major element of legal system, the Court of Chancery of the County Palatine of Lancaster also merged with the High Court.

On 1 April 1974, under the Local Government Act 1972, the administrative county was abolished, as were the county boroughs. The urbanised southern part largely became part of two metropolitan counties, Merseyside and Greater Manchester.

The boroughs of Liverpool, Knowsley, St Helens and Sefton were included in Merseyside. In Greater Manchester the successor boroughs were Bury, Bolton, Manchester, Oldham (part), Rochdale, Salford, Tameside (part), Trafford (part) and Wigan. Warrington and Widnes, south of the new Merseyside/Greater Manchester border were added to the new non-metropolitan county of Cheshire. The urban districts of Barnoldswick and Earby, Bowland Rural District and the parishes of Bracewell and Brogden and Salterforth from Skipton Rural District in the West Riding of Yorkshire became part of the new Lancashire. One parish, Simonswood, was transferred from the borough of Knowsley in Merseyside to the district of West Lancashire in 1994. In 1998 Blackpool and Blackburn with Darwen became independent of the county as unitary authorities, but remained in Lancashire for ceremonial purposes, including the provision of fire, rescue and policing.

In March 2005, under the Courts Act 2003, the power to appoint magistrates in Lancashire, Greater Manchester and Merseyside transferred to the Ministry of Justice.

Maps of early Lancashire

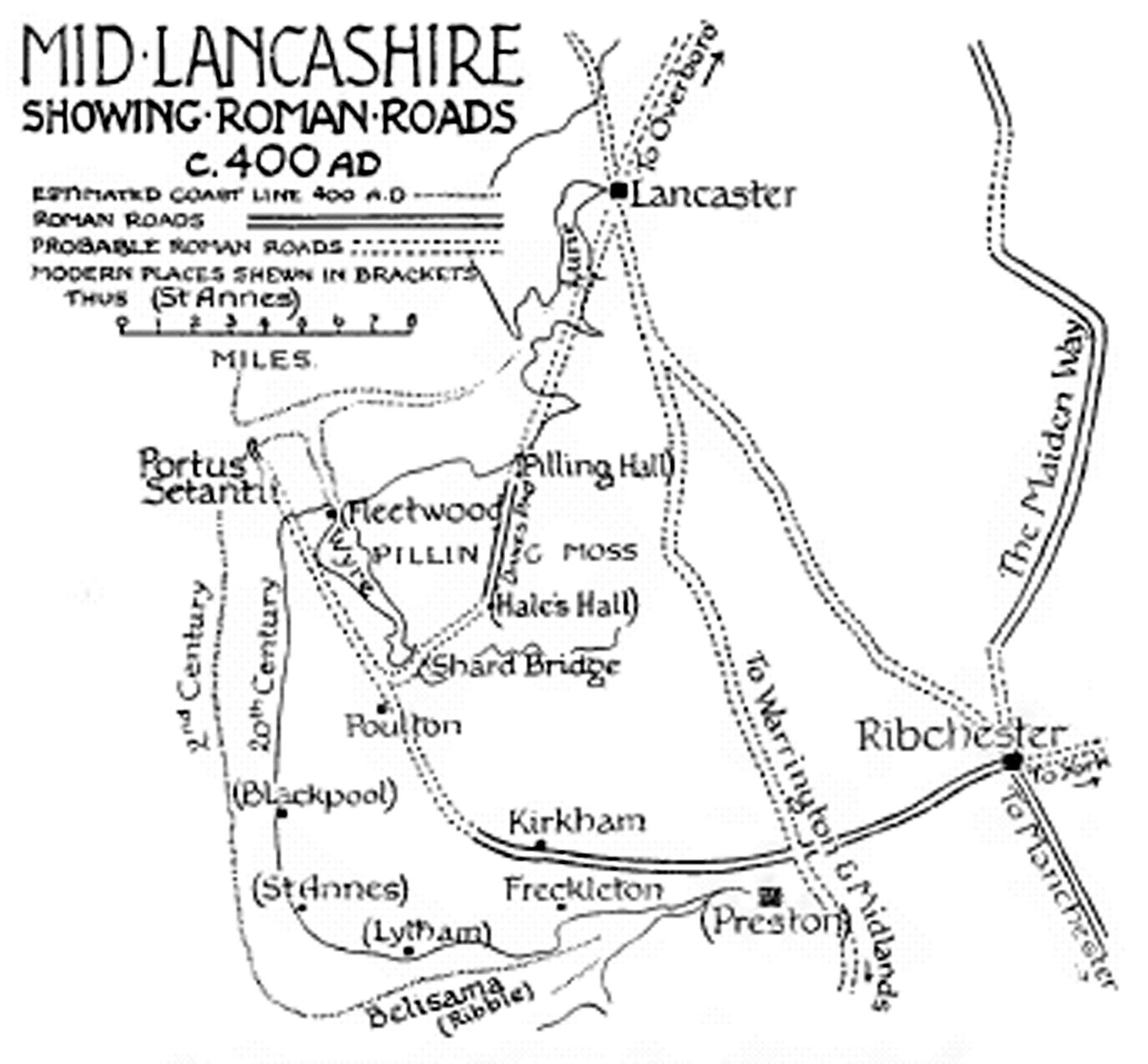
Map of mid-Lancashire, c. 400.

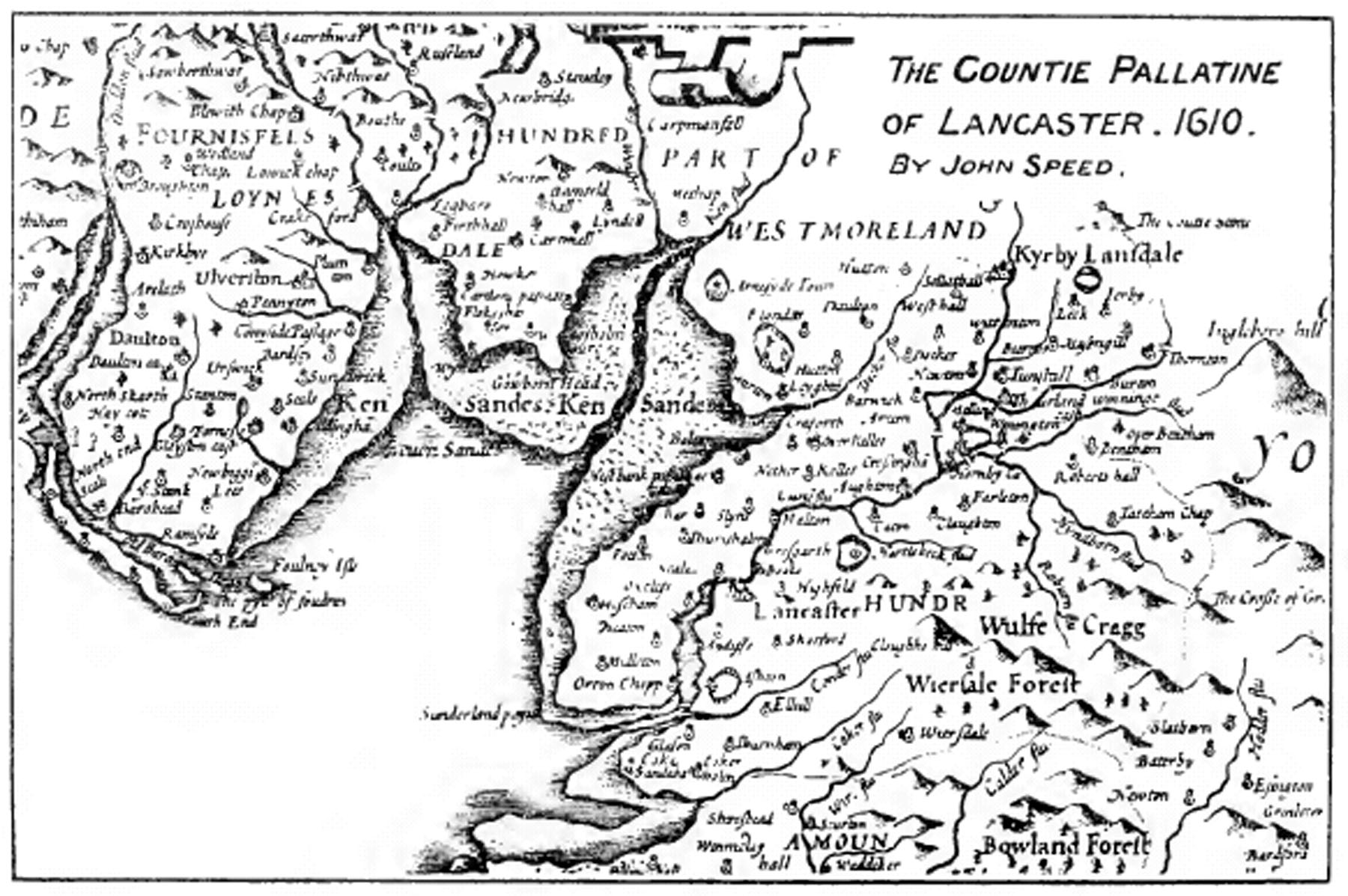
North Lancashire in 1610.

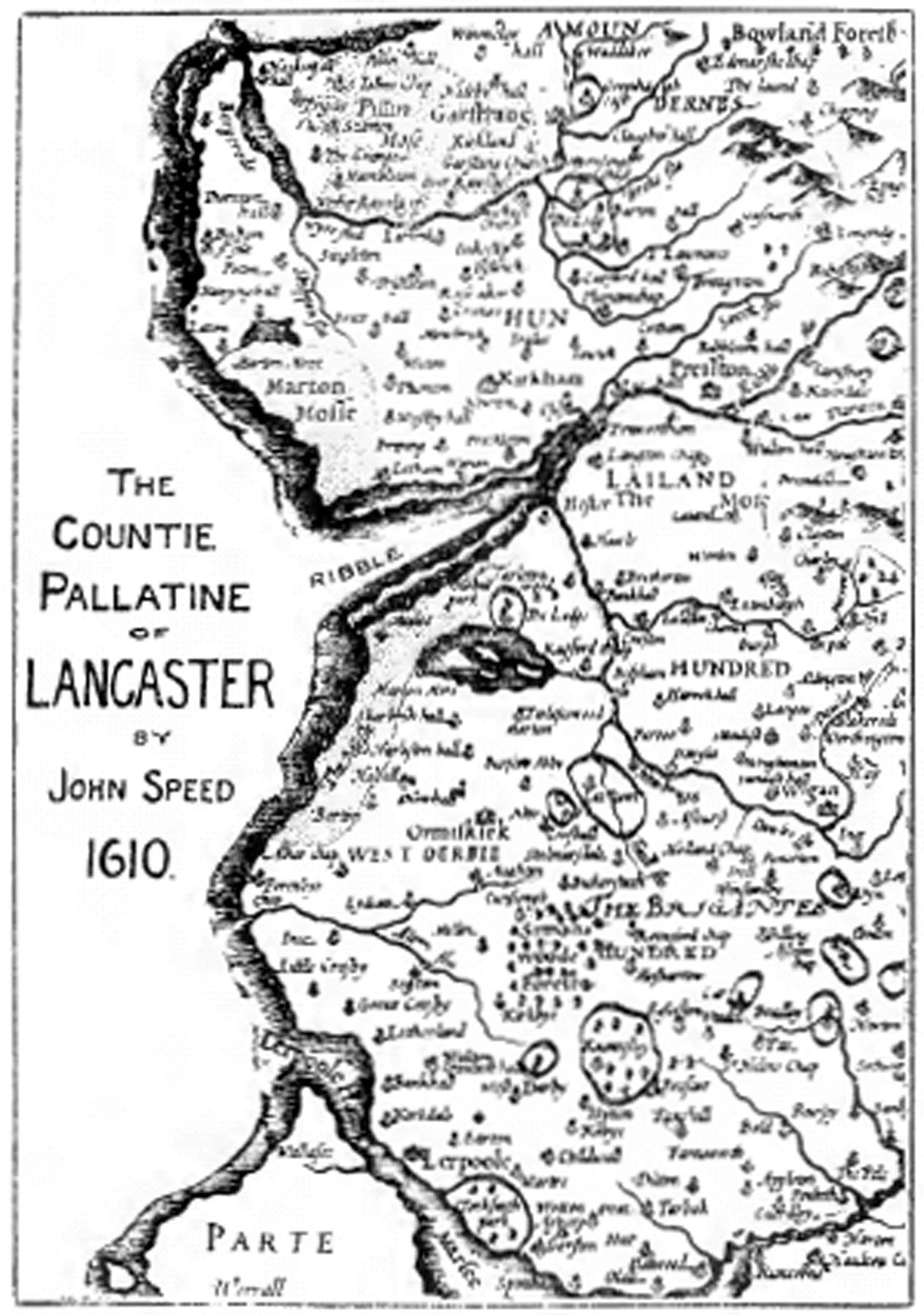
Southwest Lancashire in 1610.

== See also ==
- Duchy of Lancaster
- Grade I listed buildings in Lancashire
- Grade II* listed buildings in Lancashire
- History of Cumbria
- History of England
- History of Liverpool
- History of Manchester
- House of Lancaster
- Lancashire Coalfield
- List of collieries in Lancashire since 1854
- List of mining disasters in Lancashire
- Scheduled monuments in Lancashire

== Bibliography ==
- Farrer, William; Brownbill, John, eds. (1906), The Victoria History of the County of Lancaster Vol 1, Victoria County History, Constable & Co, OCLC 832215399
- Farrer, William; Brownbill, John, eds. (1907), The Victoria History of the County of Lancaster Vol 3, Victoria County History, Constable & Co, OCLC 832215436
- Farrer, William; Brownbill, John, eds. (1911a), The Victoria History of the County of Lancaster Vol 4, Victoria County History, Constable & Co, OCLC 832215452
- Farrer, William; Brownbill, John, eds. (1911b), The Victoria History of the County of Lancaster Vol 5, Victoria County History, Constable & Co, OCLC 832215464
- Farrer, William; Brownbill, John, eds. (1911c), The Victoria History of the County of Lancaster Vol 6, Victoria County History, Constable & Co, OCLC 832215477
- Farrer, William; Brownbill, John, eds. (1912), The Victoria History of the County of Lancaster Vol 7, Victoria County History, Constable & Co, OCLC 832215488
- Farrer, William; Brownbill, John, eds. (1914), The Victoria History of the County of Lancaster Vol 8, Victoria County History, Constable & Co, OCLC 270761426
- Farrer, William (1902), The Lancashire Pipe rolls..., H. Young and Sons, OCLC 2001421
- Kenyon, Denise (1991), The Origins of Lancashire (Origins of the Shire), Manchester University Press, ISBN 0-7190-3546-5
- Tait, James (1904), Mediaeval Manchester and the Beginnings of Lancashire, Manchester: Manchester University Press, OCLC 6057079
- Crosby, A. (1996). A History of Cheshire. (The Darwen County History Series.) Chichester, West Sussex, UK: Phillimore & Co. Ltd. ISBN 0-85033-932-4.
- Harris, B. E., and Thacker, A. T. (1987). The Victoria History of the County of Chester. (Volume 1: Physique, Prehistory, Roman, Anglo-Saxon, and Domesday). Oxford: Oxford University Press. ISBN 0-19-722761-9.
- Morgan, P. (1978). Domesday Book Cheshire: Including Lancashire, Cumbria, and North Wales. Chichester, Sussex: Phillimore & Co. Ltd. ISBN 0-85033-140-4.
- Phillips A. D. M., and Phillips, C. B. (2002), A New Historical Atlas of Cheshire. Chester, UK: Cheshire County Council and Cheshire Community Council Publications Trust. ISBN 0-904532-46-1.
- Samuel Tymms (1837). "Lancashire". Northern Circuit. The Family Topographer: Being a Compendious Account of the ... Counties of England. Vol. 6. London: J.B. Nichols and Son. OCLC 2127940.
