= St Mary's Church, Presbytery and Convent, Little Crosby =

Coordinates: 53.5077°N 3.0275°W

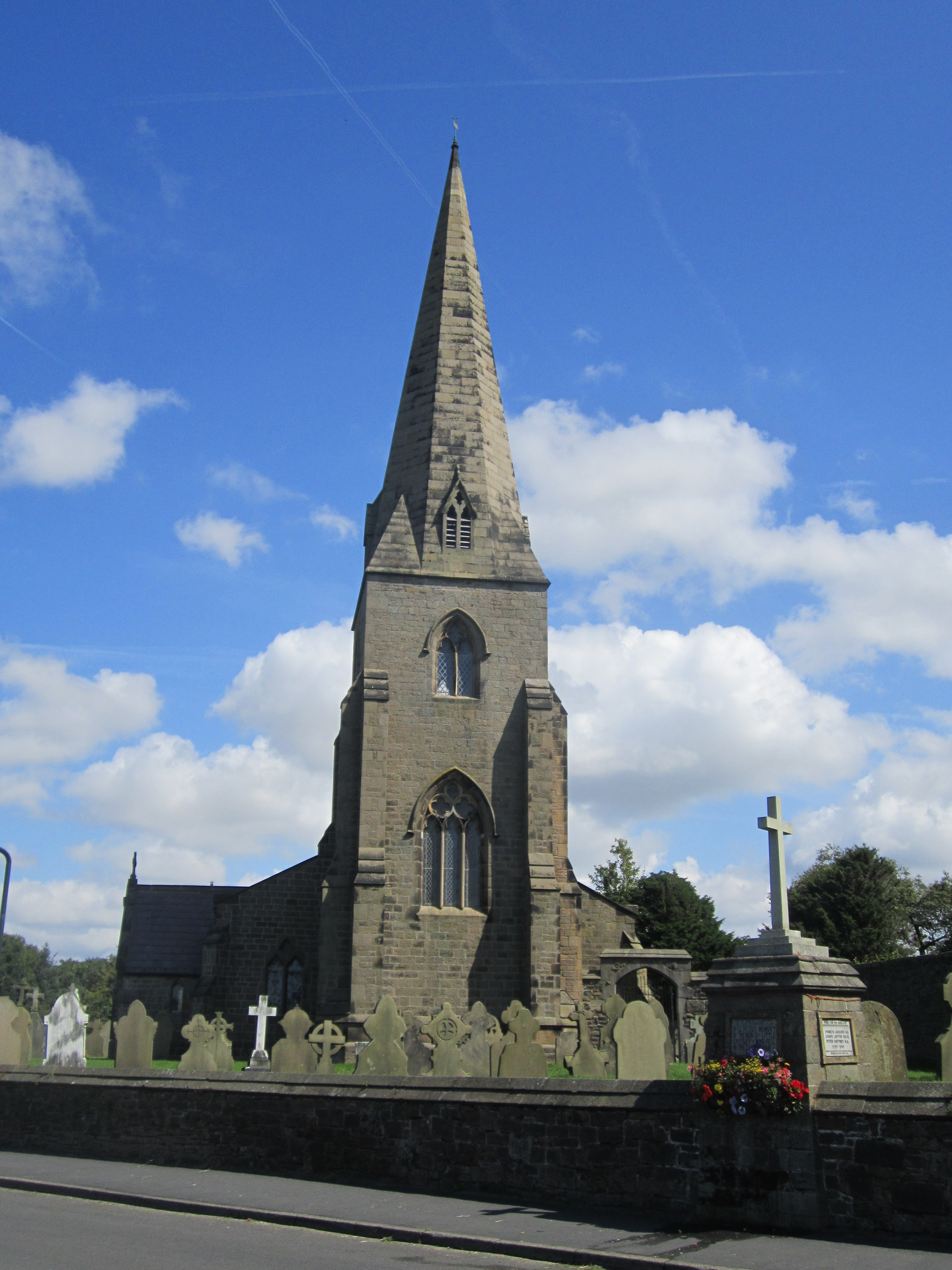
- St Mary's Church, Little Crosby

- Location in Merseyside
- OS grid reference: SD 320 017
- Location: Back Lane, Little Crosby, Sefton, Merseyside
- Country: England
- Denomination: Roman Catholic
- Website: St Mary, Little Crosby

History
- Status: Parish church
- Founder: William Blundell
- Consecrated: 7 September 1847

Architecture
- Functional status: Active
- Heritage designation: Grade II
- Designated: 20 December 1996
- Architect(s): Weightman and Hadfield
- Architectural type: Church
- Style: Gothic Revival (Decorated)
- Groundbreaking: 1845
- Completed: 1847

Specifications
- Materials: Sandstone, slate roofs

Clergy
- Priest: Fr Derek Lloyd

St. Mary's Church, Presbytery and Convent are in Back Lane, Little Crosby, Sefton, Merseyside, England. The church is an active Roman Catholic parish church in the diocese of Liverpool which was built in 1845–47. The presbytery and convent were both built in the 18th century, and altered in the 19th century. The convent originated as a chapel, and has since been converted into a private dwelling. Both the church and the former convent with its attached presbytery are recorded in the National Heritage List for England as designated Grade II listed buildings.

== History ==
The Blundell family of Crosby Hall have been lords of the manor of Little Crosby since the Middle Ages. A recusant Roman Catholic family, they built a chapel and a presbytery near the hall in the early 18th century. There is a date stone on the rear wing of the presbytery dated 1719, and there is surviving 18th-century fabric in the rear windows of the former chapel.

The church was built in 1845–47 and was designed by Weightman and Hadfield, It was paid for by William Blundell, and consecrated on 7 September 1847. Both the presbytery and the chapel were then much altered, the chapel being converted into a convent and schoolroom. In 1883 a south chapel in the form of a transept was added to the church. Later the convent became a private dwelling.

== Architecture ==
=== Church ===
The church is built in coursed sandstone rubble, and it has slate roofs. Its architectural style is simple Decorated Gothic. The design of the church was influenced by Pugin. Its plan consists of a nave, north and south full-height four-bay aisles, a north porch, a chancel with a transeptal chapel to the south and two offices to the north, and a west steeple. The steeple consists of a three-stage tower with angle buttresses and a broach spire. In the middle stage of the tower is a three-light west window, and the top stage contains a two-light window on each side. Between the broaches of the spire are gabled lucarnes containing louvres. The windows along the side of the aisle have two lights.

Inside the church the four-bay arcades consist of two-centred arches carried on octagonal piers with moulded capitals. The tower arch is also two-centred, and it contains a gallery. The nave has a wagon roof. The ceiling was painted by Colonel Nicholas Blundell and his siblings with the Litany of Our Lady. In the chancel are a piscina, a sedilia and, in a recess, a tomb with the recumbent effigy of William Blundell, the donor of the church, who died in 1854. From the chancel a two-bay arcade leads into the Blundell memorial chapel, which was painted with scenes from their family history by Arthur Tomlinson in 1935. In the porch is a repoussé copper plaque in Arts and Crafts style to the memory of other members of the Blundell family. On the north wall of the west gallery is a single-manual 19th-century pipe organ with six stops that was rebuilt in 1990 by S. Reeves of Liverpool.

=== Presbytery ===
The presbytery is built in stuccoed brick with a slate roof, and is in Tudor style. It is two storeys and has a two-bay front with a gabled porch, the gable containing a shield with the date 1850. To the right is a two-storey canted bay window containing mullioned and transomed windows. To the left of the porch is a small lean-to; there are two-light windows in the lean-to and also in the upper storey. At the rear is a wing containing a modern bay window, and a stone plaque inscribed with the date 1719 and the Blundell shield.

=== Former convent ===
This building, originally a chapel, then a convent and schoolroom, and later converted into a house, is in brick with a stone-slate roof, and is also in Tudor style. It has two storeys with a projecting gabled two-storey former porch in the centre of the front. In the upper storey of the porch is a carved shield dated 1859. To the left of the porch is a segmental-headed doorway. The windows on the front are either two-light and mullioned, or small and rectangular. At the rear of the building are the remains of three 18th-century round-headed chapel windows with voussoirs and keystones, other inserted windows, and a single-storey service wing.

== Appraisal ==
Both the church, and the presbytery and attached former convent, were designated as Grade II listed buildings on 20 December 1996. Pollard and Pevsner in the Buildings of England series state that the church is a "simple, straightforward building, and already archaeologically accurate".

== Present day ==
St Mary's is an active Roman Catholic parish church in the diocese of Liverpool. Masses and other services are held in the church on Sundays and during the week.

== See also ==
- Listed buildings in Little Crosby
