= Burscough =

Town in West Lancashire, England

Coordinates: 53.596°N 2.843°W

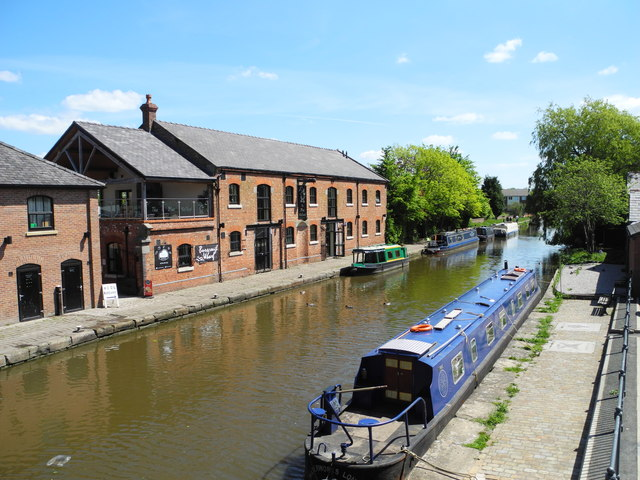
- The Leeds and Liverpool Canal at Burscough Bridge

- Shown within West Lancashire Location within Lancashire
- Population: 9,935 (2021 Census)
- OS grid reference: SD444118
- Civil parish: Burscough
- District: West Lancashire
- Shire county: Lancashire
- Region: North West
- Country: England
- Sovereign state: United Kingdom
- Post town: ORMSKIRK
- Postcode district: L40
- Dialling code: 01704
- Police: Lancashire
- Fire: Lancashire
- Ambulance: North West
- UK Parliament: West Lancashire
- Website: https://burscoughparishcouncil.org

Burscough (/ˈbɜːrskoʊ, -skə/) is a town and civil parish in the West Lancashire district of Lancashire, England. The town is located approximately 14 miles (23 km) north-northeast of Liverpool and 13 miles (21 km) southwest of Preston. Its northern part is called Burscough Bridge, and was originally a separate settlement.

The parish includes the hamlets of New Lane and Tarlscough and the Martin Mere Wetland Centre. The recorded population of the parish in the 2021 Census was 9,935, an increase from 9,182 at the 2011 Census.

== History and growth ==
The remains of a substantial Roman fort are located at Burscough; it has an area of 30,000 m^{2} and was begun in 1st century. The fort was linked to the nearby forts at Wigan and Ribchester, and is significant as Roman sites are rare in the west of Lancashire. It is a scheduled monument.

Burscough developed later as a small farming village on a low ridge above the West Lancashire Coastal Plain, and has Viking roots – Burh-skogr = fortress in the woods. Of early importance to the village was Burscough Priory, the ruins of which stand to the southwest of the current settlement. The priory formerly housed the tombs of some of the Stanley family, earls of Derby, which are now to be found in Ormskirk parish church.

With the building of the Leeds and Liverpool Canal and the coming of the railways in the mid-18th century new developments took place north of the original village, in what came to be called Burscough Bridge, though the two communities have long since melded together.

For over a hundred years (from c. 1892) there was an Ordnance Depot on the eastern edge of Burscough, but this closed in 1996 and the site has been redeveloped into housing.

== Administration ==
Burscough is within the West Lancashire constituency of the Parliament of the United Kingdom, and is currently represented by Ashley Dalton of the Labour Party.

Lancashire is a two-tier county, meaning Burscough is governed by both a county council and a borough council. The town is part of the Burscough & Rufford electoral division of Lancashire County Council, currently represented by Eddie Pope of the Conservative Party. Burscough is split between the wards of Burscough Town and Burscough Bridge & Rufford on West Lancashire Borough Council.

The civil parish of Burscough is governed by Burscough Town Council, which has up to fourteen councillors.

== RNAS Burscough (HMS Ringtail) ==
There was an operational Fleet Air Arm air station, RNAS Burscough (HMS Ringtail), 1.5 miles (2.4 km) southwest of the town. It was active between September 1943 and May 1946.

== Community ==
=== Schools ===
Burscough has a number of primary schools:

- Lordsgate Township C of E
- St. John's Church of England
- Burscough Village (formerly Colburne Close Primary)
- Burscough Bridge Methodist
- St. John's Roman Catholic

There is also a secondary school, Burscough Priory Academy (formerly Burscough Priory High School and Burscough Priory Science College) and also a small public library.

=== Retail and commercial ===
Shopping in the town is provided for by a large Tesco supermarket, a Booths, an Aldi and some other smaller shops including a Spar, as well as local florists, barber. Burscough Wharf provides a space for small independent businesses, alongside the artisan market.

==== Burscough Wharf ====
On 12 February 2011, a small retail and leisure development known as Burscough Wharf opened its doors to the public. Situated on the Leeds and Liverpool Canal, next to the southern bridge of the town centre, the development consists of approximately thirty units available for retail, leisure or office/studio space. Current businesses operating within the central square of Burscough Wharf consist of an instrumental music school, various independent gift shops, food and drink outlets, including a burger restaurant, gin bar and tea room, and health and beauty salons, and a fortnightly artisan market has been established.

=== Churches ===
Burscough has three churches: St John the Baptist Church, St John the Evangelist Roman Catholic Church and Burscough Methodist Church.

== Transport ==
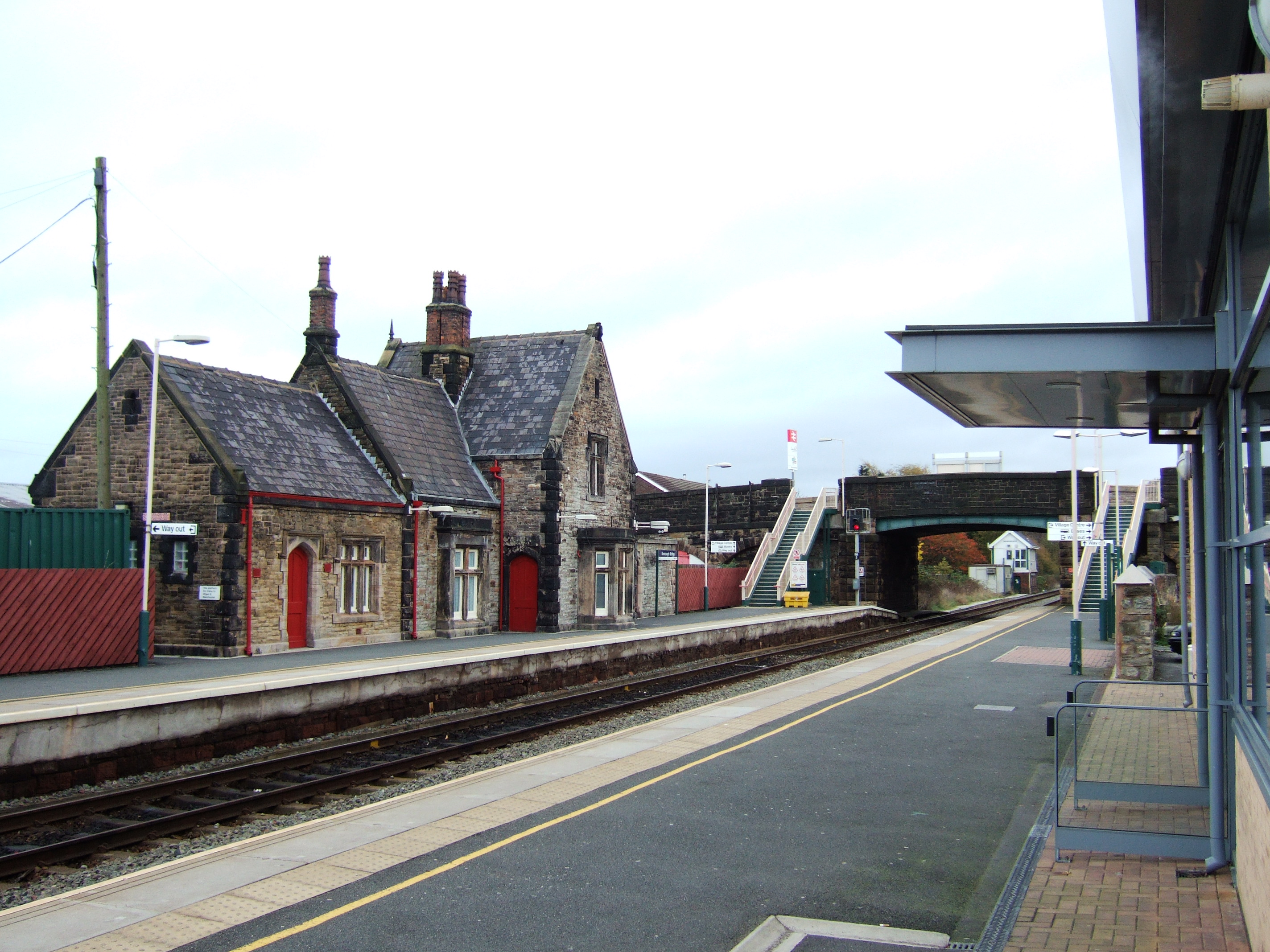
Burscough Bridge railway station

The A59 trunk road and Leeds and Liverpool Canal pass through Burscough and the A5209 brings large volumes of traffic through the town from where it connects to the A59. Lancashire County Council describe the town as suffering from "severe congestion". The canal junction with the Rufford Branch of the Leeds and Liverpool Canal is in Burscough. The town has two main railway stations: Burscough Junction, on the Liverpool to Preston line, was opened by the East Lancashire Railway on 2 April 1849, though the line now terminates at Ormskirk. Burscough Bridge, on the Southport to Manchester line, was opened by the Lancashire & Yorkshire Railway on 9 April 1855. There is also a third station two miles from the centre in New Lane, which is a small halt on the same line as Burscough Bridge. These lines formerly had a junction known as the Burscough curves. The removal of the curves prevents through train services between Ormskirk and Southport and Southport and Preston. The Burscough Junction Station Crash occurred on 15 January 1880 on the Liverpool to Preston railway line.

On 29 August 2026, a train collided with a van on the level crossing at Burscough, killing the driver.

=== Victor Electrics ===
Burscough Bridge was the home of Victor Electrics, a manufacturer of battery electric road vehicles, including bread vans and milk floats. The company was formed by Outram's bakery of Southport, who could not find electric vehicles at a price they were prepared to pay, and so decided to build their own. The first bread van was produced in 1923, and proved so successful that several more were built. By 1927, the company looked at the possibility of allowing another company, who were already involved in electric vehicle production, to take over the enterprise, but they decided to retain control of the facility. The company was based on Victoria Street, just to the north of the Leeds and Liverpool Canal, where there was a bakery shown on maps from 1928, and engineering works on the 1972 map.

Initial models looked like a conventional van, with a bonnet at the front, which housed the batteries, but they made their first forward control model in 1931, and switched completely to this design, which became ubiquitous for milk floats, in 1935. Although they set up another company, Ross Auto Engineering, to manufacture battery electric vehicles in 1949, production of their own models continued at Burscough Bridge. They were taken over by Brook Motors, becoming Brook Victor Electric Vehicles in 1967. Acquired by Hawker Siddeley in 1970, they became Brook Crompton Parkinson Motors in 1973. One Victor milk float still exists. It is a B20 model dating from around 1955, and is currently awaiting restoration at the Transport Museum, Wythall, to the south of Birmingham.

=== Windmill Farm Railway ===
The Windmill Farm Railway is a narrow gauge railway line located at the Windmill Animal Farm. The railway operates over a 1.1-mile (2 km) track at 15 in (381 mm) gauge, using locomotives previously from the Fairbourne Railway, since that line has regauged to a smaller gauge.

== Sport and leisure ==
=== Burscough F.C. ===
Burscough F.C. play at New Victoria Park, having moved from the now demolished Victoria Park in 2020. They won the FA Trophy in 2003 when they defeated conference side Tamworth in the final at Villa Park. In the 2005-06 FA Cup competition they beat league side Gillingham 3–2 at home in the first round. After winning the Northern Premier League in 2007, they were then relegated from the Conference North to the NPL Premier Division in the 2008–09 season. Two further relegations followed and the club now play in the North West Counties League Premier Division.

=== Allotment society ===
Although the allotments in Burscough have been used since the construction of the Richmond Avenue housing estate, the need for a formal society was identified by the Parish Council in order to obtain further land for allotments in Burscough. Following a series of meetings a society was formed and the constitution agreed during a meeting on 23 November 2011.

=== Fishing ===
There is a fishery in the town at Warper's Moss Lane, which has four-man-made lakes stocked with a wide variety of coarse fish including carp to around 20 pounds (9.1 kg). Fishing is available on a day ticket.

== Martin Mere ==
Martin Mere is a large wildfowl reserve and visitor attraction on the edge of Burscough and is owned by the Wildfowl and Wetlands Trust. In 2006 Martin Mere featured in the BBC television programme Autumnwatch.

== Gallery ==
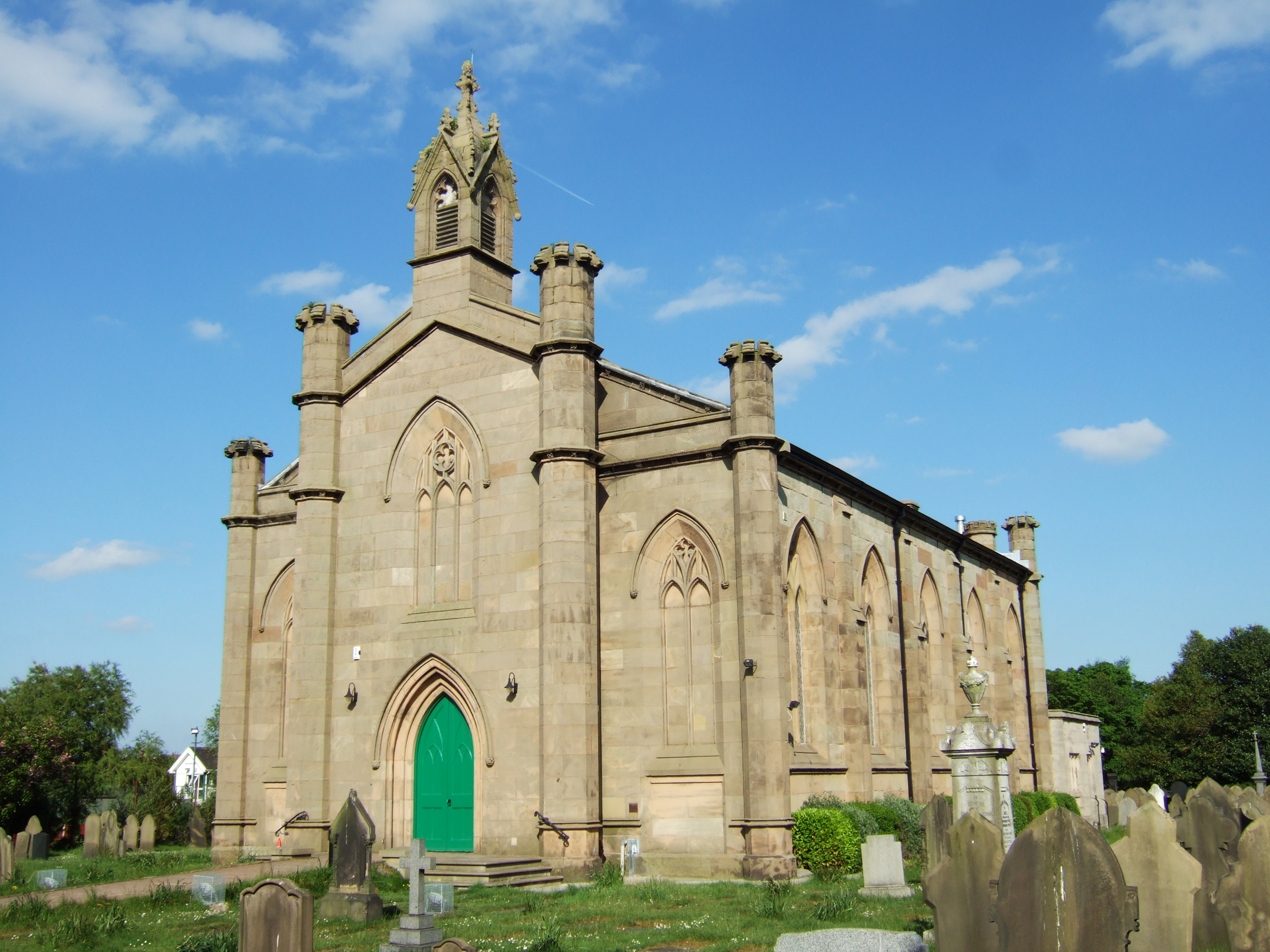
Burscough Parish Church

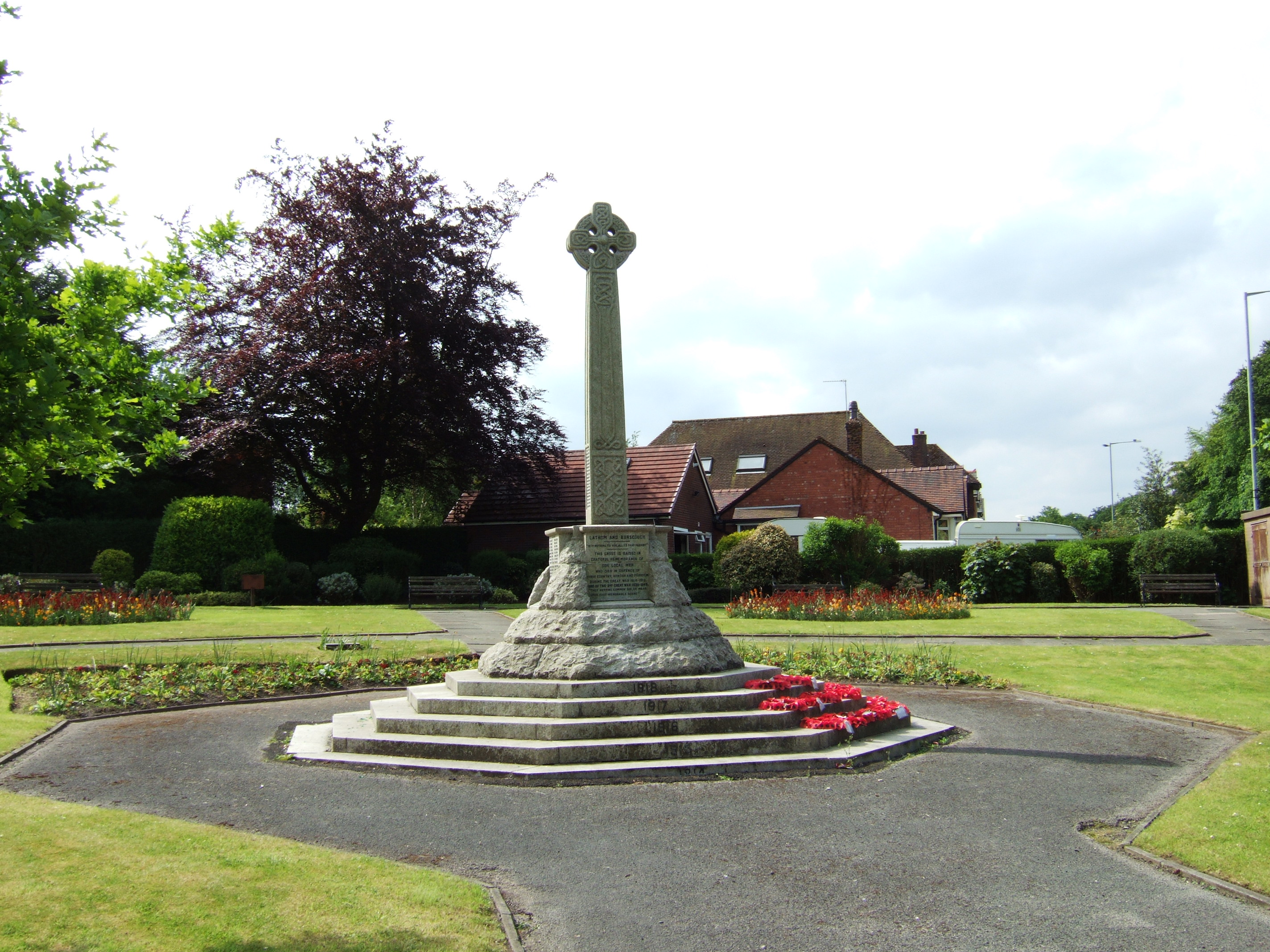
Lathom and Burscough War Memorial

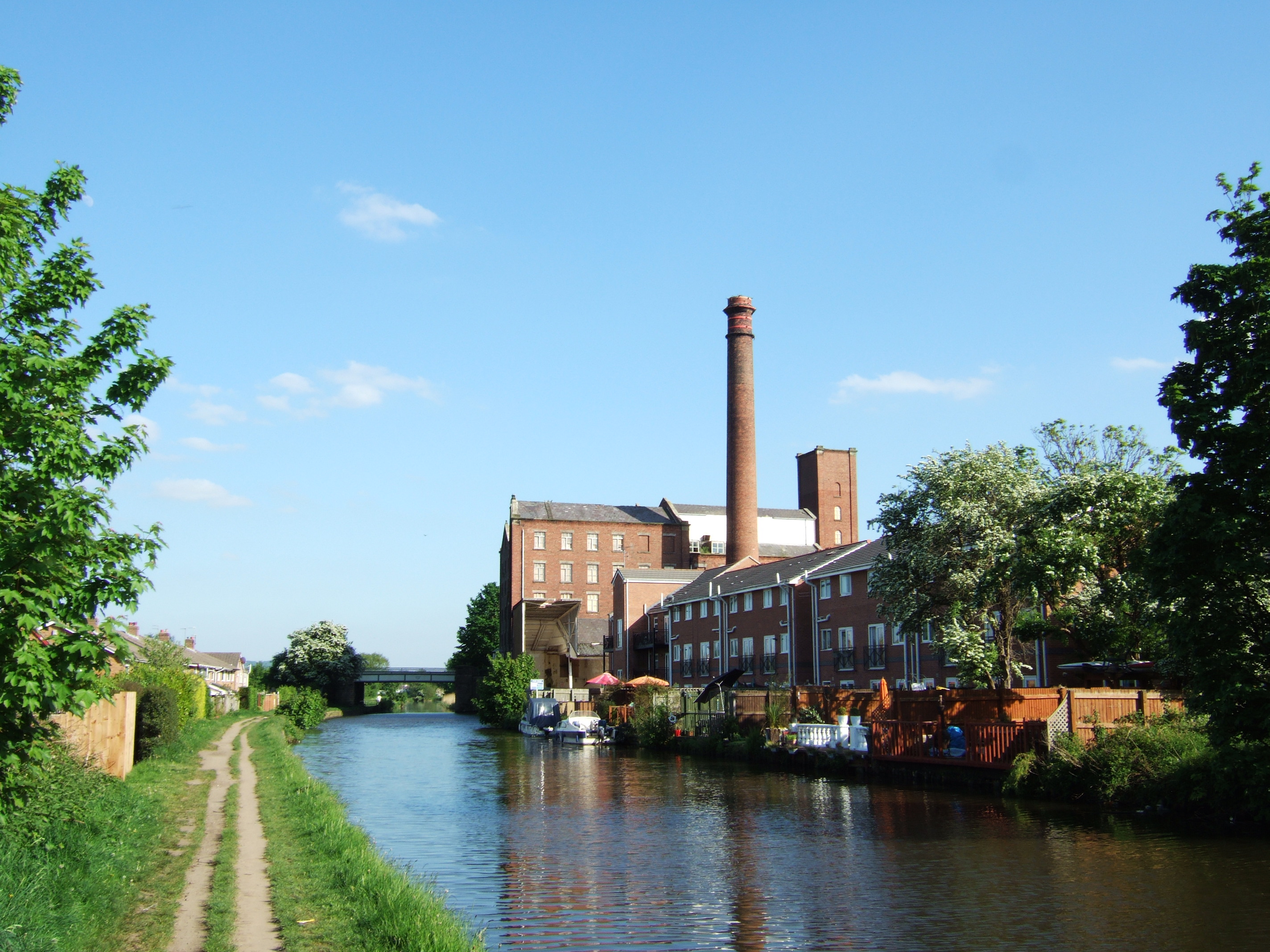
Ainscough Flour Mill on the Leeds and Liverpool Canal

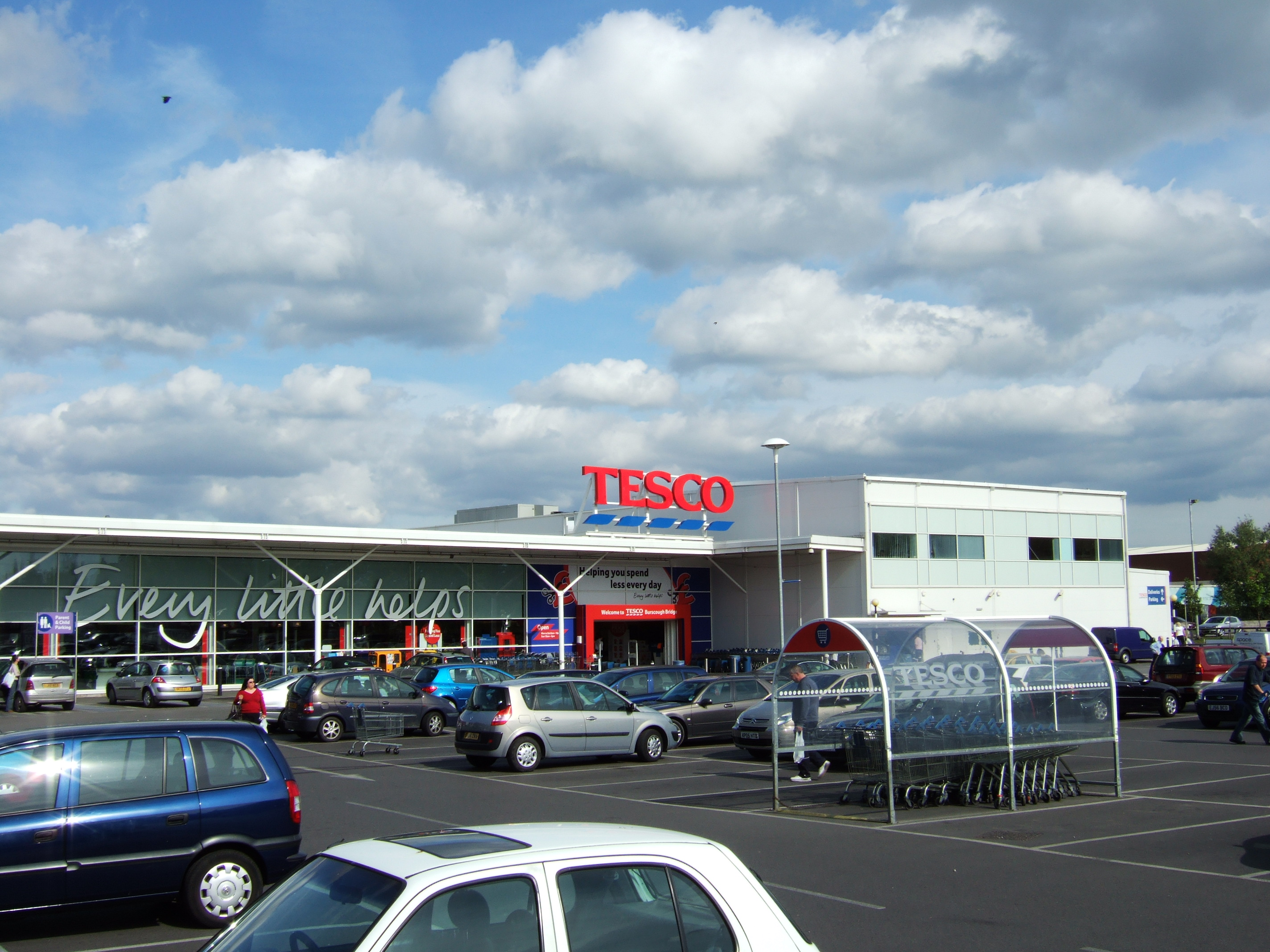
Tesco supermarket in Burscough

== Notable people ==
- Bobby Langton (1918–1996), footballer who played mostly for Lancashire clubs, playing 429 games and 11 for England
- Colin Sephton (born 1945), sports shooter, competed at the 1968 & 1972 Summer Olympics
- Iain Coyle (born 1968), a TV presenter, producer and comedian.
- Mark Beesley (born 1980), footballer who played over 280 games, currently manager of F.C. United of Manchester

== See also ==
- Listed buildings in Burscough
- Lathom and Burscough Urban District
