= Listed buildings in Little Crosby =

Little Crosby is a village to the north of Great Crosby in Sefton, Merseyside, England. It contains 29 buildings that are recorded in the National Heritage List for England as designated listed buildings. Of these, one is listed at Grade II*, the middle of the three grades, and the others are at Grade II, the lowest grade. The most important building in the village is Crosby Hall.

The hall and its outbuildings, some of which have been converted for use by the Crosby Hall Educational Trust, and other structures associated with the hall, are included in the list. Most of the other listed buildings are houses in the main street of the village, together with a church, a presbytery and convent, and a medieval cross.

== Key ==
Grade	Criteria
II*	Particularly important buildings of more than special interest
II	Buildings of national importance and special interest

== Buildings ==
Name and location	Photograph	Date	Notes	Grade
Medieval cross 53.50316°N 3.02544°W	—	Late medieval (probable)	The cross is in sandstone. It has a base of two steps, with a cuboid plinth, and an octagonal shaft with a chamfered cap and the stump of a finial.	II
Crosby Hall Educational Trust; 53.50645°N 3.02227°W	—	16th century (probable)	The buildings for the Trust were developed from the outbuildings of Crosby Hall in 1989–91. These form an L-shaped plan, and include the former barn, which was originally timber-framed and later clad in stone, the sandstone coach house and stable range from the late 18th or early 19th century, and a 19th-century polygonal gin house.	II
Village Farmhouse; 53.50506°N 3.02827°W	—	1669	A house and store developed from a farmhouse, cottage and barn, the last dating probably from the 18th century. The house is in sandstone, the barn in brick, and both have stone-slate roofs. The building is in two storeys, the oldest part having a Tudor arched doorway with a dated lintel, and mullioned windows. Elsewhere there are later inserted windows.	II
11 Little Crosby Road; 53.50421°N 3.02712°W	—	Late 17th century	A stone cottage with a slate roof, in two storeys and with a two-bay front. To the left is a square-headed doorway, and to the right are three-light casement windows in each storey. Inside the cottage is an inglenook.	II
18 and 20 Little Crosby Road; 53.50510°N 3.02787°W		Late 17th century	Originally a farmhouse and a cottage, the buildings is in sandstone and brick, and has a stone-slate roof. It is in two storeys with a three-bay front. In the front are paired doorways, one of which is blocked, and mullioned windows. Inside there are two cruck frames.	II
Model Farm; 53.50431°N 3.02718°W	Model_Farm,_Little_Crosby Model_Farmhouse,_Little_Crosby	Late 17th century	A farmhouse at Nos. 13 and 13A Little Crosby Road, originally two dwellings, later combined. Both are in two storeys with slate roofs. No 13 was rebuilt in the late 18th century, it is in stone and has a single-bay front. There are casement windows on each floor. No. 13A is dated 1857, it is brick with stone dressings, and a near-symmetrical two-bay front. On the front is a gabled porch, mullioned windows, and the initials "N.B" in yellow brick headers.	II
15 and 17 Little Crosby Road; 53.50462°N 3.02754°W		Late 17th or early 18th century	A farmhouse and attached cottage in brick on a stone plinth with a stone-slate roof. The building is in 1 1/2 storeys with a three-bay front. On the front is a gabled porch, casement windows, and three half-dormers with hipped roofs. The doorway to No. 17 is on the right side.	II
24 and 26 Little Crosby Road; 53.50541°N 3.02822°W	24_&_26_Little_Crosby_Road	Early 18th century (probable)	A pair of sandstone cottages with slate roofs in two storeys. On the front are two three-light casement windows in each floor. The doorway to No. 24 is on the right side, and that to No. 26 is on the front.	II
Heatherlea Farmhouse and barn 53.50489°N 3.02744°W	Heatherlea_Farmhouse,_Little_Crosby	Early 18th century	The house is in brick and the barn in sandstone; both have slate roofs. The house has two storeys with an attic, and a three-bay front. On the front are a doorway and casement windows, all with segmental heads. The barn is in a single storey with windows and ventilations slits on the front, and a wagon doorway in the rear.	II
Presbytery and convent, St Mary's Church; 53.50770°N 3.02681°W	Convent_and_presbytery_of_St_Mary's,_Little_Crosby	Early 18th century (probable)	The presbytery and the convent (which originated as a chapel) were remodelled in the mid 19th century. Both are in Tudor style and built in brick, the presbytery is stuccoed with a slate roof, and the convent has sandstone dressings and a stone-slate roof. The presbytery is in two storeys and two bays with a two-storey bay window. The convent is also in two storeys and has a two-storey gabled former porch in the centre.	II
5 and 7 Little Crosby Road; 53.50395°N 3.02677°W	—	Early to mid 18th century (probable)	A pair of brick houses with a rendered right gable and a slate roof. They are in two storeys and each house has a two-bay front. The doorway to No. 5 is to the right, and that of No. 7 is in the centre. The windows are casements.	II
1 and 3 Little Crosby Road; 53.50386°N 3.02664°W		18th century (probable)	No. 1 is a former smithy, and No. 3 is a house added later. The smithy is in stone with a stone-slate roof, in a single storey and with a two-bay front containing a wagon doorway and a square window. The house has a datestone with 1713 inscription and is in sandstone with a slate roof, in two storeys and two bays. It has a square-headed doorway and casement windows.	II
9 Little Crosby Road; 53.50416°N 3.02707°W	—	Mid 18th century (probable)	A brick cottage with a slate roof in two storeys with a single-bay front. To the right is a square-headed doorway, and to the left is a three-light casement window in each storey.	II
Cross, Crosby Hall; 53.50299°N 3.02570°W	—	18th century (probable)	This consists of a rectangular slab of sandstone with a raised cross, which is set into the boundary wall of the hall. It purpose is unknown.	II
Cross and well 53.50574°N 3.02892°W		1758	The well has been filled in. The cross is in sandstone and is set on a square plinth. The shaft is chamfered, and the head dates from the 19th century. The site of the former well is surrounded by a three-sided wall.	II
Former farm buildings, Crosby Hall; 53.50681°N 3.02239°W	—	Late 18th century (probable)	The farm buildings have been converted for use by an educational trust. They are in sandstone with slate roofs and ridge tiles. The buildings form an L-shaped plan. They contain doorways, including two wagon doorways, and windows.	II
Crosby Hall; 53.50566°N 3.02287°W		1784–86	A country house rebuilt on the site of earlier houses. It was later enlarged, but reduced again in the 1950s. The house is in sandstone, and has a green slate roof. There are three storeys, and an almost-symmetrical front of five bays. Features include corner turrets, a central pediment, a Venetian window, a Diocletian window. On the front is an Ionic four-columned portico, which was moved from Claughton Hall, Garstang, Lancashire in about 1955.	II*
Outbuilding, Heatherlea Farm; 53.50465°N 3.02722°W	—	c. 1800 or earlier	The outbuilding is in sandstone with Welsh slate roofs and substantial quoins. On the front facing the street are evenly-spaced ventilation slits, but no other openings.	II
2 and 4 Little Crosby Road; 53.50566°N 3.02287°W		Early 19th century (probable)	A pair of brick cottages with stone-slate roofs, and with a stone lean-to at the left end. They are in two storeys and each cottage has two-bays. No. 2 has a square-headed doorway with a stone lintel and rectangular windows, and No. 4 has segmental-headed openings.	II
Cart shed, Crosby Hall; 53.50677°N 3.02300°W	—	Early to mid 19th century (probable)	The former cart shed has been converted into use as a garage and store. It is in sandstone, and has a slate roof with ridge tiles. It has a long rectangular plan, is in a single storey, and has an open four-bay front with cylindrical piers. There are screen walls at the ends.	II
Cottage, Crosby Hall; 53.50661°N 3.02300°W	—	Early to mid 19th century (probable)	Probably originating as a coach house and later converted into a cottage, it is in stone with a slate roof and has a rectangular plan. The building is in a single storey and has a gabled front containing a coach entrance, now filled in. It is linked by a screen wall to the former cart shed.	II
Garden walls, Crosby Hall; 53.50578°N 3.02427°W	—	Early to mid 19th century (probable)	The walls are in brick and sandstone and have sandstone coping. They form the north, east and south sides of a former walled garden. Their height varies between 1.8 metres (5.9 ft) and 3 metres (9.8 ft).	II
Gate piers and walls, Liverpool Lodge; 53.50214°N 3.02492°W		Early to mid 19th century (probable)	The gate piers flank the southern entrance to Crosby Hall. Outside these are screen walls ending in piers. The piers and walls are in sandstone, and the piers are rusticated. The central piers have a cornice at the top, surmounted by a metal rampant lion with a hammer; the outer piers have pyramidal caps.	II
Ormskirk Lodge, Crosby Hall; 53.50329°N 3.01428°W		Early to mid 19th century (probable)	The entrance lodge is in sandstone with a slate roof, and is in Tudor style. It is in a single storey, and has an asymmetrical plan. Its features include a gabled porch, a shield above a Tudor arched doorway, mullioned windows, and a canted bay window.	II
St Mary's Church; 53.50766°N 3.02748°W		1845–47	A Roman Catholic church by Weightman and Hadfield in Decorated style. It is built in sandstone with slate roofs, and consists of a nave with aisles, a chancel with a south chapel forming a transept, a north porch and offices on the north side, and a west steeple. The steeple consists of a three-stage tower with a broach spire. In the chapel are memorials to members of the Blundell family of Crosby Hall.	II
Liverpool Lodge, Crosby Hall; 53.50227°N 3.02494°W	—	Mid 19th century (probable)	The entrance lodge is in sandstone with a hipped slate roof, and is in Classical style. The lodge is in a single storey, and is symmetrical with an almost-cruciform plan. It has a porch with open arches, and the windows are sashes.	II
Walls and piers, Ormskirk Lodge; 53.50315°N 3.01431°W	—	Mid 19th century (probable)	These consist of a pair of gate piers, with walls linking to terminal piers. They are in stone, the piers consisting of square monoliths on plinths, with plain cornices and flat tops.	II
Dutch barn, Crosby Hall; 53.50655°N 3.02166°W	—	Late 19th century (probable)	Originally a hay barn, later used as a store, it is in red brick with a hipped slate roof and red ridge tiles. The building has a rectangular plan, and is in five bays with rectangular brick piers.	II
Stone archway, Crosby Hall; 53.50545°N 3.02159°W	—	Late 19th or early 20th century (probable)	The archway is in rustic style over a garden path. It is constructed from roughly hewn boulders forming a wide segmental arch, with five projections giving the appearance of finials.	II

== See also ==
- Grade I listed buildings in Merseyside
- Grade II* listed buildings in Merseyside
