= Burscough Roman fort =

First century fort in Burscough, UK

- Location within Lancashire
- 53.591°N 2.837°W
- Location: Lancashire, England, United Kingdom

History
- Founded: c.1st century AD
- Built: Claudius

Site notes
- Discovered: 2014
- Condition: Earthworks

Burscough Roman Fort was a c.1st century AD auxiliary fort near what is now Burscough, West Lancashire, England.

Archaeological excavations are ongoing, and the site has been described as "the most significant Roman discovery made in Lancashire for over 100 years".

== Description ==
The site of the fort has an area of 30,000m² and was built in at least two phases. An initial sandstone auxiliary fort oriented north to south and measuring 160 metres in length with a shallow rampart was constructed in the first century AD during the Roman conquest of Britain. A second site constructed over the eastern rampart suggests the presence of a later, smaller fortlet.

Several internal structures have been identified through geophysical survey including an eastern gateway with two gate towers, and multiple sandstone buildings which have been identified as granaries or barracks. Beam slots and hearths have also been identified, suggesting some industrial usage.

== History ==
While the exact age and name of the fort are not yet known, it is believed to have been built during the Roman conquest of Britain in the first century AD, likely during the reign of Claudius.

An initial auxiliary fort was built with a later fortlet built on its eastern side.

The site was inhabited at various intervals until at least the mid-4th century AD, owing to the multiple ditches identified at the site. It has been suggested that there was a possible hiatus in the habitation of the site c.3nd century AD.

== Archaeology ==
It is possible that the site was referenced in the diaries of Nicholas Blundell on 28 September 1721, when he noted "a place in [Francis Farrer's] ground where 'tis supposed there formerly stood a small Castle". The site was identified in the Tithe map of 1846 as 'Castle Field', likely with reference to its history as a former Roman fort. Subsoiling activities in 2003 during construction work and field walking in 2005 suggested the presence of a large sandstone structure.

In 2013, the stratigraphy of the site was investigated, revealing a complex history of multiple phases of inhabitation and further archaeological evaluation of the site in 2014 and 2015 revealed the presence of a fort, including a buttressed structure resembling granaries found at other Roman forts in Britain.

In 2018, the presence of a fort of at least two phases was confirmed by an electrical resistance survey, and in 2020 an assessment by Historic England using Google Maps and Lidar imagery showed that the fort was visible as crop marks, soil marks and earthworks.

The site was given scheduled monument status by the Secretary of State for Digital, Culture, Media and Sport status in 2020.

== See also ==
- Castra
