= Nicholas Blundell =

British writer (1669–1737)

Blundell Arms (blazoned) : Sable, ten Billets, 4, 3, 2 and 1, Argent

Nicholas Blundell (1669–1737), sometimes styled "of Crosby", lord of the manor of Great and Little Crosby, was an English landowner seated at Crosby Hall, Lancashire, and is best known for his diaries which provide first-hand insight into the life of 18th-century English gentry.

== Family ==
Devoutly Catholic since the Middle Ages, the Blundells were among the leading recusant families prior to Catholic Emancipation in the 19th century, and progenitors of various cadet branches including the Weld-Blundell family.

== Life ==
Born in Lancashire, his father William Blundell (1645–1702) who married Mary Eyre (died 1707), was the eldest son and heir of William Blundell "the Cavalier" (Knight of Malta), for his exploits during the English Civil War. Nicholas Blundell's notebook was first published in 1880 by the Revd. T. E. Gibson A Cavalier’s Note Book and was referenced by Lady Antonia Fraser in her work on English 17th-century women, The Weaker Vessel (Phoenix Press, London, 2002 paperback, originally published 1984).

The year after his father's death, Nicholas Blundell married the Hon. Frances Langdale having two daughters, the younger of whom Frances (Mrs Henry Peppard, 1706–1773) succeeded to the ancestral estates upon assuming by Royal Licence in 1772 the surname and arms of Blundell.

Blundell's descendants remain seated at Crosby Hall, now in Merseyside.

== Sources ==
Three volumes of Blundell's Diaries were produced by Frank Tyrer and J. J. Bagley and published by the Record Society of Lancashire & Cheshire between 1968 and 1972.

- The great diurnal of Nicholas Blundell volume 1 : 1702-1711 (1968)
- The great diurnal of Nicholas Blundell volume 2 : 1712-1719 (1970)
- The great diurnal of Nicholas Blundell volume 3 : 1720-1728 (1972)
- A volume Blundell’s diary & letter book 1702-1728 was published in 1952, edited by Margaret Blundell (Liverpool University Press, Liverpool, 1952).
- A secondary source is J. J. Bagley, Historical importance of Nicholas Blundell's diurnal, 1972.

== See also ==
- Crosby Hall
- Catholic Record Society

== Bibliography ==
- Crosby, Alan G. (2004). "Blundell, Nicholas (1669–1737)". In Oxford Dictionary of National Biography. Oxford: Oxford UP, n.p.
