= Leyland Hundred =

Hundred of Leyland
- Lancashire Hundred

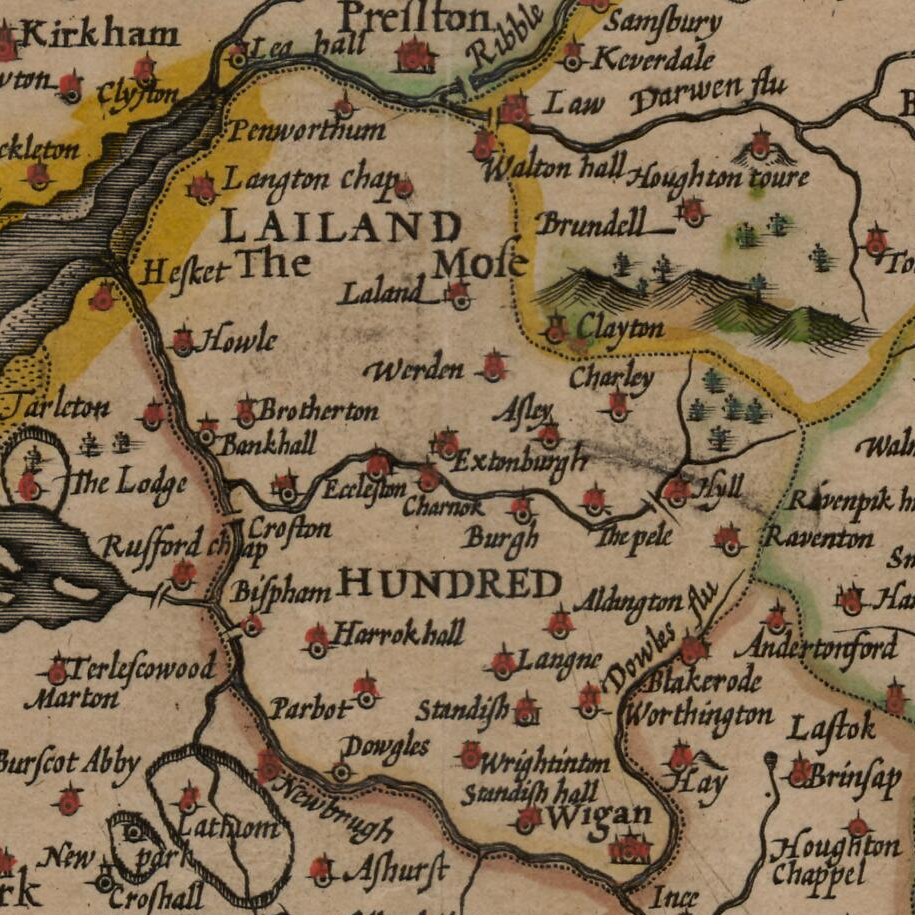
- Leyland Hundred depicted in John Speed's 1610 map of Lancashire
- Area
  - 1831: 79,990 acres (324 km^{2})
  - Coordinates: 53.686°N 2.657°W
- History
  - Created: Before Domesday
  - Abolished: Mid-18th century, never formally abolished
- Status: Ancient Hundred
  - HQ: Eccleston
- Subdivisions
  - Type: Parish(es)
  - Units: Leyland • Penwortham • Brindle • Croston • Hesketh-With-Becconsall • Tarleton • Rufford • Chorley • Hoole • Eccleston • Standish

Hundreds of Lancashire

The Leyland Hundred (also known as Leylandshire) was a subdivision the historic county of Lancashire in England. It covered the parishes of Brindle, Chorley, Croston, Eccleston, Hoole, Leyland, Penwortham, Rufford, Standish and Tarleton.

In the Domesday Book the area was recorded as 'Lailand' Hundred, included in the returns for Cheshire. However, it cannot be said clearly to have been part of Cheshire.

== Bibliography ==
- Crosby, A. (1996). A History of Cheshire. (The Darwen County History Series.) Chichester, West Sussex, UK: Phillimore & Co. Ltd. ISBN 0850339324.
- Harris, B. E., and Thacker, A. T. (1987). The Victoria History of the County of Chester. (Volume 1: Physique, Prehistory, Roman, Anglo-Saxon, and Domesday). Oxford: Oxford University Press. ISBN 0197227619.
- Morgan, P. (1978). Domesday Book Cheshire: Including Lancashire, Cumbria, and North Wales. Chichester, Sussex: Phillimore & Co. Ltd. ISBN 0850331404.
- Phillips A. D. M., and Phillips, C. B. (2002), A New Historical Atlas of Cheshire. Chester, UK: Cheshire County Council and Cheshire Community Council Publications Trust. ISBN 0904532461.
