= Sephton =

Sephton is a surname. Notable people with the surname include:

- Alfred Edward Sephton (1911–1941), British Royal Navy sailor and Victoria Cross recipient
- Arthur Sephton (1894-1982), British Anglican priest
- Colin Sephton (born 1945), British sport shooter
- Henry Sephton (c. 1686–1756), English architect
