= Crosby Hall, Merseyside =

Listed building near Liverpool, England

Crosby Hall
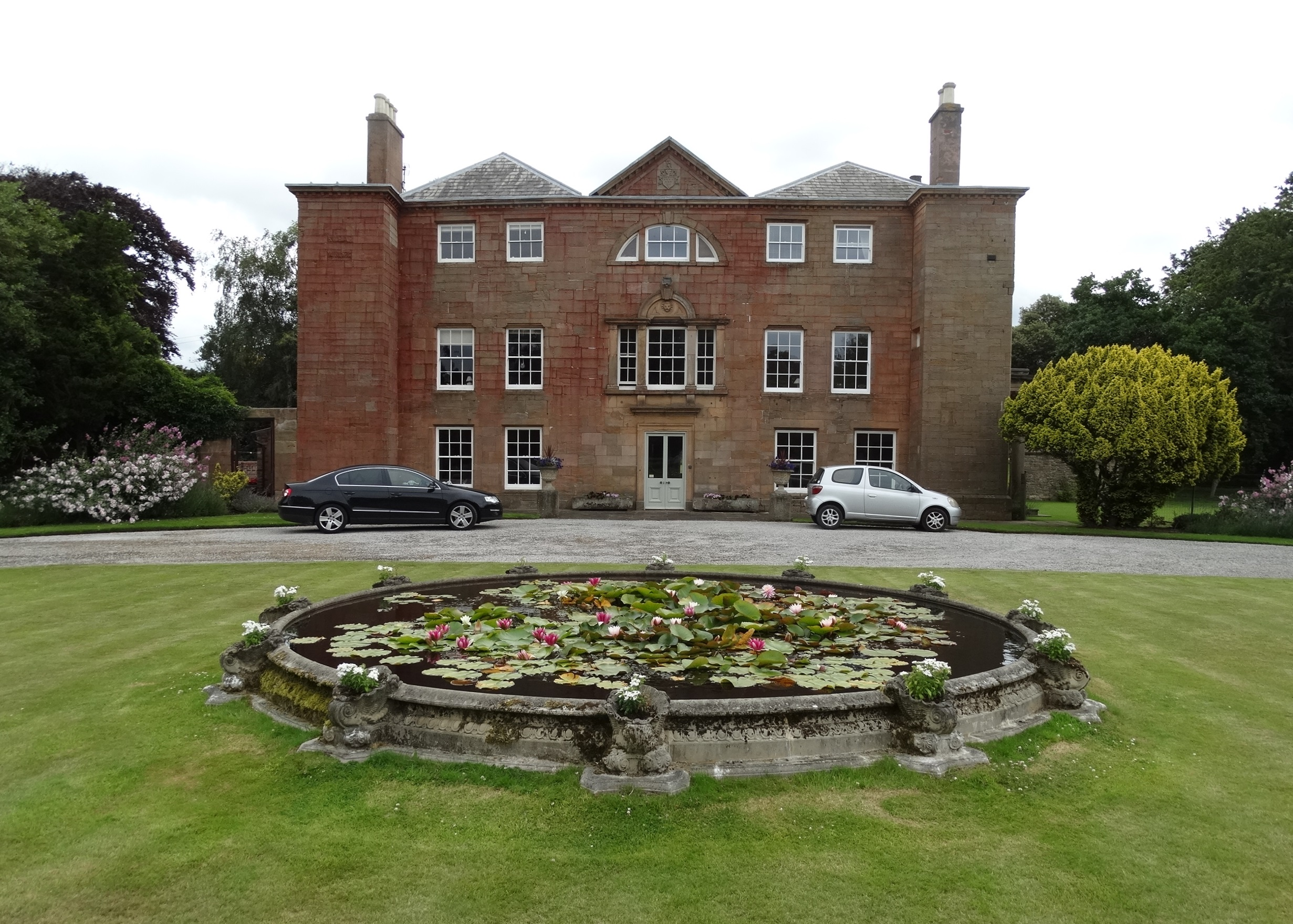
- The Hall in 2014

- Location in Merseyside

General information
- Location: Crosby, Merseyside, England
- Coordinates: 53°30′24″N 3°1′20″W
- Year built: 16th century
- Renovated: 1786 (rebuilt)
- Owner: Mark Blundell

Design and construction
- Designations

Listed Building – Grade II*
- Official name: Crosby Hall
- Designated: 9 June 1952
- Reference no.: 1257734

Website
- www.chetcentre.org.uk

Crosby Hall is a manor house situated in the ancient manor of Little Crosby, historically in Lancashire and since 1974 in Merseyside. Near the city of Liverpool and located in the Metropolitan Borough of Sefton, it is a Grade II* listed building.

The Hall was rebuilt just after the American Revolutionary War in the Georgian style, for Nicholas Blundell (né Peppard, 1740–1795), replacing the previous Elizabethan manor house, some of which still remains. Almost square in layout, Crosby Hall comprises three-storeys built in sandstone ashlar with a 3-span hipped roof of green slate.

== History ==
Blundell arms

The Blundells, lords of the manors of Great Crosby, Little Crosby and a moiety of Ditton, have been seated at Crosby Hall since the Middle Ages, becoming one of the leading Lancashire recusant landed gentry families.

Staunch Catholics persecuted for recusancy, the Blundells retained the village of Crosby, largely unchanged since the 17th century, when described as having "not a beggar, ... an alehouse ... [or] a Protestant in it...", until the 20th century.

The Blundells of Crosby's numerous cadet offspring mostly became déclassé after converting to Anglicism following the Reformation, with the notable exceptions of Viscount Blundell and the Blundells of Ince, progenitor of the Weld-Blundell family and Cardinal Weld.

=== Blundell family ===
In 1590 devoutly Catholic Richard Blundell was imprisoned in Chester Castle for "harbouring a seminary priest" dying at Lancaster Gaol in 1592. His son William Blundell (1567–1638) and daughter-in-law Emily née Norris (1566–1631) were imprisoned for the same offence in the Gatehouse Prison at Westminster until 1595, and afterwards remained in hiding until purchasing a free pardon from King James I. Their eldest son, Nicholas Blundell (1589–1631) "who was born or at least suckled in prison" also staunchly adhered to Papism marrying Jane Bradshaigh, but predeceased his father.

The family remained Royalists during the Civil War, when the next squire William Blundell (1620–1698) was severely injured during the siege of Lancaster Castle, being jailed and his family estates confiscated for ten years.

The diarist Nicholas Blundell, who married Frances Langdale, was the family's last senior male-line representative and is buried in the Blundell Chapel at St Helen's Church, Sefton. He was succeeded in the family estates by their younger daughter, Frances Blundell (1706–1773) who married Henry Peppard (died 1771), a grandson of Thomas Peppard, MP for Drogheda (also ancestor of George Peppard). Nicholas Peppard (1740–1795), their eldest surviving son, in 1772 assumed by Royal Licence the surname and arms of Blundell.

After Catholic Emancipation in the 19th century, William Blundell (1786–1854) served as High Sheriff of Lancashire (for 1838/39), whose descendants variously became nuns or Knights of Malta, including Captain Francis Blundell MP.

Mark Blundell is the present head of the family and served as Lord-Lieutenant of Merseyside between 2017 and 2025.

== Modern use ==
Crosby Hall lies in an 120-acre (49 ha) estate and is home to the Crosby Hall Education Trust (CHET). A registered charity founded in 1988, CHET was opened by Princess Margaret on 8 May 1991, offering outdoor activity to various youth groups, as well as corporate initiatives such as weddings and conferences.

== See also ==
- Blundellsands
- Grade II* listed buildings in Merseyside
- Listed buildings in Little Crosby
