= Colin Sephton =

British sports shooter

Personal information
- Born: 10 July 1945 (age 80) Burscough, Lancashire, England

Sport
- Sport: Sports shooting

Colin Sephton (born 10 July 1945) is a British former sports shooter. He competed at the 1968 Summer Olympics and the 1972 Summer Olympics.
