= Average worker's wage =

Labour benchmark

Average wage is the mean salary of a group of workers. This measure is often monitored and used by government or other organisations as a benchmark for the wage level of individual workers in an industry, area or country.

The usefulness of this measure in assessing wage levels is debatable, particularly in an economy where low pay is prevalent, due to the tendency for the wages of a minority of high earners to 'skew' the average upwards. It has been argued that the median (midpoint) worker's wage is a better indicator in these circumstances; this measure is used in the UK by both the Office for National Statistics and the Scottish Low Pay Unit in examining wage levels.

Certain UK organisations, usually socialist or left-of-centre political groups, have traditionally had a policy that members should never accept wages higher than the wage of the average working class person whilst being employed by that organisation or in a representative capacity. Deputies and officials paid an average worker's wage are also a feature of the Dictatorship of the Proletariat described in Marx's account of the Paris Commune, The Civil War in France, as well as in Lenin's The State and Revolution commentary on Marx's pamphlet, although not all people who draw an average workers wage subscribe to Marxist principles.

This idea is based on the idea that politicians (or trade union officials) are there to serve the people of the country rather than earn themselves a fortune and/or raise their status (also known as careerism). Proponents claim that high wages for politicians are a waste of taxpayers' money and distance the politician from the concerns of the working class.

Examples of people taking only an average worker's wage are Socialist Party politician Joe Higgins, former MP Dave Nellist in the UK, John Marek, Forward Wales' Welsh Assembly member for Wrexham, and Sinn Féin politicians in Ireland. In The Ragged Trousered Philanthropists, Robert Tressell notes that the Labour Representation Committee MPs of the day took only an average workers' wage.

== See also ==
- List of countries by average wage
- Wages and salaries
