= Little Crosby =

Coordinates: 53.5058°N 3.0239°W

- Village
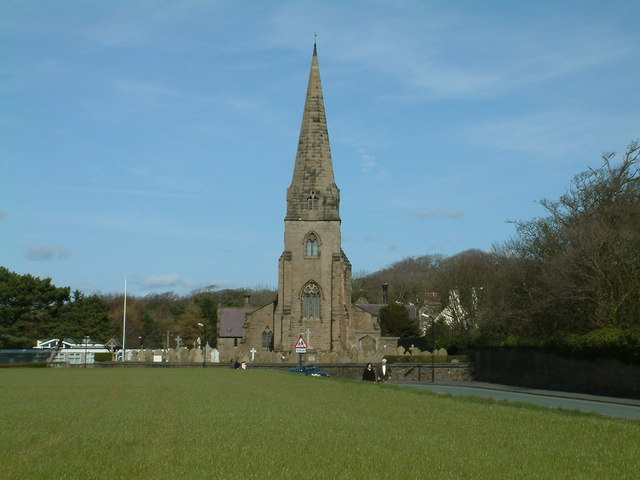
- St Mary's Church, Little Crosby

- Location within Merseyside
- OS grid reference: SD3231301409
- Metropolitan borough: Sefton
- Metropolitan county: Merseyside
- Region: North West
- Country: England
- Sovereign state: United Kingdom
- Post town: LIVERPOOL
- Postcode district: L23
- Dialling code: 0151
- Police: Merseyside
- Fire: Merseyside
- Ambulance: North West
- UK Parliament: Sefton Central

Little Crosby is a small village in the Sefton district of Merseyside, England. Despite being within 8 miles of Liverpool it has retained its rural character by, for example, opting not to have street lights. Until 1974 it was in Lancashire.

The village is perhaps the oldest extant Roman Catholic village in England, the squires being the notable recusant Blundell family. The village character has changed little from a 17th-century description that "it had not a beggar, ... an alehouse ... [or] a Protestant in it...". In 1931 the civil parish had a population of 1097.

Notable attractions are:

- Crosby Hall Educational Trust (CHET) an educational, residential centre for children and young people.
- The Well Barn, an attractive courtyard which has various small shops and businesses including a jewellery shop, florist, conservationist restorer and furniture makers

The village is dominated by the St Mary's Roman Catholic Church, inspired by Augustus Pugin. Opposite the church is St. Mary's Roman Catholic School, a single storey 1960s building. The first school for the village was established by the Squire, William Blundell, at Boundary Cottage in 1843, next to the brook that then ran between Great Crosby and Little Crosby. In 1859 the school moved to a new building next to the presbytery of the church, opposite the current site. The current school building replaced that in 1964. The school takes pupils from the village and neighbouring villages of Hightown and Ince Blundell.

== Governance ==
From 1950 until 2010 Little Crosby was within the boundaries of the Crosby constituency, whose Member of Parliament (MP)from 1997 till 2010 was Claire Curtis-Thomas, a member of the Labour Party, prior to her election the Crosby seat was generally considered to be a safe Conservative Party stronghold with Tory MP's elected at every election barring the 1981 Crosby by-election where Shirley Williams of the Social Democratic Party was elected to represent the constituency. As a result of boundary revisions for the 2010 general election the Crosby constituency was abolished with its northern parts, including Little Crosby, being merged with the Eastern parts of Sefton that were formerly part of the Knowsley North and Sefton East constituency, to form the new constituency of Sefton Central, which is currently represented by the Labour Party MP Bill Esterson.

For elections to Sefton Council Little Crosby is within the Manor electoral ward and is represented by three councillors. The councillors of Manor ward are Martyn Barber of the Conservative Party, John Gibson of the Liberal Democrats, and Steve McGinnity of the Labour Party.

Little Crosby was formerly a township in the parish of Sephton, in 1866 Little Crosby became a civil parish and in 1894 Little Crosby became an urban district, on 1 April 1932 the parish and urban district were abolished and merged with Great Crosby. This urban district was combined with other districts to form the municipal borough of Crosby in 1937. This in turn was absorbed into the new Metropolitan Borough of Sefton in 1974.

== See also ==
- Listed buildings in Little Crosby
