= Listed buildings in Great Crosby =

Great Crosby, or Crosby, is a town in the Metropolitan Borough of Sefton in Merseyside, England. It contains 100 buildings that are recorded in the National Heritage List for England as designated listed buildings. Of these, two are listed at Grade II*, the middle of the three grades, and the others are at Grade II, the lowest grade. The list includes listed buildings in the districts of Seaforth and Waterloo, but not those in the districts of Blundellsands and Little Crosby.

The area developed with the arrival of the railway in the middle of the 19th century, when the hamlet of Crosby Seabank was replaced by housing for the middle class. Most of the listed buildings are substantial private houses, many of them in the terraces of Beach Lawn, Adelaide Terrace, Marine Crescent, and Marine Terrace. The other listed buildings include churches and associated structures, schools, public buildings, public houses, a hotel, a cross, a former windmill, a fountain, a former cinema, and a war memorial with surrounding lamp standards.

== Key ==
| Grade | Criteria |
|---|---|
| II* | Particularly important buildings of more than special interest |
| II | Buildings of national importance and special interest |

== Buildings ==
| Name and location | Photograph | Date | Notes | Grade |
|---|---|---|---|---|
| Merchant Taylors' Girls' School; 53.48974°N 3.02508°W | — | 1620–22 | Founded as a boys' school, and later integrated into the girls' school after the boys moved to a different site. It is in sandstone with a stone-slate roof. The building is in two storeys and is symmetrical with a two-storey porch on the front and a stair turret at the rear. The windows are mullioned and transomed. | II* |
| Crosby Cross; 53.49236°N 3.02695°W | | 18th century | The cross was restored in 1986. The base stands on three square steps, all in sandstone. Two of the steps have inscriptions on the side. On the base is a restored wooden cross. | II |
| St Edmund's Manse; 53.47850°N 3.03371°W | | Late 18th century (probable) | Originally a house, later a Roman Catholic manse, altered in the 19th century. It is partly pebbledashed with stone dressings, and partly stuccoed, with a slate roof, and is in two storeys. It consists of a main range with a projecting wing to the right, a two-storey porch in the angle, and a conservatory to the left. The porch has a doorway with fluted pilasters, a frieze with triglyphs and metopes, and a dentilled pediment, above which is an oculus. | II |
| Windmill; 53.49529°N 3.01368°W | Windmill,_Great_Crosby,_Merseyside_(2) | 1813 | A former tower windmill, later converted into a house. It is in stuccoed brick with a domed metal-clad roof. The building tapers, and is in six storeys with a single-storey extension. In each storey are rectangular windows, there is a date stone, and stumps of the sails are still present. | II |
| Royal Hotel; 53.47164°N 3.02711°W | Royal_Hotel,_Waterloo] | 1815 | The hotel is pebbledashed with sandstone dressings and slate roofs. It has three storeys, with nine bays facing the Promenade, and five bays on the right side. On the Promenade front the middle three bays are set back, and a verandah runs along the ground floor. On the right side the middle three bays project forward under a pedimented gable. On the corners are painted quoins, and most of the windows are sashes. | II |
| Volunteer Canteen; 53.47506°N 3.03149°W | | c. 1820s (probable) | Originally a private house, it was converted into a public house in about 1871, and remodelled in 1924. It is in rendered brick with stone dressings and a slate roof. The building is in two storeys with an attic, and has a three-bay front. There is a central doorway flanked by lanterns and with a plaque above. Also in the ground floor are frosted windows with etched glazing, and another doorway. In the centre of the upper floor is a name plate including the date, which is flanked by sashes. Inside, the 1924 plan and features have been largely retained. | II |
| 2–14 Mersey View; 53.48095°N 3.03705°W | 2 - 14 Mersey View, Brighton-le-Sands persp | 1823 | A terrace of seven houses in brick with sandstone dressings and slate roofs. They have two storeys and each house is in two bays. Most of the houses have wooden trellis porches with swept hipped roofs, and most have canted bay windows. In the upper floor each house has two rectangular windows with arched head and Y-tracery. The front garden walls and gate piers are included in the listing. | II |
| 37 Victoria Road; 53.49233°N 3.03092°W | 37_Victoria_Road,_Crosby | Early 19th century | A brick house with a Welsh slate roof in two storeys. In the centre is a doorway with fluted Doric columns and a semicircular traceried fanlight. The windows are sashes with wedge lintels. | II |
| Ennis Cottage; 53.46970°N 3.02336°W | — | Early 19th century | A pair of stuccoed cottages with a hipped slate roof, in Regency style. They have a double-depth plan and are in two storeys. In the centre are paired doorways, each with a trellis porch and a blind window above. Between the floors is a Greek key, at the outer sides are panelled pilasters, and the windows are sashes. | II |
| 1 Marine Crescent; 53.47328°N 3.02981°W | 1_Marine_Crescent_1 | c. 1826–30 | A brick house at the end of a terrace with sandstone dressings and a slate roof. It is a symmetrical house in two storeys with three bays. In the centre is a Tuscan porch with a square-headed doorway. The windows are sashes. | II |
| 6 Marine Crescent; 53.47357°N 3.03029°W | 6_Marine_Crescent,_Waterloo | c. 1826–30 | A stuccoed house in a terrace, with a slate roof. It is a symmetrical house in two storeys with three bays. At the front is a three-bay verandah carried on fluted piers, with an open frieze and a lead-clad roof. In the centre is a square-headed doorway with a fluted surround and a fanlight. This is flanked by canted bay windows with casements. In the upper storey are two bay windows and a small rectangular window. | II |
| 7 Marine Crescent; 53.47364°N 3.03037°W | 7_Marine_Crescent,_Waterloo | c. 1826–30 | A stuccoed house in a terrace, with a slate roof. It is a symmetrical house in two storeys with three bays. At the front is a three-bay verandah carried on Tuscan columns, with a decorative frieze and a lead-clad roof. In the centre is a square-headed doorway with a moulded architrave and a fanlight. This is flanked by canted bay windows with sashes. In the upper storey are two oriel windows and a small rectangular window. | II |
| 8 Marine Crescent; 53.47370°N 3.03044°W | 8_Marine_Crescent,_Waterloo | c. 1826–30 | A stuccoed house in a terrace, with a slate roof and ridge tiles. It has two storeys and is in two bays. At the front is a decorative cast iron verandah with a lead-clad roof. In the ground floor is a square-headed doorway with a moulded architrave, and to the left are two sash windows. | II |
| 9 Marine Crescent; 53.47375°N 3.03052°W | 9_Marine_Crescent,_Waterloo | c. 1826–30 | A stuccoed house in a terrace, with a slate roof. It has two storeys and is in two bays. At the front is an ornate cast iron verandah with a lead-clad roof. In the ground floor is a square-headed doorway with a moulded architrave, and to the left is a canted bay window. The upper floor contains two canted oriel windows with pagoda roofs and terracotta finials. | II |
| 10 Marine Crescent; 53.47382°N 3.03057°W | 10_Marine_Crescent,_Waterloo | c. 1826–30 | A stuccoed house in a terrace, with a slate roof. It has two storeys and is in two bays. At the front is a simple verandah with angle-struts and a lead-clad roof. In the ground floor is a square-headed doorway, and to the left is a canted bay window. The windows are sashes. | II |
| 11 Marine Crescent; 53.47389°N 3.03066°W | 11_Marine_Crescent,_Waterloo | c. 1826–30 | A stuccoed house in a terrace, with a slate roof. It is a symmetrical house in two storeys with three bays. At the front is a verandah carried on cast iron columns with decorative tracery. In the centre is a square-headed doorway with a moulded architrave and a fanlight. This is flanked by canted bay windows with sashes, and in the upper floor are three oriel windows. | II |
| 12 Marine Crescent; 53.47395°N 3.03075°W | 12_Marine_Crescent,_Waterloo | c. 1826–30 | A stuccoed house in a terrace, with a slate roof. It has two storeys and is in two bays. At the front is a simple verandah carried on cast iron columns and with a wooden ornamental fringe. In the ground floor is a square-headed doorway with a moulded architrave, and to the left is a canted bay window with sashes. In the upper floor are two rectangular windows. | II |
| 13 Marine Crescent; 53.47399°N 3.03082°W | 13_Marine_Crescent,_Waterloo | c. 1826–30 | A stuccoed house in a terrace, with a slate roof. It has two storeys and is in two bays. At the front is a verandah carried on columns and with an ornamental cast iron fringe and a lead roof. In the ground floor is a square-headed doorway with a fanlight, and to the left is a canted bay window. The upper storey contains canted oriel windows. | II |
| 14 Marine Crescent; 53.47405°N 3.03090°W | 14_Marine_Crescent,_Waterloo | c. 1826–30 | A stuccoed house in a terrace, with a slate roof. It has two storeys and is in two bays. At the front is a simple verandah with a lead roof. In the ground floor is a square-headed doorway with a moulded architrave and, to the right, is a canted bay window. In the upper floor are two canted oriel windows. | II |
| 15 Marine Crescent; 53.47412°N 3.03099°W | 15_Marine_Crescent,_Waterloo | c. 1826–30 | A stuccoed house in a terrace, with a slate roof. It is a symmetrical house in two storeys with three bays. At the front is a verandah carried on columns with openwork brackets, and it has a lead roof. In the centre is a square-headed doorway with a moulded architrave and a fanlight. This is flanked by canted bay windows, and in the upper floor are sash windows with moulded architraves. | II |
| 16 and 16A Marine Crescent; 53.47421°N 3.03111°W | 16_Marine_Crescent,_Waterloo | c. 1826–30 | A stuccoed house in a terrace, with a slate roof. It is a symmetrical house in two storeys with three bays. At the front is a verandah carried on decorative cast iron standards and with a copper roof. In the centre is a square-headed doorway with a moulded architrave and a rectangular window above. These are flanked by two-storey canted bay windows. | II |
| 17 Marine Crescent; 53.47426°N 3.03122°W | 17_Marine_Crescent,_Waterloo | c. 1826–30 | A stuccoed house in a terrace, with a slate roof. It is a symmetrical house in two storeys with three bays. At the front is a verandah carried on wide decorative cast iron standards. In the centre is a square-headed doorway with a moulded architrave and a fanlight, flanked by canted bay windows. In the upper floor are sash windows. | II |
| 18 Marine Crescent; 53.47435°N 3.03132°W | 18_Marine_Crescent,_Waterloo | c. 1826–30 | A stuccoed house in a terrace, with a slate roof. It is a symmetrical house in two storeys with three bays. At the front is a verandah carried on decorative cast iron standards. In the centre is a square-headed doorway with a moulded architrave and a fanlight, flanked by canted bay windows. In the upper floor are sash windows. | II |
| 19 Marine Crescent; 53.47442°N 3.03144°W | 19_Marine_Crescent,_Waterloo | c. 1826–30 | A stuccoed house in a terrace, with a slate roof. It is a symmetrical house in two storeys with three bays. At the front is a verandah carried on latticed cast iron standards. In the centre is a square-headed doorway with a moulded architrave, flanked by canted bay windows. In the upper floor are sash windows. | II |
| 20 Marine Crescent; 53.47448°N 3.03154°W | 20_Marine_Crescent,_Waterloo | c. 1826–30 | A stuccoed house with stone dressings in a terrace, with a slate roof. It is a symmetrical house in two storeys with three bays. At the front is a verandah carried on latticed cast iron standards. In the centre is a square-headed doorway with a fanlight, flanked by canted bay windows. | II |
| 21 Marine Crescent; 53.47454°N 3.03160°W | 21_Marine_Crescent,_Waterloo | c. 1826–30 | A stuccoed house in a terrace, with a slate roof and ridge tiles. It is in two storeys with two bays. In the ground floor is an ornate cast iron verandah, a square-headed doorway with a fanlight, and a bay window with sashes. In the upper floor are canted oriel windows with pagoda roofs and terracotta finials. | II |
| 22 and 23 Marine Crescent; 53.47462°N 3.03171°W | 22_&_23_Marine_Crescent,_Waterloo | c. 1826–30 | A pair of rendered houses in a terrace, with slate roofs and a cast iron verandah. They are in two storeys, and each house has two bays. The doorways are square-headed with fanlights, and these are flanked by bay windows. The windows are sashes. | II |
| 24 and 25 Marine Crescent; 53.47467°N 3.03179°W | 25_Marine_Crescent,_Waterloo | c. 1826–30 | A pair of rendered houses in a terrace, with slate roofs and a cast iron verandah. They are in two storeys, and each house has two bays. The paired doorways are square-headed with fanlights, and these are flanked by bay windows. In the upper storey are a canted oriel window, two sash windows, and one window with altered glazing. | II |
| 26 and 27 Marine Crescent; 53.47481°N 3.03202°W | 26_&_27_Marine_Crescent,_Waterloo | c. 1826–30 | A pair of stuccoed houses in a terrace, with slate roofs and a cast iron verandah. They are in two storeys, and each house has two bays. The paired doorways are square-headed with fanlights, and these are flanked by bay windows. In the upper storey of No. 26 are two canted oriel windows, and No. 27 has two rectangular windows. | II |
| 28 Marine Crescent; 53.47484°N 3.03207°W | 28_Marine_Crescent,_Waterloo | c. 1826–30 | and a verandah carried on wooden posts. It is in two storeys with two bays. In the ground floor is a square-headed doorway with a fanlight, and a bay window to the left. In the upper floor are two bowed oriel windows. | II |
| 29 Marine Crescent; 53.47490°N 3.03217°W | 29_Marine_Crescent,_Waterloo | c. 1826–30 | A stuccoed house in a terrace, with a slate roof and a verandah carried on wooden posts. It is in two storeys with three bays. In the centre of the ground floor is a square-headed doorway with a fanlight, above which is a sash window with an architrave. These are flanked by two-storey bay windows, one rectangular and the other canted. | II |
| 30 Marine Crescent; 53.47496°N 3.03225°W | 30_Marine_Crescent,_Waterloo | c. 1826–30 | A stuccoed house in a terrace, with a slate roof and a verandah carried on decorative cast iron standards. It is in two storeys with two bays. In the ground floor is a square-headed doorway with a fanlight, and a bay window to the left. The upper floor windows contain 20th-century glazing. | II |
| 31 Marine Crescent; 53.47501°N 3.03237°W | 31_Marine_Crescent,_Waterloo | c. 1826–30 | A stuccoed house in a terrace, with a slate roof. Most of the front is occupied by a five-sided verandah with a balcony above, to the right of which is a square-headed doorway with a fanlight. There are French windows in both storeys, those in the upper storey flanked by sash windows. | II |
| 32 Marine Crescent; 53.47506°N 3.03248°W | 32_Marine_Crescent,_Waterloo | c. 1826–30 | A stuccoed house with a hipped slate roof at the end of a terrace. It is in two storeys with a verandah carried on wooden posts. On the front are two French windows in the ground floor, and windows with architraves above. The entrance is on the left side. | II |
| Crosby House, Nazareth House; 53.48450°N 3.02275°W | Crosby_House,_Crosby_2 | c. 1830–40 (probable) | Originally a villa, later used for other purposes, it is stuccoed with sandstone dressings and a hipped slate roof. The building is symmetrical with a U-shaped plan consisting of a three-bay main block and short side wings, and is in two storeys. In the centre is a Doric porch, the side wings contain bay windows, and they are pedimented. | II |
| 121 Liverpool Road; 53.48795°N 3.02360°W | 121_Liverpool_Road,_Crosby | Early to mid 19th century | A roughcast house with sandstone dressings and a slate roof in two storeys with a basement. Six steps on the left lead up to a round-headed doorway with set-in columns, a fanlight, and a keystone. To the right is a rectangular window, and to the right of this is a round-headed lobby door with a fanlight. There is also a central basement window and there are two windows in the upper floor. | II |
| 123 Liverpool Road; 53.48788°N 3.02361°W | 123_Liverpool_Road,_Crosby | Early to mid 19th century (probable) | A pebbledashed house with sandstone dressings and a slate roof in two storeys with a basement. It has a symmetrical front with a quarter-turned flight of steps to a central round-headed doorway. This has a wooden doorcase with fluted columns, a moulded cornice, and a keystone. The windows are sashes with quoined surrounds, two in the basement, two in the ground floor, and three in the upper floor. | II |
| 36 and 38 Moor Lane; 53.49374°N 3.02030°W | 36_&_38_Moor_Lane,_Crosby | Early to mid 19th century | A pair of stuccoed houses with roughcast gable ends. The roofs are in slate with ridge tiles. The houses are in two storeys and have central paired square-headed doorways with trellised porches. There are sash windows flanking the doorways and in the upper storey. | II |
| 1 Adelaide Terrace; 53.47519°N 3.03272°W | 1_Adelaide_Terrace,_Waterloo | c. 1840 (probable) | A stuccoed house with a slate roof at the end of a terrace. It is in three storeys, with three bays facing the Promenade, and a wing extending along Wellington Street. The front has flanking Doric pilasters, a gutter cornice, a central doorway, sash windows in the lower two storeys, and casement windows in the top floor. On the right side is a segmental-headed doorway with foliated consoles and a moulded head, and more windows. | II |
| 2–5 Marine Terrace; 53.47299°N 3.02929°W | 5_Marine_Terrace,_Waterloo | c. 1840 (probable) | A terrace of four stuccoed houses with slate roofs. They are in two storeys and have cast iron verandahs. Three of the houses are in two bays, and the other has a symmetrical front with three bays. There is one canted bay window, and the other windows are sashes. | II |
| 15 Marine Terrace; 53.47231°N 3.02767°W | 15_Marine_Terrace,_Waterloo | c. 1840 (probable) | A stuccoed house with sandstone dressings and a slate roof. It is in two storeys with an attic, and has four-bays facing the street. The doorway is square-headed with side-windows and a fanlight. To its left is a canted bay window, and in the attic is an oeil-de-boeuf window. The other windows are sashes with architraves including keystones. | II |
| Victoria Hotel; 53.47161°N 3.02667°W | | c. 1840 (probable) | A roughcast public house with a plinth, sandstone dressings, and a slate roof. It has an L-shaped plan, and consists of a three-storey two-bay block with a two-storey two-bay wing to the right. The main block is gabled and contains a roundel. The main entrance is square-headed with pilasters and a pediment on consoles. Most of the windows are sashes. | II |
| 26 and 28 Bath Street; 53.47190°N 3.02732°W | — | c. 1840–50 (probable) | A pair of roughcast houses with a slate roof. They are in two storeys and each has a two-bay front facing the Promenade. In the ground floor are three bay windows and a French window, and across the front is a cast iron verandah. The windows are sashes, and the entrances are at the rear. | II |
| Potter's Barn; 53.46983°N 3.01974°W | | 1841 | This originated as a gatehouse, and a coach house and stables, forming two blocks at right angles joined by an archway. It is built in sandstone with slate roofs, and is in Tudor style. Both blocks contain a Tudor arched coach entrance. Other features include mullioned windows and arrow slits. | II |
| Former Christ Church School; 53.47189°N 3.02452°W | — | 1842 | The former school is in brick with sandstone dressings and a slate roof. It has an F-shaped plan and is in a single storey. The windows have rusticated quoins, and there is an inscribed stone tablet including the date. | II |
| 3–19 Adelaide Terrace; 53.47572°N 3.03343°W | — | c. 1847–50 (probable) | A terrace of 17 stuccoed houses with slate roofs. Two of the houses are in three storeys, and the others are in two storeys with attics; two (different) houses are in four bays, and the rest are in three bays. Between the houses are giant Doric pilasters, and the houses are broadly similar to each other. All the doorways are square-headed with fanlights, one house is pedimented, some have dormers, and most of the windows are sashes. | II |
| 6, 7 and 8 Marine Terrace; 53.47285°N 3.02894°W | 7_Marine_Terrace,_Waterloo | c. 1847–50 (probable) | A row of three stuccoed houses in a terrace with slate roofs and a cast iron verandah. They are in two storeys with attics, and each house has a three-bay front. The doorways have fanlights, and on the ground floor are two French windows. The other windows are sashes, and there is a blind window in the centre of each upper storey. | II |
| 9–12 Marine Terrace; 53.47268°N 3.02853°W | 9_-_12_Marine_Terrace,_Waterloo | c. 1847–50 (probable) | A terrace of four stuccoed houses with slate roofs. They are in two storeys and have a cast iron verandah. Each pair of houses has five windows in the upper storey, the middle of which is blind. The doorways have side-windows and fanlights. Most of the windows are sashes, one of the houses has a bay window, and two have oriel windows in the upper storey with dormers above. | II |
| 13 Marine Terrace; 53.47261°N 3.02834°W | 13_Marine_Terrace,_Waterloo | c. 1847–50 (probable) | A stuccoed house with a slate roof and a verandah on cast iron columns at the end of a terrace. It is in three storeys and has a three-bay front. The doorway is in the right bay, it is square-headed, and has a fanlight. The windows are sashes, those in the middle storey having louvred shutters. | II |
| Gate piers and railings, 2–14 Marine Terrace; 53.47268°N 3.02908°W | Gates_and_railings_of_2_-_14_Marine_Terrace,_Waterloo | c. 1847–50 (probable) | The gate piers and the plinths carrying the railings are in monolithic sandstone blocks. The railings are in cast iron, and have arrowhead tops. | II |
| Station House; 53.48575°N 3.03815°W | Station_House,_Crosby_2 | c. 1848 (probable) | Originally a stationmaster's house for the Liverpool, Crosby and Southport Railway, it is in rendered brick with a tiled roof. The house has two storeys and a symmetrical front with small side wings. In the centre is a Tudor arched doorway with a fanlight flanked by three-light mullioned windows containing casements. In the upper storey are sash windows. | II |
| 2 Adelaide Terrace; 53.47524°N 3.03282°W | 2_Adelaide_Terrace,_Waterloo | Mid 19th century | A stuccoed house with a slate roof, remodelled in the late 19th century, and forming part of a terrace. It is in three storeys with a large two-storey canted bay window, and a segmental-headed doorway to the left. At the top of the house is a gable with wavy bargeboards and a finial. There is one French window, the other windows being sashes. | II |
| 37 Great George's Road; 53.47291°N 3.02271°W | 37_Great_George's_Road,_Waterloo_2 | Mid 19th century | A villa in red and yellow brick, on a plinth, with sandstone dressings and a hipped slate roof. It is in two storeys with a cellar, and has a symmetrical three-bay front. In the centre is a round-headed doorway with a moulded surround and a fanlight. The windows are sashes with architraves, and on the right side are two bay windows. | II |
| 28 and 30 Moor Lane; 53.49370°N 3.02092°W | 28_&_30_Moor_Lane,_Crosby | Mid 19th century | A pair of roughcast houses with sandstone dressings and slate roofs with stone gable copings. They are in two storeys and have a symmetrical front. The doorways are round-headed with in pilastered doorcases. Each house has one sash window in the ground floor and two in the upper floor. | II |
| 32 and 34 Moor Lane; 53.49373°N 3.02068°W | 32_&_34_Moor_Lane,_Crosby | Mid 19th century | A pair of roughcast houses with sandstone dressings and slate roofs in two storeys. The doorway of No. 32 is on the right, and that of No. 34 is in the centre; they are both round-headed with keystones in pilastered doorcases. Flanking the doorway of No. 34 are single-storey canted bay windows. The other windows are sashes. | II |
| 52 and 54 Waterloo Road; 53.47001°N 3.02371°W | — | Mid 19th century | A pair of houses in red and yellow brick with stone dressings and a slate roof, in late Georgian style. They are in a double-depth plan, have two storeys, and each house has two bays. The doorways are round-headed with rusticated surrounds and keystones, and between them are bay windows. Most of the windows are sashes. | II |
| 1–12 Wellington Street, 54 East Street; 53.47555°N 3.03122°W | — | Mid 19th century | A terrace of six brick houses with stone dressings and slate roofs. They have a double-depth plan, and are in two storeys with cellars. Five steps lead up to the paired doorways, which are square-headed, each with a moulded architrave, a dentilled cornice, and a fanlight. Each house has a two-storey bow, with two windows in each floor, and another above the doorway. | II |
| 9 Wellington Street; 53.47563°N 3.03182°W | — | Mid 19th century | A roughcast house with a slate roof, in two storeys with an attic. The central doorway is pilastered with a frieze, a cornice and a fanlight. To the right is a bay window, and to the left is a casement. In the upper floor are three sash windows. On the left side are a doorway, two windows in the ground floor and two in the attic. | II |
| Riverslie; 53.46761°N 3.01756°W | Riverslie,_Seaforth | Mid 19th century (probable) | A roughcast villa, later used for other purposes, with a slate roof, in Neo-Jacobean style. It is in two storeys with attics and has a four-bay front. The first bay has a parapet, the second and fourth bays are gabled, and the third bay rises to form a three-stage embattled tower. The first bay contains a bay window, and the fourth bay a porch. Across the front is a cast iron verandah carried on Perpendicular-style standards. | II |
| Sacred Heart School; 53.48663°N 3.02334°W | Sacred_Heart_College,_Crosby | Mid 19th century (probable) | Originally a villa, later used as part of a school, it is roughcast with sandstone dressings and has a hipped slate roof. The building is in two storeys with attics, and has a near-symmetrical three-bay front in Classical style. In the centre is a porch with four Tuscan pilasters, a plain frieze and a moulded cornice. The doorway is round-headed with imposts and a keystone. The windows are sashes, and there are three semicircular attic dormers. | II |
| St Luke's Church; 53.49098°N 3.02406°W | | 1853–54 | The church was designed by A. and G. Holme in Decorated style. It was severely damaged by fire in 1972, and most of the east end was destroyed. The church was rebuilt with a new sheet metal roof, apse, and vestries. It is constructed in sandstone and consists of a nave, north and south transepts, a chancel, and a west steeple. The steeple has a three-stage tower, a semicircular stair turret, and a broach spire. | II |
| 16 Beach Lawn; 53.47735°N 3.03627°W | — | c. 1860–80 | A brick house with stone dressings and a slate roof in free Gothic style. It has 2 1/2 storeys. In the ground floor of the main part is a canted bay window, in the upper floor is a Tudor arched casement window, and above are corner pinnacles, and a gabled half-dormer with a finial containing a window. To the right is a small set-back bay with a machiolated parapet. | II |
| Town Hall; 53.47220°N 3.02495°W | | 1862 | The town hall was designed by F. S. Spencer Yates in Italianate style, and was extended in 1892. It is built in sandstone with a hipped slate roof, and is in two storeys. The building has a square plan with an extension at the rear and a wing to the right. The entrance front is symmetrical in three bays, and has a central porch with four Tuscan columns, a frieze, a cornice, and a balustraded parapet. At the top of the building is a dentilled cornice, and the windows have architraves. | II |
| St John's Church; 53.47661°N 3.02977°W | | 1864–65 | Designed by William Culshaw, the church is in Early English style. It is built in sandstone with slate roofs, and consists of a nave with a south porch and a north baptistry, transepts, and a chancel. It has a bellcote on the west gable, lancet windows, and dormers in the roof. | II |
| 1 and 2 Beach Lawn; 53.47642°N 3.03437°W | — | Mid to late 19th century | A pair of stuccoed houses with slate roofs in 2 1/2 storeys. No. 1 has one bay facing the Promenade, and three (containing the entrance) on the right side; No. 2 has two bays facing the Promenade. An elaborate cast iron verandah runs along the Promenade front. Features include a bowed window, a bay window, and windows with decorative surrounds and hood moulds. The windows are sashes. | II |
| 3–7 Beach Lawn; 53.47657°N 3.03463°W | — | Mid to late 19th century | A terrace of five stuccoed houses with slate roofs, and including Italianate architectural features. They are in 2 1/2 storeys, and have fronts of two or three bays. An elaborate cast iron verandah runs along the front. Other features include gables, bay windows, Venetian windows, decorative hood moulds, and square-headed doorways with side lights and fanlights. | II |
| 8 and 9 Beach Lawn; 53.47682°N 3.03513°W | — | Mid to late 19th century | A pair of stuccoed houses with slate roofs in Italianate style forming part of a terrace. They are in 2 1/2 storeys, and have a front of three bays. An elaborate cast iron verandah runs along the front, carrying a balcony in the middle bay. The outer bays have open-pedimental gables, and in the middle bay are two dormers. Other features include square-headed doorways with pilasters and fanlights, canted bay windows, and windows with architraves. | II |
| 10 Beach Lawn; 53.47691°N 3.03531°W | — | Mid to late 19th century | A stuccoed house with a slate roof in Italianate style forming part of a terrace. It is in 2 1/2 storeys, and has a projecting wing on the left. The wing has pilasters, an open pedimented gable, and contains a canted bay window, a tripartite window, and a Venetian window. An elaborate cast iron verandah runs along the front of the house. Between the floors is a moulded cornice surmounted by elaborate railings. | II |
| 13 Beach Lawn; 53.47715°N 3.03591°W | | Mid to late 19th century | A stuccoed house with a slate roof in Italianate style. It is in 2 1/2 storeys, it has a projecting wing on the left, and a screen wall and conservatory to the right. In the wing is a two-storey canted bay window, above which is a Venetian window and an open-pedimented gable. In the main range is a doorway with side-windows and a fanlight, a bay window, and other windows, including a half-dormer with a semicircular canopy. The house was built for Thomas Ismay of the White Star Line. | II |
| 14 and 15 Beach Lawn; 53.47727°N 3.03607°W | — | Mid to late 19th century | A pair of similar stuccoed houses with slate roofs in Italianate style. They are in three storeys with cellars, and each house has a two-bay front. In the left bay steps lead up to a pilastered doorway, above which are two-light windows. The right bays contain a two-storey canted bay window with a balustraded parapet, and a three-light window above. | II |
| Gate piers, 14 and 15 Beach Lawn; 53.47709°N 3.03629°W | — | Mid to late 19th century | These consist of two larger piers flanking a carriage entrance, and a smaller pier to the right with a pedestrian gate. The piers are in sandstone with cross-gabled tops, the smaller pier being a monolith. The gate is in wrought iron, and contains scroll-work. | II |
| Cottage Farmhouse; 53.50292°N 3.01301°W | — | Mid to late 19th century | The farmhouse is roughcast with a slate roof, and is in cottage orné style. It has an irregular plan with a wing on the left and is in two storeys. There is a central full-height gabled porch, within which is a secondary porch. On the right is a casement window, with a gabled half-dormer above. To the left is a single-storey bay window, above which is a sash window. All the gables have decorative bargeboards. | II |
| Hapwood House; 53.47703°N 3.03551°W | — | Mid to late 19th century | Originally a pair of stuccoed houses, later combined, with slate roofs in Italianate style. The house is in 2 1/2 storeys, and the central portion is flanked by projecting gabled wings. The doorways have Tuscan pilastered architraves with entablatures, side-windows, and fanlights. Other features include a bow window, a rectangular bay window, a canted three-storey bay window, a Venetian window, and two Venetian-style dormers. | II |
| Marbenthe; 53.47248°N 3.02811°W | — | Mid to late 19th century | A former villa, it is pebble dashed with stone dressings, a slate roof, and a cast iron verandah. The building is in two storeys with an attic. There are two bays facing Marine Drive, and an entrance front of three bays containing a square-headed doorway. Most of the windows are sashes, there are bay windows facing the drive, and a round-headed window in the gable of the entrance front. | II |
| 17 Beach Lawn; 53.47746°N 3.03635°W | — | 1867 | A brick house with sandstone dressings, a slate roof, and red ridge tiles. It is in High Victorian Gothic style, with two storeys and two unequal gabled bays. In the larger left bay is a two-storey canted bay window with a hipped roof. The right bay contains a glazed porch and above this is a canted oriel window. The entrance is on the left side. | II |
| Wall and gate piers, 1–13 Beach Lawn; 53.47664°N 3.03537°W | — | c. 1867 | The wall and gate piers are in rendered brick. The wall has sandstone coping. The piers are square with chamfered bases and corners, and have low pyramidal caps. | II |
| Streatham House School; 53.48988°N 3.03368°W | — | c. 1870–80 | Originally a pair of semi-detached houses, later converted into a school. It is in brown brick with dressings and decoration in blue and yellow brick, and has a slate roof. The school is in two storeys with attics, and four bays, the outer bays projecting forward, gabled, and each containing a single-storey bay window. Most of the windows are sashes, there is a gabled half-dormer with decorative bargeboards, and on the sides of the school are porches. | II |
| St Nicholas' Church; 53.48439°N 3.04003°W | | 1873–74 | The church was designed by Thomas D. Barry and Sons in Decorated style, and a baptistery was added to the west end in 1894 by W. D. Caroe. It is built in sandstone with a slate roof. The church consists of a nave with a clerestory, aisles with porches, an apsidal chancel, and a polygonal west baptistery. At the junction of the nave and the chancel is a copper-clad flèche with crockets and a finial. | II |
| Coach House, 13 Beach Lawn; 53.47779°N 3.03478°W | — | Late 19th century | The former coach house is in red and yellow (and some blue) brick with a hipped slate roof, and is in Gothic style. It has two storeys and a symmetrical seven-bay front. The central bay has a segmental-headed archway above which is an oriel window, and a tower with a pyramidal roof containing a canopied dormer. On each side are three bays, the central bay having a doorway over which is a corbelled half-dormer. | II |
| Crow's Nest Public House; 53.49282°N 3.02974°W | | Late 19th century | The public house is in three storeys, the ground floor with green glazed tiling, and roughcast above. In the ground floor are two doorways and rectangular windows. Between the upper floors are two bands ending in pilasters. In the upper floors are sash windows, those in the middle floor having moulded architraves, plain friezes and cornices. | II |
| Lamp standards 53.47315°N 3.02151°W | — | Late 19th century (probable) | Three lamp standards surround the war memorial on a road island. They are in cast iron and consist of simple columns with scrolled branches carrying pendant glass globes. | II |
| Main Building, Merchant Taylors' Boys' School; 53.48343°N 3.02436°W | | 1878 | The school was designed by Lockwood and Mawson in Gothic style. It is built in red brick with dressings in sandstone and terracotta and with green slate roofs. The building has a U-shaped plan with a central block and receding wings. It is in a tall single storey with attics, and has a central clock tower flanked by classrooms and lateral pavilions. On the tower are four turrets, an embattled parapet, and a two-stage louvred lantern with a pyramidal roof. | II |
| Headmaster's House, Merchant Taylors' Boys' School; 53.48334°N 3.02532°W | — | c. 1878 (probable) | The headmaster's house, later used as offices, was probably designed by Lockwood and Mawson. It is in eclectic style, and is constructed in red brick with sandstone and terracotta dressings and it has a slate roof. It is in a square plan with projecting gabled wings, and has two storeys. | II |
| Entrance Lodge, Merchant Taylors' Boys' School; 53.48343°N 3.02347°W | — | c. 1878 (probable) | The entrance lodge to the school was probably designed by Lockwood and Mawson. It is in Tudor style, and constructed in red brick with sandstone dressings and a slate roof. The lodge has an elongated cruciform plan, and is in a single storey. Its features include a timber-framed porch, gables with panelled bargeboards, and sash windows. | II |
| Entrance Gateway, Merchant Taylors' Boys' School; 53.48328°N 3.02327°W | — | c. 1878 (probable) | The gateway consists of four piers and gates. The piers are in sandstone and have pyramidal tops. They flank a central carriage gateway and lateral pedestrian gateways, and contain cast iron gates. | II |
| St Mary's Church; 53.47412°N 3.01822°W | | 1882–83 | The church was designed by W. B. Habershon, and was extended in 1907. It is built in red sandstone with yellow sandstone dressings and has a slate roof. It is in Early English style, and has a cruciform plan. The church consists of a nave with a 20th-century narthex and a clerestory, aisles, transepts, and a chancel. There is an uncompleted tower at the crossing. | II |
| International Hotel; 53.46281°N 3.01496°W | | c. 1890–1910 (probable) | A public house in Renaissance style. It is built in red brick with stone dressings, and has a slated Mansard roof. The building has a wedge-shaped plan, it is in two storeys with an attic, and has six bays on one front, seven on the other, and another bay on the corner. On the top of the corner bay is a triumphal arch, and along the top of the building are pineapple finials. | II |
| Waterloo United Free Church and Hall; 53.47801°N 3.02260°W | — | 1891 | The church, originally a Baptist church, and the hall were designed by George Baines and Son in Arts and Crafts Gothic style. They are in Accrington brick with terracotta dressings and have slate roofs. The church consists of a nave, north and south porches, and north and south transepts. Its façade is symmetrical, it is in two storeys, and has a gable with a square finial. The church is linked to the hall on the left, which is in a similar style but smaller. | II |
| Christ Church; 53.47088°N 3.02381°W | | 1891–94 | A church, now redundant, by Paley, Austin and Paley in Perpendicular style. It is built in sandstone with green slate roofs, and consists of a nave with a clerestory and a baptistry, north and south aisles, northwest and southwest porches, a north transept, a chancel with a north vestry and a south chapel, and a northeast tower. The tower is in three stages with a northwest octagonal stair turret rising to a pinnacle, and an embattled parapet. | II* |
| Wall, gateways and gates, Christ Church; 53.47090°N 3.02432°W | — | c. 1891–99 | Designed probably by Hubert Austin, the wall and gate piers are in sandstone. The wall is on the north and west sides of the churchyard. There are three gateways, the piers having traceried panels and curved tops. The gates are in wrought iron. | II |
| Crosby United Reformed Church; 53.48753°N 3.03431°W | | 1897–98 | Originally a Congregational church, it was designed by Douglas and Fordham. The church is in sandstone with a green slate roof, and consists of a nave with a clerestory, aisles, north and south transepts, and a chancel with a vestry. Over the nave is a flèche, and at the corners of the west end are octagonal turrets. Most of the windows are lancets. Inside the church is a hammerbeam roof. | II |
| Our Lady Star of the Sea Church; 53.46328°N 3.00941°W | | 1898–1901 | A Roman Catholic church by Sinnott, Sinnott and Powell. It is in pale Parbold sandstone with red sandstone dressings and slate roofs. The church consists of a nave with a clerestory, aisles, a baptistry, a triple transept, and an apsidal chancel. At the southeast is the base of an uncompleted steeple that is capped in copper. Inside, the arcades have polished granite piers and capitals with naturalistic carving. | II |
| St Faith's Church; 53.48108°N 3.02280°W | | 1898–1900 | The church was designed by Grayson and Ould in free Gothic style. It is in red Accrington brick with pink sandstone dressings and green slate roofs. The plan consists of a nave with a clerestory, aisles, north and south porches, north and south transepts, and a chancel. At the southeast is a slender octagonal tower with a spirelet. Inside, the chancel screen was designed by Giles Gilbert Scott while the carving Rabbit Madonna was by Mother Maribel of Wantage. | II |
| Seaforth Arms Hotel; 53.46563°N 3.00728°W | | c. 1900–10 | A public house in Edwardian Baroque style with two storeys. The ground floor is in rusticated sandstone on a polished brown granite plinth; the upper storey is in Accrington brick with sandstone dressings. It consists of a main range, a wing at an angle, and a canted porch between. Features include a round-headed porch with a cartouche in its pediment and a turret above, another cartouche in a gable, a large semicircular plaque, and an octagonal copper dome. | II |
| Carnegie Library; 53.48698°N 3.03313°W | | 1904 | The library was paid for by Andrew Carnegie and designed by Anderson and Crawford. It is in Accrington brick with sandstone dressings, green slate roofs, and red ridge tiles. The library is in a single storey and has a three-bay front. Above the central entrance is a balustraded parapet and a dome. On top of the library is a two-stage turret with a clock face and an ogival domed roof with a finial. | II |
| Adult Training Centre; 53.47112°N 3.01608°W | | 1912 | Originally Waterloo Grammar School, the building is in red brick with sandstone dressings and a slate roof, and is in Queen Anne style. It is symmetrical with a two-storey main range and flanking wings, and a single-storey range in front between the wings. Features include a Venetian window, three three-light dormers, and a two-stage cupola with a finial. | II |
| John Cross Memorial Fountain; 53.46464°N 3.00748°W | | 1912 | A drinking fountain to the memory of John Cross, a police superintendent who organised soup kitchens for the poor. It is in limestone and consists of a round-headed pillar containing a bowl under a round-headed niche. Above this is a bronze plaque with a relief of John Cross, and an inscription detailing his service. | II |
| Former Palladium Cinema; 53.46379°N 3.00745°W | | 1913 | The former cinema has a façade in faience, with brick elsewhere and a slate roof. It is in Edwardian Baroque style, with two storeys and a symmetrical three-bay front. The central bay has a doorway over which is an oculus with a festoon, and a pediment containing a wreath and the date. On both floors the outer bays contain triple windows with architraves, keystones, and festoons. | II |
| War Memorial, Crosby Road North; 53.47314°N 3.02151°W | | 1921 | The memorial was designed by Francis W. Doyle Jones. It consists of a square granite column about 4 metres (13 ft) high with a bronze figure of an angel holding an olive branch and a wreath, representing Victory. There are inscriptions on the column. | II |
| War Memorial, Alexandra Park; 53.48799°N 3.03180°W | | 1923 | The memorial was designed by Joseph Watson Cabré, and is in Hopton Wood Stone. It is about 5 metres (16 ft) high, and consists of a broad obelisk with a cornice on a base and a polygonal step. On top of the obelisk is a basin in which is a two-stepped capstone. Four stilts rise from this and support an electric light. The obelisk is decorated with a Greek key pattern and rosettes, and is inscribed. There is also an inscription on the front of the base. | II |

== See also ==
- Listed buildings in Little Crosby
