= Crosby, Merseyside =

Town in Merseyside, England

Coordinates: 53.487°N 3.034°W

Crosby
- Town
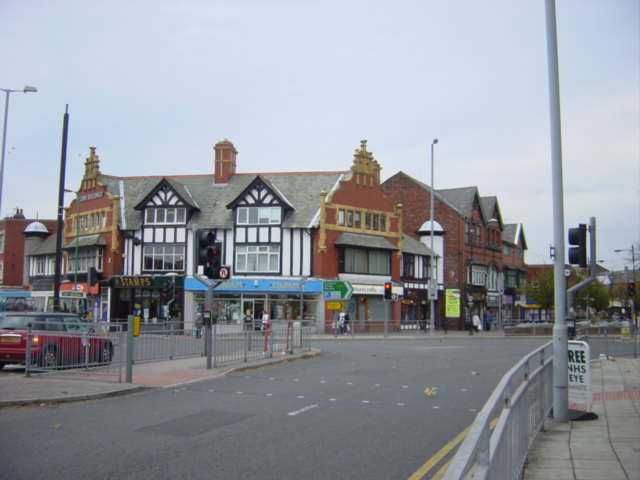
- Crown Buildings, Crosby

- Location within Merseyside
- Population: 50,044 (2011 census)
- OS grid reference: SJ320999
- Metropolitan borough: Sefton
- Metropolitan county: Merseyside
- Region: North West
- Country: England
- Sovereign state: United Kingdom
- Districts of the town: List: Blundellsands; Brighton-le-Sands; Great Crosby; Little Crosby (Village); Seaforth; Waterloo (Town)
- Post town: LIVERPOOL
- Postcode district: L23
- Dialling code: 0151
- Police: Merseyside
- Fire: Merseyside
- Ambulance: North West
- UK Parliament: Bootle; Sefton Central

Crosby is a coastal town in the Metropolitan Borough of Sefton, Merseyside, England. it is north of Bootle, south of Southport and Formby, and west of Netherton. It borders the areas of Blundellsands to the north and Waterloo to the south. It is approximately 6 miles (9.6 km) north of Liverpool.

== History ==
The town has Viking roots in common with the other -by suffixed settlements of Formby to the north and Kirkby to the east. Crosby was known as Krossabyr in Old Norse, meaning "village with the cross". The settlement was recorded in the Domesday Book of 1086 as Crosebi, and by the year 1212 had become Crosseby. Local people are known as Crosbeians and were referred to as such in the local press but the term is little used today.

The opening of the Liverpool, Crosby and Southport Railway in 1848 resulted in the growth of Crosby as a suburb of Liverpool.

Before the creation of Merseyside the town was located in Lancashire.

== Governance ==
Crosby formed part of the Crosby parliamentary constituency from 1950 until 2010. The member of parliament (MP) for Crosby from 1997 until 2010 was Claire Curtis-Thomas, a member of the Labour Party; prior to her election the seat was generally considered to be a safe Conservative Party stronghold with Tory MPs elected at every election barring the 1981 Crosby by-election where Shirley Williams of the Social Democratic Party was elected to represent the constituency. As a result of boundary revisions for the 2010 general election the Crosby constituency was abolished and Crosby town was divided between two constituencies, with the two electoral wards of South Crosby, Church and Victoria, containing the urbanised bulk of the town which includes the areas of Great Crosby, Waterloo and Seaforth, being absorbed into the expanded Bootle constituency, represented by the Labour MP Peter Dowd, and the two electoral wards of northern Crosby, Blundellsands and Manor, which contains residential suburban areas such as, Blundellsands, Brighton-Le-Sands, Little Crosby, Thornton, and Hightown, forming part of the new Sefton Central constituency represented by Bill Esterson, also a Labour MP.

== Administration ==
Crosby became part of the municipal borough of Crosby in 1937 by the merger of the urban districts of Great Crosby and Waterloo with Seaforth, both in the administrative county of Lancashire. This borough was succeeded by the new Metropolitan Borough of Sefton in Merseyside on 1 April 1974.

For elections to Sefton Council Crosby is covered by a range of council wards as detailed above: the Victoria ward, covers Great Crosby and North Waterloo, and is represented by three councillors. They are now all Labour Party councillors Michael Roche, Leslie Byrom CBE FRCIS, and Jan Grace.

== Twin towns and sister cities ==
Crosby, Merseyside is twinned with Capri, Italy.

== Geography ==
Crosby as an area was composed of a string of settlements along the Irish Sea coast. These areas were part of the urban districts of Great Crosby and Waterloo with Seaforth and the Municipal Borough of Crosby before it too was abolished and became part of the Metropolitan Borough of Sefton. These areas are:

- Great Crosby – The main area which gave the town and the old municipal borough its name, despite the confusion that exists, Great Crosby is not the actual town itself but is the largest area of it which was an urban district in its own right which merged with Waterloo with Seaforth urban district to form the Municipal Borough of Crosby and defined the town of Crosby in its present borders.
- Little Crosby – A small village considered to be the oldest existent Roman Catholic village in England.
- Blundellsands – An area to the north west of Great Crosby. It abuts the northern section of Crosby Beach, the location of Antony Gormley's Another Place.
- Waterloo – An area situated southwest of Great Crosby, originally known as Crosby Seabank. It includes Crosby Civic Hall and Library, and the Plaza Community Cinema. It abuts the southern section of Crosby Beach, the location of Antony Gormley's Another Place.
- Brighton-le-Sands – An area situated between Blundellsands to the north, Waterloo to the south and Great Crosby to the east.
- Thornton – A village situated to the northeast of Great Crosby.

=== Climate ===
Climate data for Crosby (9m elevation) 1991–2020
| Month | Jan | Feb | Mar | Apr | May | Jun | Jul | Aug | Sep | Oct | Nov | Dec | Year |
|---|---|---|---|---|---|---|---|---|---|---|---|---|---|
| Mean daily maximum °C (°F) | 7.5 (45.5) | 7.9 (46.2) | 9.9 (49.8) | 12.8 (55.0) | 15.9 (60.6) | 18.4 (65.1) | 20.0 (68.0) | 19.7 (67.5) | 17.7 (63.9) | 14.2 (57.6) | 10.5 (50.9) | 8.0 (46.4) | 13.5 (56.4) |
| Mean daily minimum °C (°F) | 2.8 (37.0) | 2.7 (36.9) | 3.9 (39.0) | 5.6 (42.1) | 8.3 (46.9) | 11.3 (52.3) | 13.5 (56.3) | 13.5 (56.3) | 11.2 (52.2) | 8.5 (47.3) | 5.7 (42.3) | 3.1 (37.6) | 7.5 (45.5) |
| Average rainfall mm (inches) | 69.4 (2.73) | 57.1 (2.25) | 53.3 (2.10) | 49.8 (1.96) | 52.5 (2.07) | 64.4 (2.54) | 65.5 (2.58) | 72.1 (2.84) | 76.6 (3.02) | 89.7 (3.53) | 82.2 (3.24) | 91.9 (3.62) | 824.5 (32.48) |
| Average rainy days (≥ 1.0 mm) | 13.8 | 11.5 | 11.3 | 10.0 | 9.8 | 10.4 | 11.0 | 12.2 | 11.8 | 14.4 | 15.5 | 15.4 | 147.1 |
Source: Met Office

== Demography ==
Crosby compared
| 2001 UK census | Crosby | Sefton (borough) | England |
| Total population | 51,789 | 282,958 | 49,138,831 |
| White | 98.4% | 98.4% | 91.0% |
| Asian | 0.5% | 0.4% | 4.6% |
| Black | 0.1% | 0.2% | 2.3% |

At the 2001 UK census, Crosby had a population of 51,789. The 2001 population density was 12,502 inhabitants per square mile (4,827/km^{2}), with a 100 to 89.2 female-to-male ratio. Of those over 16 years old, 31.2% were single (never married), 43.2% married and 8.2% divorced. The proportion of divorced people was above that of Sefton and England (both 6.6%), and the incidences of those who were single and married differed significantly from the national and Sefton averages (Sefton: 43.1% single, 35.5% married; England: 44.3% single, 34.7% married). Sefton's 21,250 households included 32.7% one-person, 35.7% married couples living together, 6.6% were co-habiting couples, and 11.3% single parents with their children. Of those aged 16–74, 28.1% had no academic qualifications, similar to 28.9% in all of England and slightly lower than the 31.0% for the Sefton borough.

Population growth in the town of Crosby since 1801

| Year | Population | ±% |
|---|---|---|
| 1801 | 1,391 | — |
| 1811 | 1,504 | +8.1% |
| 1821 | 1,805 | +20.0% |
| 1831 | 2,462 | +36.4% |

| Year | Population | ±% |
|---|---|---|
| 1841 | 3,194 | +29.7% |
| 1851 | 3,669 | +14.9% |
| 1871 | 7,628 | +107.9% |
| 1881 | 10,717 | +40.5% |

| Year | Population | ±% |
|---|---|---|
| 1891 | 14,625 | +36.5% |
| 1901 | 31,877 | +118.0% |
| 1911 | 39,513 | +24.0% |
| 1931 | 50,569 | +28.0% |

| Year | Population | ±% |
|---|---|---|
| 1939 | 53,135 | +5.1% |
| 1951 | 58,414 | +9.9% |
| 1961 | 59,166 | +1.3% |
| 2001 | 51,789 | −12.5% |

Source: , Crosby Historical Population, Crosby mid-20th century population

== Education ==
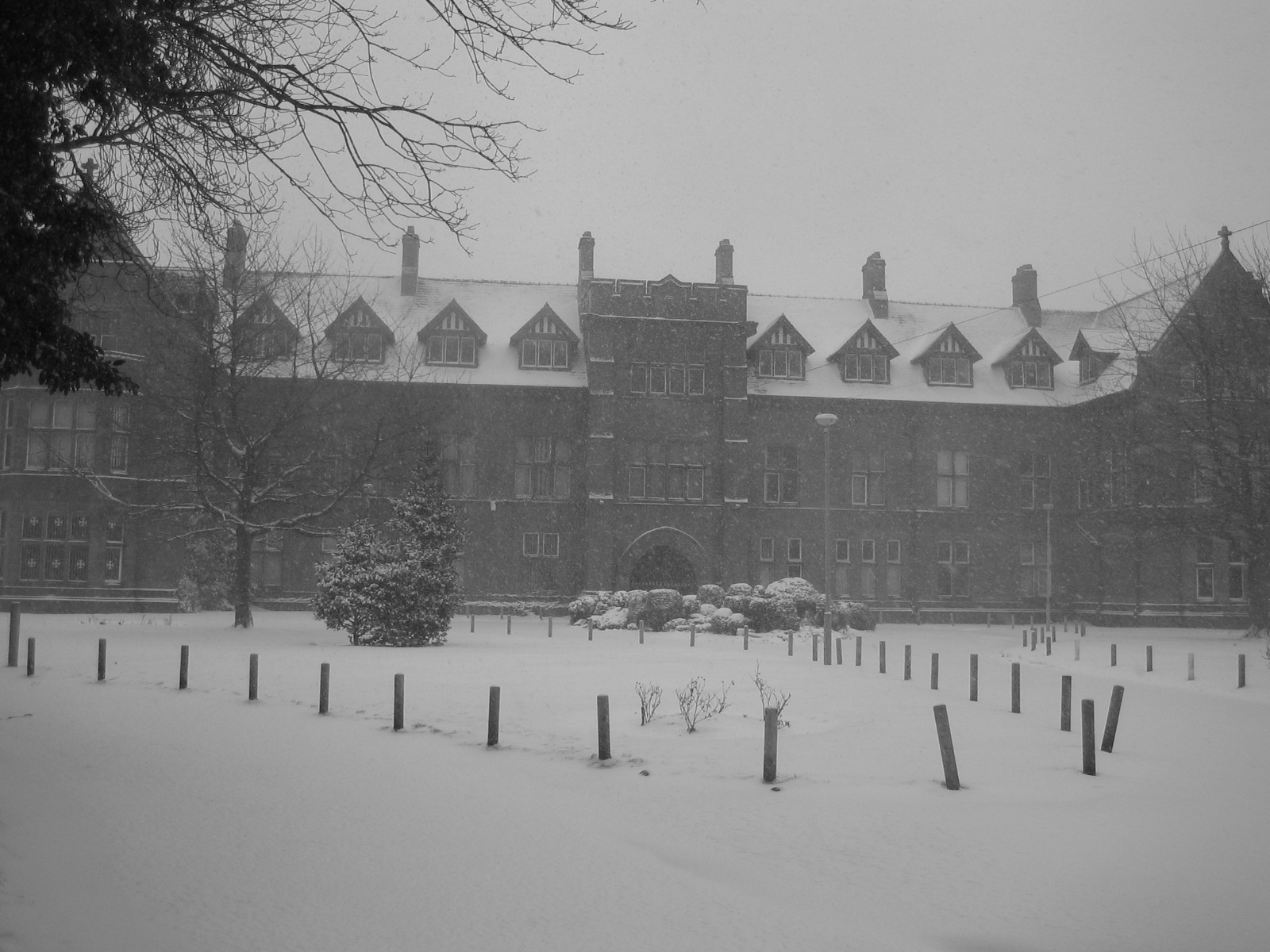
Sacred Heart Catholic College

Independent schools in the area include Merchant Taylors' Boys School, Merchant Taylors' Girls' School, St Mary's College and Streatham Arts School. There are also several comprehensive schools, including Chesterfield High School, Holy Family Catholic High School, St. Michael's Church of England High School (formerly Manor High Secondary School) and Sacred Heart Catholic College (formerly Sacred Heart Catholic High School, formerly Seafield Grammar School).

== Places of interest ==
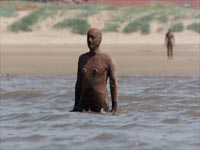
Antony Gormley's Another Place on Crosby Beach

Crosby Beach is home to Antony Gormley's art installation Another Place. The sea views were described in the 19th century by a First Lord of the Admiralty as second only to the Bay of Naples. Crosby's environs include several miles of beach, a marina, a number of parks and a large area of woodland known as Ince Woods. Crosby is home to a now closed Carnegie Library built with donations from the American steel magnate Andrew Carnegie. Distinctive buildings in Crosby Village include the Art Nouveau-inspired Crown Buildings and ten pubs – The Crows Nest, The Birkey, The George, Blues Bar, Frankies, Stamps, Corkscrew, Hampsons and Suburb 24.

In recent years Crosby has featured in The Sunday Times "Best Places to Live" list.

Crosby is also home to Rossett Park Stadium home of Marine A.F.C. who play their football in the National League North. It has a capacity of 2,300 (519 Seated) and is famous for hosting Tottenham Hotspur F.C. in the FA Cup 3rd round in January 2021.

== Transport ==
Crosby is served by the railway stations of Hall Road, Blundellsands and Crosby, and Waterloo, on the Northern Line of the region's commuter rail network, Merseyrail. Trains run between Southport and Hunts Cross via Liverpool Central. Bus services run by Arriva and Stagecoach link the town to Liverpool, Southport and Preston.

== Media ==
Local news and television programmes are provided by BBC North West and ITV Granada. The local television station TalkLiverpool also broadcasts to the area. Television signals are received from the Winter Hill TV transmitter.

Local radio stations are BBC Radio Merseyside, Heart North West, Capital Liverpool, Hits Radio Liverpool, Smooth North West and Greatest Hits Radio Liverpool & The North West.

The town is served by the local newspaper, Liverpool Echo (and also formerly the Crosby Herald).

== Sport ==
Marine AFC (association football) and Waterloo RUFC (rugby union) are both based in the area.

Crosby is also home to Crosby Swimming Club, a member of the Amateur Swimming Association (ASA).

The Northern Club, a multi-sport club featuring cricket, hockey, crown green bowls, squash, racketball and snooker, is situated in the Moor Park area of Crosby.

Crosby Marina is the home of Crosby Sailing Club. The marina is also a venue for the Crosby Scout and Guide Marina Club, who offer dinghy and kayak sailing to local youngsters.

Blundellsands Bridge Club, affiliated to the English Bridge Union, provides facilities for learning and playing rubber bridge and duplicate bridge.

Crosby is home to an Open qualifying venue – West Lancashire Golf Club.

== Notable people ==
- Martyn Andrews (born 1979), television presenter
- Cherie Blair (born 1954), barrister and writer
- Frank Cottrell Boyce (born 1959), screenwriter and novelist
- Kenny Everett (1944–1995), comedian and radio DJ
- Sir Bertram Fox Hayes (1864–1941), sea captain.
- Margaret Irvine (1948–2023), crossword compiler
- J. Bruce Ismay (1862–1937), businessman and Titanic survivor
- Ronnie Moran (1934–2017), Liverpool captain and coach
- Vincent Nichols (born 1945), Catholic cardinal
- John Parrott (born 1964), professional snooker player
- Joe Periton (1901–1980), rugby union player
- Anne Robinson (born 1944), television presenter and journalist
- Robert Runcie (1921–2000), Anglican bishop
- Laurie Taylor (born 1936), sociologist and radio presenter

== See also ==
- Congregational Church, Great Crosby
