= St Luke's Church, Great Crosby =

Coordinates: 53.4910°N 3.0241°W

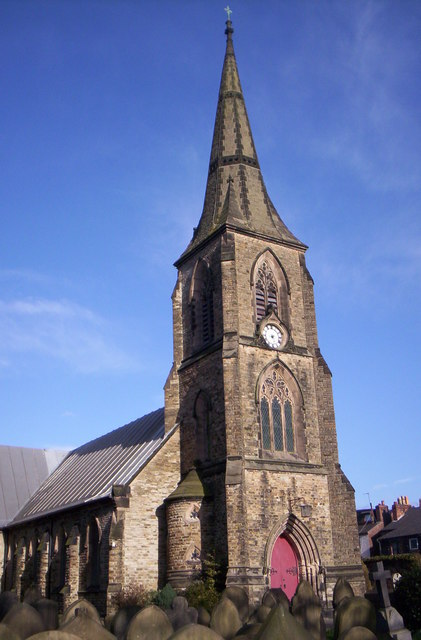
- St Luke's Church, Great Crosby, from the northwest

- Location in Merseyside
- OS grid reference: SJ 322 999
- Location: Liverpool Road, Great Crosby, Sefton, Merseyside
- Country: England
- Denomination: Anglican
- Website: St Luke, Great Crosby

History
- Status: Parish church
- Dedication: Saint Luke
- Consecrated: 26 December 1853

Architecture
- Functional status: Active
- Heritage designation: Grade II
- Designated: 20 December 1996
- Architect(s): A. and G. Holme
- Architectural type: Church
- Style: Gothic Revival (Decorated)
- Groundbreaking: 1853
- Completed: 1854

Specifications
- Materials: Sandstone, steel roof

Administration
- Province: York
- Diocese: Liverpool
- Archdeaconry: Liverpool
- Deanery: Sefton
- Parish: St Luke, Great Crosby

Clergy
- Vicar: Revd Amanda Bruce

St Luke's Church is on Liverpool Road, near the centre of Great Crosby, Sefton, Merseyside, England. It is an active Anglican parish church in the diocese of Liverpool. The church is recorded in the National Heritage List for England as a designated Grade II listed building. The east end of the church was rebuilt following a fire in 1972.

== History ==
St Luke's Church was built in 1853–54 and designed by A. and G. Holme. The foundation stone was laid by John Myers, a benefactor of the church, in 1853, and the church was consecrated on 26 December of that year by the Rt Revd John Graham, bishop of Chester. In 1864 a clock by Thomas Cooke, and a ring of six bells by Mears Whitechapel Foundry were installed in the tower. A new baptistry was created in 1888, when the font was moved to the back of the church, the choir stalls were moved into the chancel, and a new lectern was provided. Further alterations were made to the front of the church in 1969. On the evening of 9 June 1972 the east end of the church was badly damaged by fire. It was rebuilt by Saunders Boston, who added a new steel roof, a new apse, and three new vestries in the Modernist style. The rebuilt church was dedicated on 13 April 1975 the Rt Revd John Bickersteth, bishop of Warrington.

== Architecture ==
=== Exterior ===
The church is built in coursed sandstone rubble with freestone dressings and a steel roof. Its architectural style is Decorated. The plan consists of a wide four-bay nave without aisles, a south porch, north and south two-bay transepts, a chancel, and a west steeple. The steeple is 120 feet (36.6 m) high. This has a three-stage tower with full-height diagonal buttresses, and a single-stage circular stair turret. On the west side of the tower, the bottom stage contains an arched doorway with a hood mould, in the middle stage there is a three-light window, and in the top stage are a clock face on the west side and two-light louvred bell openings on all sides. On top of the tower is a broach spire, which is swept at the foot. The bays of the nave and the transepts contain two-light arched windows. Extending from the apse of the chancel are the three vestries added by Saunders Boston.

=== Interior ===
Inside the church, the box pews that had been damaged in the fire were replaced by pitch pine pews moved from St Benedict's Church, Everton, which has been demolished. The holy table and credence table survived the fire; they had been coated with a fire-proofing substance. On the front of the gallery is a royal coat of arms of William IV. The stained glass in the windows of the transepts was restored after the fire. Most of these windows are by Capronnier, and they depict biblical scenes. The glass in the windows of the nave is plain. The two-manual pipe organ was made by Walker's, and dates from the 1970s. There is a ring of six bells cast in 1863 by George Mears and Company; the tenor weighs 1,382 pounds (627 kg) and has a diameter of 26 inches (0.66 m).

== Appraisal ==
The church was designated as a Grade II listed building on 20 December 1996. Grade II is the lowest of the three grades of listing and is applied to buildings that are "nationally important and of special interest".

St Luke's is an active parish church in the deanery of Sefton, the archdeaconry of Liverpool, and the diocese of Liverpool.

== See also ==
- Listed buildings in Great Crosby
