= Old Christ Church, Waterloo =

Coordinates: 53.4709°N 3.0237°W

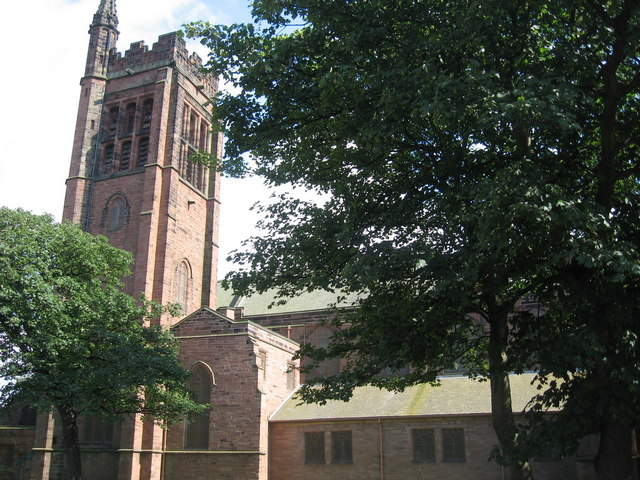
- Old Christ Church, Waterloo, from the north

- Location in Merseyside
- OS grid reference: SJ 321,976
- Location: Waterloo Road, Waterloo, Merseyside
- Country: England
- Denomination: Anglican
- Website: Official website

History
- Dedicated: April 1893
- Consecrated: 2 December 1899

Architecture
- Functional status: Redundant
- Heritage designation: Grade II*
- Designated: 4 July 1952
- Architect: Paley, Austin and Paley
- Architectural type: Church
- Style: Gothic Revival (Perpendicular)
- Groundbreaking: 1891
- Completed: 1899
- Construction cost: £21,956
- Closed: 1982

Specifications
- Materials: Sandstone, Westmorland slate roofs

Old Christ Church is a redundant Anglican church located in Waterloo Road, Waterloo, Merseyside, England. The church is recorded in the National Heritage List for England as a designated Grade II* listed building, and is under the care of the Churches Conservation Trust. It was declared redundant in 1982, and its functions have been replaced by a new Christ Church at the junction of Crosby Road South and Alexandra Road, Waterloo.

== Early history ==
Christ Church was built between 1891 and 1899 to replace a former church built in 1840 whose structure had become unsound. The foundation stone was laid on 17 October 1891, the nave and baptistry were built between 1891 and 1893, and the chancel was added the following year. In 1899 the tower was built. A competition was held to select the architect, but this failed to find an acceptable design, and the commission was given to the Lancaster firm of Paley, Austin and Paley. The contractors were George Woods and Sons of Bootle, and the church cost £21,956 (equivalent to £520,000 in 2025). The church was dedicated in April 1893, and on 2 December 1899 it was consecrated by Bishop Royston, an assistant bishop in the Diocese of Liverpool.

== Architecture ==
The architectural historians Pollard and Pevsner in the Buildings of England series express the opinion that this is one of the "very finest" churches designed by the firm of Paley, Austin and Paley. The church is constructed in Old Red Sandstone from Bootle quarry, and is roofed with green Westmorland slates. Its plan consists of a five-bay nave with north and south aisles and a clerestory, a chancel with a south chapel and a north transept, and a northeast tower with vestries to its east. At the west end is a polygonal baptistry, and porches have been incorporated into the west ends of the aisles. The nave measures 96 feet (29 m) by 29.5 feet (9 m), the aisles are 14 feet (4 m) wide, the chancel is 40.5 feet (12 m) by 30 feet (9 m), and the south chapel measures 41 feet (12 m) by 24 feet (7 m). The architectural style is mainly Perpendicular, and there are elements of Decorated style (in the tracery of the west window), and Art Nouveau style (above doorways and in the aisle windows).

The west front is symmetrical with angle buttresses, and contains a tall six-light window. Above the window is a gable containing two ogee-headed niches and a small lancet window. The gable is decorated with chequerwork and on its apex is a stone cross. The baptistry protrudes outwards below the west window. It has two-light square-headed windows, angle buttresses and a moulded parapet. Flanking the baptistry are gabled porches over which are two-light windows at the ends of the aisles. Along the walls of the aisles are two two-light windows in each bay, except for the east bay on the south side which has one window and a small door leading into the chapel. The north transept has a transomed north window and a square-headed window on its west side. On the walls of the clerestory are three-light windows in each bay.

The chancel roof is at a slightly lower level than that of the nave, and it has a cross on its gable apex. Between the chancel and the nave on the south side is a turret containing the stairs leading to the walkways behind the parapets. The east window in the chancel is large, with seven lights, and the chapel has a five-light east window. The south wall of the chancel has two bays, each containing a pair of two-light square-headed windows.

The tower is in three stages with string courses separating the stages. At its corners are angle buttresses. The middle stage is divided internally into two floors. At the northeast corner of the tower is an octagonal stair turret containing a spiral staircase. The turret rises to a higher level than the tower, and is surmounted by a crocketted stone spirelet. The bottom stage of the tower has a three-light window in the north wall. The middle stage contains an arched two-light window in the west wall and a similar window at a higher level in the north wall. Each wall of the top stage contains a three-light transomed square-headed bell opening. The parapet is double-stepped and is carved with the Latin phrases Laus Deo (praise be to God) and Laudate Dominum (praise the Lord) in Gothic script. On top of the tower is a pyramidal roof.

Internally, all the fittings were removed after the church became redundant. The striated stonework is exposed. The arcades between the nave and the aisles are carried on cylindrical pillars. In the south wall of the chancel are three sedilia and a credence shelf. Most of the church is floored with stone flags, but in the chancel are red, green, black and yellow decorated tiles. Some of the stained glass was moved into this church from the older church, but most of it is by Shrigley and Hunt. The glass in the east window depicts the Te Deum and the west window contains the Twelve Apostles.

== External features ==
The sandstone boundary wall and the gates to the churchyard are listed at Grade II. They are contemporary with the church and were probably designed by the same architects. The gates are in wrought iron.

== Recent history and present day ==
During the second half of the 20th century, the size of the congregation had fallen to a low level and in 1982 the church was declared redundant. The condition of its fabric deteriorated due to neglect and vandalism, and in 1993 it was planned to demolish it. However, following a public enquiry, it was decided that it should be conserved. In 1998 it was vested in the Churches Conservation Trust. A group known as The Friends of Old Christ Church has been formed to raise money for the improvement of the facilities provided by the church building and to encourage its use by the community. It is possible to arrange visits to the church, and it is available for hiring. Events and activities are organised in the church.

== See also ==
- Grade II* listed buildings in Merseyside
- Listed buildings in Great Crosby
- List of works by Paley, Austin and Paley
- List of churches preserved by the Churches Conservation Trust in Northern England
