= Brighton-le-Sands, Merseyside =

Coordinates: 53.4815°N 3.0343°W

Brighton-le-Sands
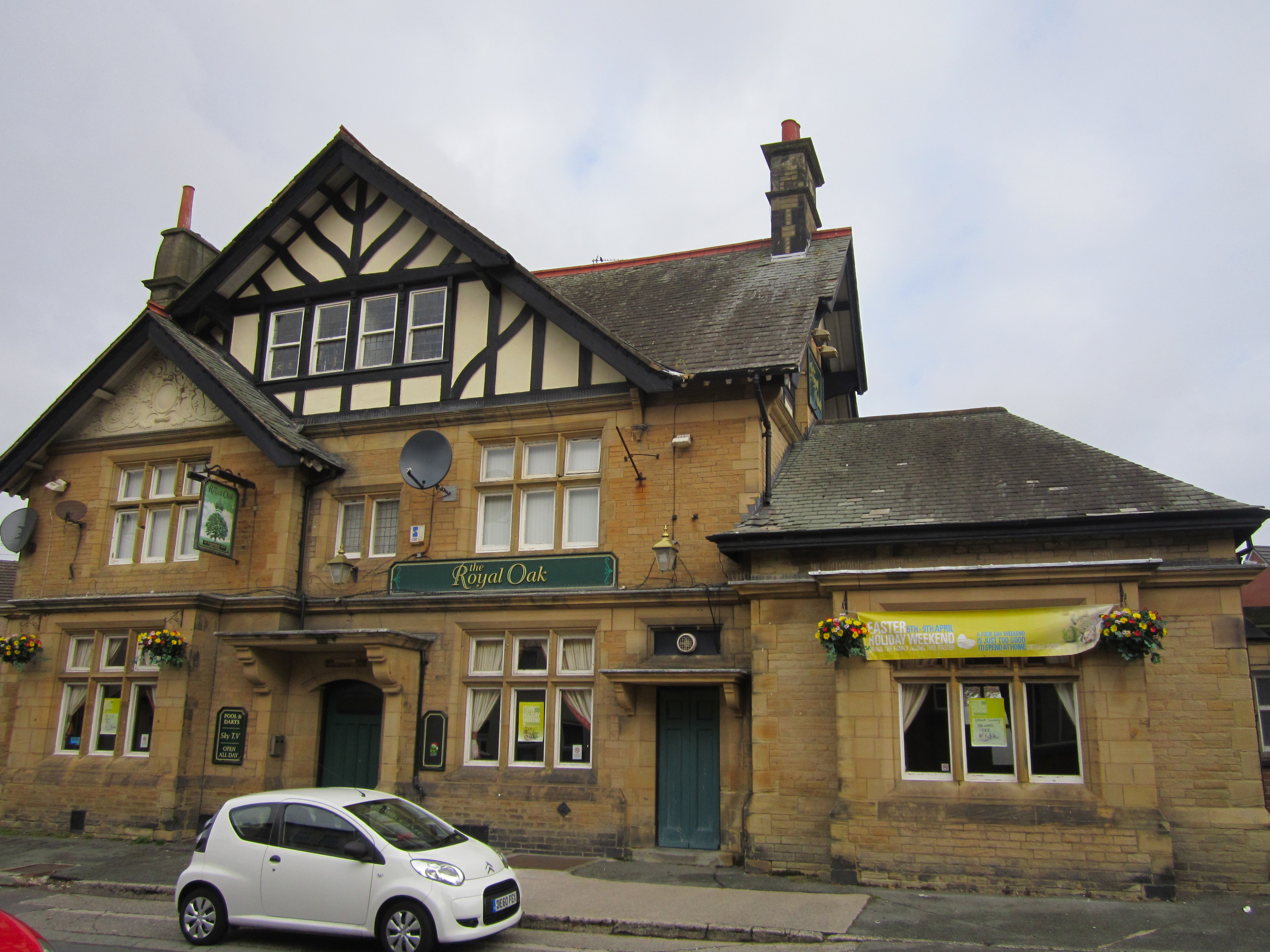
- Royal Oak public house, Brighton-le-Sands

- Location within Merseyside
- OS grid reference: SJ304990
- Metropolitan borough: Sefton
- Metropolitan county: Merseyside
- Region: North West
- Country: England
- Sovereign state: United Kingdom
- Post town: LIVERPOOL
- Postcode district: L22 / L23
- Dialling code: 0151
- Police: Merseyside
- Fire: Merseyside
- Ambulance: North West
- UK Parliament: Sefton Central

Brighton-le-Sands is an area of Merseyside, England, in the borough of Sefton. It is located close to Crosby, situated between Blundellsands to the north, Waterloo to the south and Great Crosby to the east.

Crosby Beach, the site of Anthony Gormley's Another Place statues, borders the area to the west. Several of the streets in Brighton-le-Sands are, like the area itself, named after locations in Sussex; including Hastings, Worthing and Eastbourne.

== Governance ==
From 1950 until 2010 Brighton-le-Sands was within the boundaries of the Crosby constituency, whose MP from 1997 till 2010 was Claire Curtis-Thomas, a member of the Labour Party. Prior to her election the Crosby seat was generally considered to be a safe Conservative Party stronghold with Tory MP's elected at every election barring the 1981 Crosby by-election where Shirley Williams of the Social Democratic Party was elected to represent the constituency.

As a result of boundary revisions for the 2010 general election the Crosby constituency was abolished with its northern parts, including Brighton-le-Sands, being merged with the eastern parts of Sefton (formerly part of the Knowsley North and Sefton East constituency) to form the new constituency of Sefton Central. Since its inception this constituency has been represented by the Labour Party MP Bill Esterson.

For elections to Sefton Council Brighton-le-Sands is situated in the electoral ward of Blundellsands, with all three councillors representing the area coming from the Labour Party.
