= Great Crosby =

Coordinates: 53.4929°N 3.0224°W

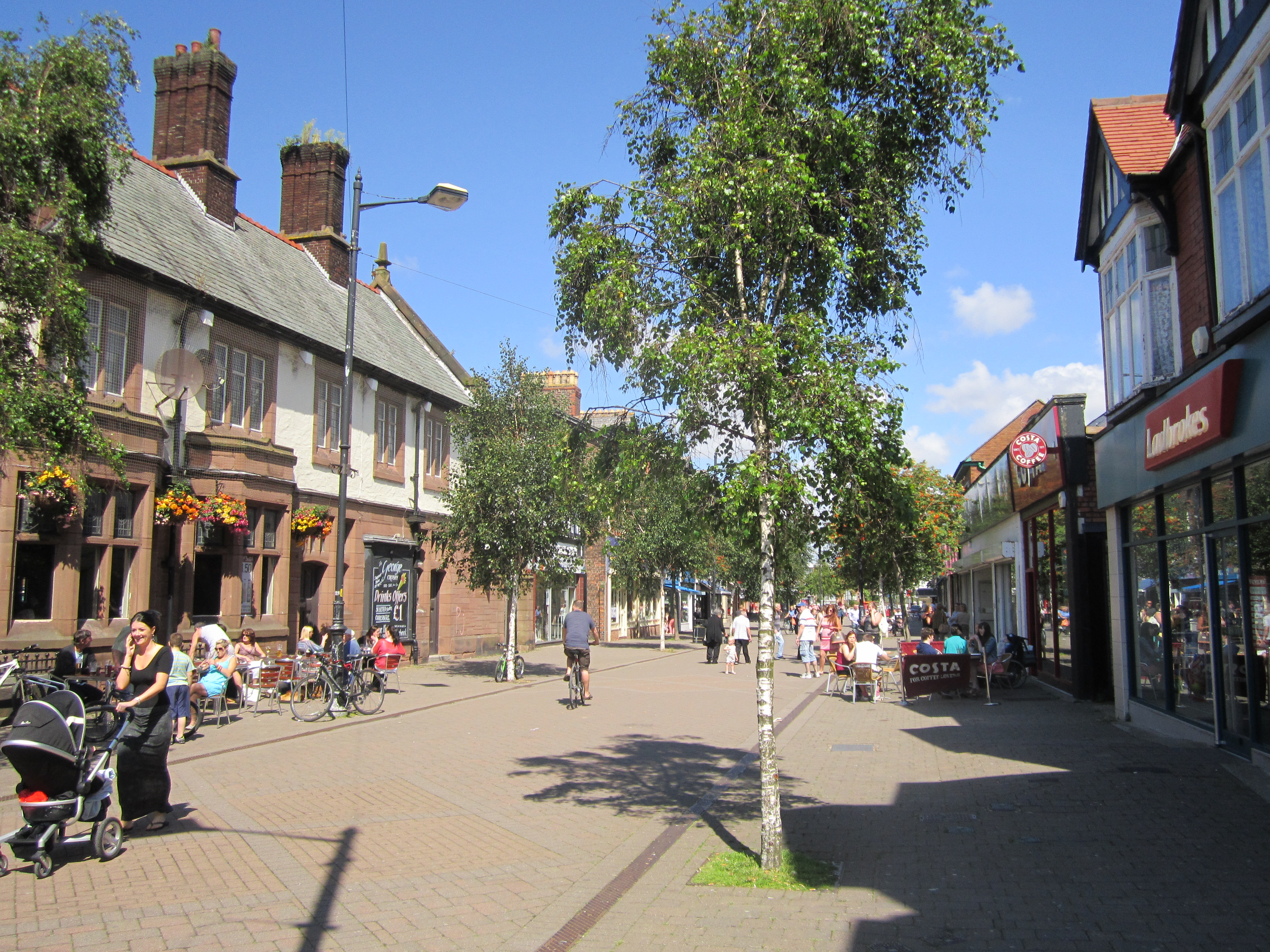
- Moor Lane, Great Crosby

- Location within Merseyside
- OS grid reference: SJ326989
- Metropolitan borough: Sefton
- Metropolitan county: Merseyside
- Region: North West
- Country: England
- Sovereign state: United Kingdom
- Post town: LIVERPOOL
- Postcode district: L23
- Dialling code: 0151
- Police: Merseyside
- Fire: Merseyside
- Ambulance: North West
- UK Parliament: Bootle; Sefton Central

Great Crosby is an area of the town of Crosby, in the Metropolitan Borough of Sefton, Merseyside, England and is historically, part of Lancashire.

== Location ==
In 1907, the Victoria County History described Great Crosby's location thus: 'The ancient township of Great Crosby, which includes Waterloo, lies on the northern shore of the estuary of the Mersey, with a level sandy beach extending over three miles (5 km) from north-west to southeast; it stretches inland some two miles (3 km), and has an area of 2,168 acres (8.77 km^{2}), of which 1,907 acres (7.72 km^{2}) belong to the present diminished township. The village, which lies more than a mile inland, is becoming modernized and growing quickly, especially along the principal road, that from Liverpool to Southport, which crosses the township in a northerly direction, with roads branching off to the shore and to Thornton. The Liverpool and Southport line of the Lancashire and Yorkshire Railway, opened in 1848, with stations at Waterloo and Blundellsands, also passes through the township. An electric tramway connects Great Crosby with the Seaforth terminus of the Liverpool Overhead Railway.'

== History ==
Great Crosby was a small village of Viking origin until the arrival of the railway in the 1840s. The village grew rapidly during the late 19th and early 20th century and merged with a number of distinct areas with their own character, to form the Great Crosby urban district. These areas included:

- Crosby Village, the main area for shopping, pubs and restaurants
- Blundellsands, a middle class residential area close to the seafront
- Brighton-le-Sands
- Thornton, a residential area of semi-detached and detached housing which dates mainly from the 1930s.

Great Crosby was formerly a chapelry in the parish of Sephton, in 1866 Great Crosby became a separate civil parish, in 1894 Great Crosby became an urban district, the urban district annexed Little Crosby in 1932. On 9 November 1937, the district was combined with the Waterloo with Seaforth urban district to form the municipal borough of Crosby, On 1 April 1974 the parish was abolished and it became part of the new Metropolitan Borough of Sefton. In 1951 the parish had a population of 26,982. These boundary changes defined the town of Crosby in its modern borders and shrank down the modern area of Great Crosby from the old urban district, making it an area of the modern town of Crosby which today is a separate area of Crosby to Blundellsands, Brighton-le-Sands, and Thornton.

== Amenities ==
Great Crosby has three fee-paying schools (Merchant Taylors' Boys' School, Merchant Taylors' Girls' School, St Mary's College), a number of state schools (including Sacred Heart Catholic College) and parks facing the sea. In nearby Waterloo there is a cinema, the Plaza Community Cinema, which is run by volunteers.

In the past, Crosby had five cinemas: the Corona, and the Regent were in the northern part of the district. The Corona, almost opposite the Library, in College Road, was part of the Gaumont chain, and after merging with the Rank Organisation became a second-run house, as Rank already had taken over the Plaza in Waterloo, which became an Odeon and had the first run policy. The Corona played the Bill Hayley film 'Rock Around The Clock' just before the cinema closed in 1957 and demolished before the end of that decade. Waterloo had two independent cinemas, the Queens on South Road and the Winter Gardens in Church Road. The Queens closed in the late fifties, and the Winter Gardens closed nearly ten years later.

Another cinema in the Great Crosby area was the Regent on Liverpool Road at the junction of Endbutt Lane; it became part of the ABC group, closed in 1967 to become a bingo hall, and has since become part of St. Mary's College. Land had been purchased in Crosby Village, across the road from the Crown Buildings, to be redeveloped into a Super Cinema. This never happened due to the onset of World War II. By the time building restrictions were lifted in the mid-1950s, cinema admissions were in decline. The land remained derelict until the 1960s when the Midland Bank and Satterthwaite's shop, amongst others, were built on the site.

Above the College Road shops, from the Corona Cinema to the corner with Brompton Avenue, was the Corona Ballroom, mostly used for ballroom dancing. The entrance to the ballroom was in Brompton Avenue. Another musical venue was St. Lukes Church Hall on Liverpool Road, where regular Saturday night dances were held.

Alexandra Hall, completed in 1888 and situated at the junction of Mersey Road, College Road and Coronation Road was originally the Town Hall for the Crosby Urban District Council. When the Great Crosby and Waterloo with Seaforth Urban Districts were merged into the Borough of Crosby, the council offices were transferred to Waterloo Town Hall. The frontage of the red brick Alexandra Hall had an ironwork and glass canopy, which was removed in the late 1950s because of rust erosion. Alexandra Hall played host to The Beatles, before they became superstars, in January 1961. The Crosby Flower Show and local drama groups used the Main Hall upstairs each year. In the 1970s the building was converted into Law Courts, and survived to the Millennium. In 2004 the building was demolished and replaced by residential apartments.

A private park, known locally as the 'Key Park', consists of 60 acres (240,000 m^{2}) of unspoilt land in Warren Road, Blundellsands. Members pay a subscription, and are given a key.

Set in the Moor Park area, close to the heart of the old village, is the Northern Club, a multi-sporting club.

In College Road is the ground and club house for Marine Football Club. Also worthy of note is Waterloo R.F.C., with their ground in St. Anthony's Road.

== Transport ==
Residents can commute to Liverpool or Southport either by car, by bus or by train from Blundellsands & Crosby and Hall Road stations, located on the Northern Line of the Merseyrail network.

The Liverpool Overhead Railway opened in 1893, and to attract more custom, built a street tramway from their terminus at Seaforth Sands railway station, along Crosby Road South, Crosby Road North and Liverpool Road to terminate at the junction of Cooks Road and Victoria Road in the centre of Great Crosby. The tramway started in 1900 and had a 25 years lease; when this was due to expire Liverpool Corporation had shown interest in operating a service into Crosby; talks broke down at a late stage, and the Waterloo and Crosby Motor Services took on the route for bus operation, later taken over by Ribble Motor Services to become the L9.

Before 1932, Ribble Motor Services acquired the small local bus operators, including Waterloo and Crosby Motor Services (Ribble Timetables Area 4 1932). In 1936 Ribble opened a bus station on Little Crosby Road; this was very basic being a plot of land with a turning circle - passengers waited for their bus in a central waiting area which was open to the elements. Buses operated anti-clockwise round the waiting area.

Ribble monopolised the services in the district and their L1, L2, L3, L4, L5, L6, L7, L8, L9, L11, L15, L20, L30, L50, L60, L80, L90, S1, S2 and S3 services served the district. The L3 was Ribble's most frequent service linking Great Crosby with Liverpool Skelhorne Street; the service was also used for trials of new vehicles, and demonstrators. Once a year the S23 operated from Crosby Bus Station to Aintree Old Roan in connection with the Grand National; this service fell into decline and ceased in the early sixties. As traffic congestion grew in the early 1960s, the Ribble services began to suffer reliability problems. Ribble introduced two local services C1 and C2 using single deck vehicles in 1968. In January 1972, Ribble signed an agency agreement with Merseyside Passenger Transport Executive which gave the PTE control of all bus services in Crosby. In November 1974, PTE route 92 was introduced between Hall Road Station and Huyton. The Executive opened the Waterloo Interchange in January 1977, all local bus services were timed to connect with Merseyrail services to and from Liverpool.

The Liverpool to Southport railway line provided a link to Liverpool Exchange railway station, serving the business sector of the city. The line was listed in Dr. Beeching's Report for closure in 1962, as requiring extra sets of trains for peak hour use only was costly. Merseyside Passenger Transport Executive recognised the needs of the line, and supported improvements to the service and stations, including diverting the line under the city centre (and so closing Liverpool Exchange, replaced by Moorfields railway station) and onward to Hunts Cross, and the line has survived.

The Southport to Liverpool line also had a through service to London Euston on weekdays, when a steam hauled train, generally of two or three carriages, would call at selected stations on the line including Blundellsands & Crosby and Waterloo. The train would leave the line after Bootle Oriel Road, to take the line round the city to join the main line into Lime Street. The through coaches were discontinued in 1966 when the Liverpool Lime Street to London Euston line converted to electric powered locomotives from steam power.

To compensate for this loss of amenity, British Rail introduced a diesel multiple unit service between Southport Chapel Street and Liverpool Lime Street. Generally five trains a day ran on weekdays. This service operated until Liverpool Exchange Station closed in 1977, when the trains from Southport were diverted, proceeding under the city to Liverpool Central Low Level.

== Disasters ==
In 1926 the erosion of the sand dunes near The Serpentine, brought the sides of several large houses down. The River Alt at Formby and Hightown were a major cause to the erosion of the banks of the River Mersey at Crosby. The sea moving ever closer, brought about the total demolition of the residences. Over the years since the erosion, the site has become a promenade for walkers, with a car park with a view.

== Notable residents ==
Famous residents of Crosby have included:

- Performer and Broadcaster Martyn Andrews
- Titanic Captain Edward Smith
- Sociologist and Broadcaster Laurie Taylor
- Academic, Writer and Egyptologist Thomas Eric Peet
- Composer Sir Simon Rattle
- Writer Helen Forrester
- Broadcaster Kenny Everett
- TV Presenter Anne Robinson
- Mezzo Soprano Danielle Louise Thomas
- Footballer Kenny Dalglish
- Footballer Steve McManaman
- Footballer Jamie Carragher
- Footballer Georginio Wijnaldum
- Footballer Carlo Ancelotti
- Footballer Richarlison
- Footballer Diogo Jota
- Footballer Luis Diaz

== See also ==
- Listed buildings in Great Crosby
