= Listed buildings in Blundellsands =

Blundellsands is an area in Sefton, Merseyside, England. It contains six buildings that are recorded in the National Heritage List for England as designated listed buildings, all of which are listed at Grade II. This grade is the lowest of the three gradings given to listed buildings and is applied to "buildings of national importance and special interest".

The area was created as a suburb for wealthy businessmen from Liverpool by the Blundell family of Crosby Hall in the middle of the 19th century. The listed buildings consist of domestic properties, two churches, and a drinking fountain.

Name and location	Photograph	Date	Notes
Sandford; 53.48584°N 3.04285°W	—	Before 1865	A three-storey villa in eclectic style. The ground floor is in ashlar, and above this the house is in brick with stone dressings and a hipped slate roof. It has a symmetrical front with five bays, the outer bays projecting slightly forward. In the centre is a large round-headed doorway with an architrave and a keystone. Most of the windows are sashes.
18, 20 and 22 Warren Road and Treleaven House; 53.48619°N 3.04177°W	—	1867	A row of four houses in eclectic High Victorian Gothic style, built in red brick with polychrome bands, and with steep hipped slate roofs. They are in three storeys, and consist of a main range, with Treleaven House forming a cross-wing at the left and including a four-stage tower. The windows are sashes.
Conservatory, Glencaple; 53.49032°N 3.04608°W	—	Late 19th century	The conservatory, attached to the house, is in wood and glass on a plinth, and was designed by Herbert Rowse. It has a square plan and is in Classical style, symmetrical with three bays. It contains Tuscan columns, a frieze, a cornice, and a doorway with a pilastered architrave.
St Nicholas' Fountain; 53.49244°N 3.05425°W		1881	A public drinking fountain built in sandstone, standing on a polished granite base. It has a square plan and there is a bowl on each side. Around the base is a biblical inscription.
St Joseph's Church; 53.48902°N 3.04507°W		1885–86	A Roman Catholic church by A. E. Purdie in Early English style. It is in sandstone with slate roofs. The church consists of a nave and a chancel with a clerestory, and north and south aisles, At the west end of the north aisle is a porch and a turret, and at the west end of the south aisle is a diagonal porch and an apsidal chapel.
United Reformed Church; 53.48883°N 3.04624°W		1898–1905	Originally a Presbyterian church, later a United Reformed Church, it was designed by W. G. Fraser and A. Thornely in free Perpendicular style. The church is built in sandstone and has a green slate roof. It consists of a nave, a short chancel, transepts, a flèche, and a northeast tower with a stair turret. The tower is in three stages with angle buttresses, a west doorway, and a pierced and stepped embattled parapet.
