= Crosby United Reformed Church =

Coordinates: 53.4875°N 3.0343°W

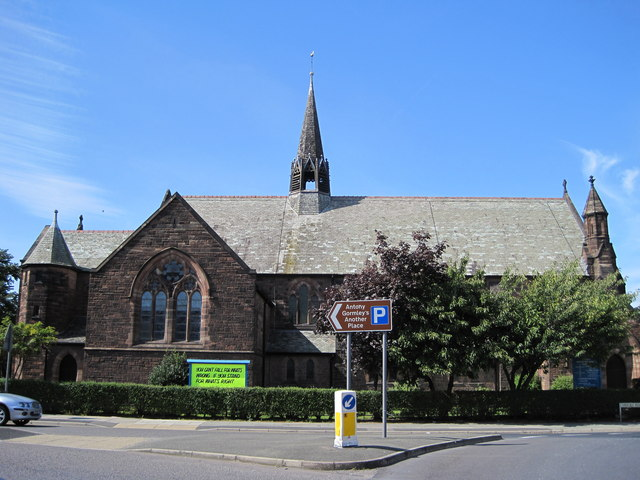
- Crosby United Reformed Church

- Location in Merseyside
- OS grid reference: SJ 321 999
- Location: Great Crosby, Merseyside
- Country: England
- Denomination: United Reformed Church
- Website: Crosby United Reformed Church

History
- Former name: Great Crosby Congregational Church
- Status: Church
- Founded: 1885

Architecture
- Functional status: Active
- Heritage designation: Grade II
- Designated: 26 March 1973
- Architect: Douglas & Fordham
- Architectural type: Church
- Style: Gothic Revival
- Groundbreaking: 1897
- Completed: 1898

Specifications
- Materials: Sandstone, green slate roofs

Crosby United Reformed Church, originally Great Crosby Congregational Church, is on the corner of Eshe Road and Mersey Road in Great Crosby, a suburb of Liverpool, Merseyside, England. It is recorded in the National Heritage List for England as a designated Grade II listed building. It is an active congregation of the United Reformed Church. The authors of the Buildings of England series, referring to the architecture of the church, say "The whole is very satisfying".

== History ==
The church was founded in 1885 and initially met in a schoolroom. On 22 May 1897 the foundation stone for the present church was laid and the first service was held on 15 September 1898. The church was designed by Douglas and Fordham and it was attached to the schoolroom. In 1972 it became a United Reformed Church.

== Architecture ==
=== Exterior ===
The church is built in snecked red sandstone with green slate roofs in Gothic style. Its plan consists of a nave, low north and south aisles, a southeast porch, large north and south transepts, a west chancel, and a southwest choir vestry with the organ-house above it. Over the nave is a flèche. The windows are lancets, apart from larger windows in the north transept and at the west end. The latter window is flanked by corner buttresses, each of which is surmounted by an octagonal turret. To the north the church is linked to a large gabled hall which was originally the schoolroom.

=== Interior ===
The roof is a hammerbeam. The reredos consists of a First World War memorial dated 1920 with gesso work by Joseph Lawton. Forming part of this memorial is the glass in the east window which is by Shrigley and Hunt. In the north aisle two windows contain stained glass by Edward Frampton.

== See also ==
- Listed buildings in Great Crosby
- List of new churches by John Douglas
