= Victoria (Sefton ward) =

Coordinates: 53.4929°N 3.0224°W

Victoria is a Metropolitan Borough of Sefton ward in the Bootle Parliamentary constituency that covers the locality of Great Crosby. The population of this ward at the 2011 census was 13,252.

== Councillors ==
Term	Councillor	Party
1987–2012	Anthony Hill	Liberal Democrats
1988–2002, 2006–2014	Andrew Tonkiss	Liberal Democrats
2006–2011	Peter Hough	Liberal Democrats
2011 – present	Leslie Byrom C.B.E.	Labour
2012 – present	Michael Roche	Labour
2014 – present	Jan Grace	Labour

== Election results ==
=== Elections of the 2020s ===
Sefton Metropolitan Borough Council Municipal Elections 2021: Victoria
Party	Candidate	Votes	%	±%
Labour	Michael Roche	2141	53%	
Liberal Democrats	Hannah Jane Gee	1139	28%	
Conservative	Michael Crichton	440	11%	
Green	Neil Anthony Doolin	321	8%	
Majority		1002	25%	
Turnout		4041	37%	
Labour hold		Swing		

=== Elections of the 2010s ===
Sefton Metropolitan Borough Council Municipal Elections 2019: Victoria
Party	Candidate	Votes	%	±%
Labour	Leslie Byrom C.B.E.	1675	48%	
Liberal Democrats	Hannah Gee	1003	29%	
Green	Andrew Roy Donegan	427	12%	
Conservative	Paul Martyn Barber	351	10%	
Majority		672	19%	
Turnout		3456	32%	
Labour hold		Swing		

Sefton Metropolitan Borough Council Municipal Elections 2018: Victoria
Party	Candidate	Votes	%	±%
Labour	Janet Grace	2369	65%	
Liberal Democrats	Hannah Gee	665	18%	
Conservative	Paul Martyn Barber	469	13%	
Green	Andrew Roy Donegan	163	4%	
Majority		1704	47%	
Turnout		3666	34%	
Labour hold		Swing		

Sefton Metropolitan Borough Council Municipal Elections 2016: Victoria
Party	Candidate	Votes	%	±%
Labour	Michael Roche	2030	61%	
Liberal Democrats	Carol Tonkiss	413	12%	
Conservative	Paul Martyn Barber	394	12%	
UKIP	Joseph Graeme Hedgecock	315	9%	
Green	Andrew Roy Donegan	193	6%	
Majority		1617	49%	
Turnout		3345	33%	
Labour hold		Swing		

Sefton Metropolitan Borough Council Municipal Elections 2015: Victoria
Party	Candidate	Votes	%	±%
Labour	Leslie Byrom C.B.E.	4237	55%	
Conservative	Paul Martyn Barber	1191	16%	
Liberal Democrats	Andrew Tonkiss	925	12%	
UKIP	Joseph Graeme Hedgecock	694	9%	
Green	Andrew Roy Donegan	632	8%	
Majority		3046	39%	
Turnout		7679	73%	
Labour hold		Swing		

Sefton Metropolitan Borough Council Municipal Elections 2014: Victoria
Party	Candidate	Votes	%	±%
Labour	Jan Grace	1,691	45%	
Liberal Democrats	Andrew Tonkiss	849	22%	
UKIP	Jack Colbert	669	18%	
Conservative	Simon Jamieson	340	9%	
Green	Julia Thorne	250	7%	
Majority		842	23%	
Turnout		3799	38%	
Labour gain from Liberal Democrats		Swing		

Sefton Metropolitan Borough Council Municipal Elections 2012: Victoria
Party	Candidate	Votes	%	±%
Labour	Michael Roche	2114	59%	
Liberal Democrats	Jack Colbert	889	25%	
Conservative	Paul Martyn Barber	329	9%	
UKIP	Mike Neale Kelly	267	7%	
Majority		1225	34%	
Turnout		3599	36%	
Labour gain from Liberal Democrats		Swing		

Sefton Metropolitan Borough Council Municipal Elections 2011: Victoria
Party	Candidate	Votes	%	±%
Labour	Leslie Byrom C.B.E.	2258	49%	
Liberal Democrats	Peter Hough	1442	32%	
Conservative	Sharon Hutchinson	575	13%	−4%
UKIP	Michael Neale Kelly	289	6%	+2%
Majority		816	18%	
Turnout		4564	45%	
Labour gain from Liberal Democrats		Swing		

Sefton Metropolitan Borough Council Municipal Elections 2010: Victoria
Party	Candidate	Votes	%	±%
Liberal Democrats	Andrew Tonkiss	2959	40%	
Labour	Gemma Schneider	2811	38%	
Conservative	Sharon Hutchinson	1226	17%	
UKIP	Michael Neale Kelly	334	5%	
Majority		148	2%	
Turnout		7330	72%	
Liberal Democrats hold		Swing		

=== Elections of the 2000s ===
Sefton Metropolitan Borough Council Municipal Elections 2008: Victoria
Party	Candidate	Votes	%	±%
Labour	Giles Robert Blundell	762	21%	
Liberal Democrats	Anthony Hill	2029	56%	
Conservative	Sharon Hutchinson	646	18%	
UKIP	Mike Neale Kelly	205	6%	
Majority		1267	34%	
Turnout		3652	35%	
Liberal Democrats hold		Swing		

Sefton Metropolitan Borough Council Municipal Elections 2007: Victoria
Party	Candidate	Votes	%	±%
Labour	Giles Robert Blundell	1240	36%	
Liberal Democrats	Peter Andrew Hough	1432	41%	
Conservative	Sharon Hutchinson	577	17%	
UKIP	Mike Neale Kelly	212	6%	
Majority		192	6%	
Turnout		3473	34%	
Liberal Democrats hold		Swing		
