= Merchant Taylors' Boys' School, Crosby =

Coordinates: 53.484°N 3.025°W

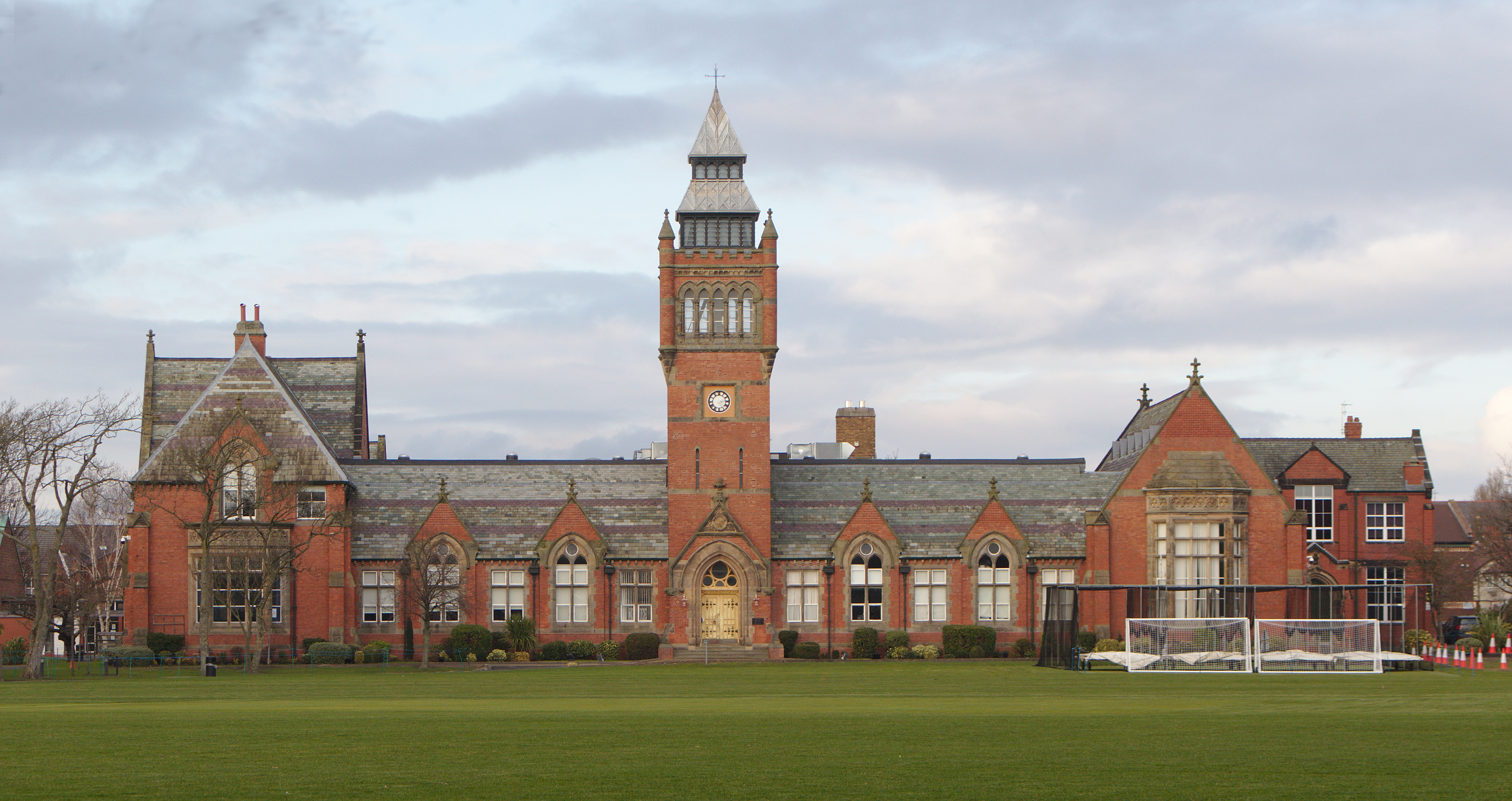
- Merchant Taylors main building

Location
- 186 Liverpool Road; Great Crosby, Merseyside, L23 0QP; England

Information
- Type: 4-18 Girls and Boys Independent day school Public School
- Motto: Latin: Concordia parvae res crescunt ("Small things grow in harmony" - Sallust)
- Established: 1620; 406 years ago
- Founder: Merchant Taylors' Company
- Local authority: Sefton
- Department for Education URN: 104973 Tables
- Head Teacher: Mr Philip Dearden
- Staff: ~80 (full-time)
- Gender: Girls and Boys
- Age: 4 to 18
- Enrolment: 737
- Houses: Mantels, lions, camels, lambs
- Colour
- Alumni: Old Crosbeians
- School Song: Crescat Crosbeia
- Website: Merchant Taylors' Boys School

Merchant Taylors' Boys' School, Crosby is a 7–18 boys private day school, located in Great Crosby on Merseyside. The school's motto is that of the Worshipful Company of Merchant Taylors: Concordia Parvae Res Crescunt (Small Things Grow in Harmony).

From September 2025, Merchant Taylors' Girls' School will join Merchant Taylors’ Boys’ School to create a co-educational senior school. The newly created school will be known as Merchant Taylors’ School and will be co-educational for all pupils aged 4–18.

== History ==
=== Establishment ===
The school was founded in 1620 under the instruction of the estate of John Harrison, a citizen and Merchant Taylor of London, who was born in Great Crosby, and was run under the auspices of the Merchant Taylors' Company until 1910. In 1878, the school moved to its present site, some 1,000 yards from the previous, which now forms part of the Merchant Taylors' Girls' School, with whom the school shares a Governing Board and Bursar.

The first schoolmaster was the Revd John Kidde, who was also at the time the ‘Minister of Crosby’ and a farmer of 3 acres (12,000 m^{2}) to support his family of eight children. Kidde was apparently sacked from the post in 1651 on the grounds of mismanagement, although it is thought he was forced out by Roman Catholic sympathizers on account of his Puritan/Presbyterian ways.

=== Boarding school ===
Until 1984, Merchant Taylors' was also a boarding school. It currently caters for over 700 day pupils between the ages of 11 and 18 (with an additional 120 in the Junior School). Lessons run Monday-Friday, 08:40-16:00 (A Saturday working day was abolished in 1981). As a result of these longer school days, holidays are frequently several weeks longer than local education authority dates.

The school is independently run, and, as such, charges tuition fees. Fees were partially subsidised by the Government under the Assisted Places Scheme until the closure of that scheme in 2001. The Schools now run their own means tested Assisted Places Scheme under which about 20% of pupils benefit from free, or reduced-fee places. The schools offer around £1 million a year in bursaries. About 17 per cent of pupils at the two senior schools receive assistance, worth up to 100 per cent of the £11,394 annual fees.

=== Recent history ===
In 2013, Merchant Taylors’ was Crosby’s best performing school with 98% of pupils at the boys’ school achieving five Cs or above in any subject at GCSE.

== Overview ==
=== Academic attainment ===
Academically, the School sees around 60% of grades awarded at A* and A at GCSE and, consistently excellently at A-Level, where 80% and above of grades have been recorded at A*-B. 2012 saw record results at A Level, with the percentage of grades awarded at A* and A 62.3%. The School also enters students for a range of other public examinations, including Extended Project Qualifications, which have been offered since 2011.

=== Extracurricular activities ===
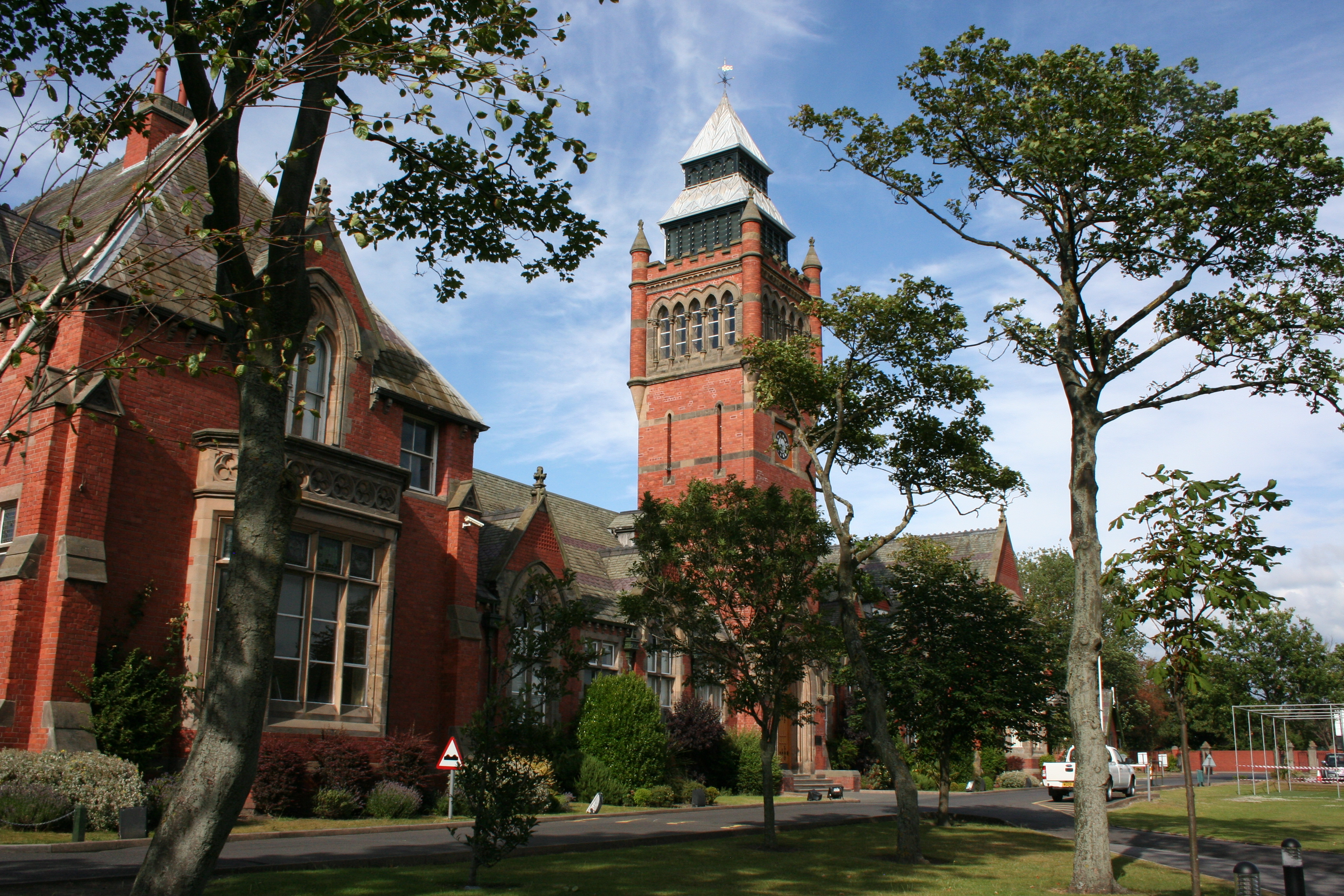
The Clock Tower in Summer

The primary sports played by the school are rugby union, field hockey and cricket, however association football as well as samoan cricket have both recently been introduced as an 'official' school sport and looks set to challenge the more established sports over the coming years. The school also has a boat house which is currently on loan to Southport Dragon Boat Club, in the nearby town of Southport for its rowing team. The rowing team compete in national races with a number of boys competing at national level every year. The rugby coaching staff includes former Scottish international Ian McKie, and included Mike Slemen, former England and British and Irish Lions international and England team selector until his death in 2020.

The school also has a Combined Cadet Force, run in conjunction with Merchant Taylors' Girls' School, headed by Contingent Commander, Major (CCF) Helen Irwin. Her predecessors include Lieutenant Colonel (CCF), Mike Slemen, Squadron Leader Mark Stanley RAFAC (formerly RAFVR(T)) and Lieutenant Colonel (CCF), Paul Irvine. The Army section of MTS CCF is badged as Duke of Lancaster's Regiment (King's Regiment until July 2006). In 2015, Merchant Taylors' CCF celebrated its centenary year. A new banner was presented in the nearby St. Faith's Church, with the then Duke of York in attendance.

In December 2011, the £5.5m Ian Robinson Sports Centre was opened. Facilities include a climbing wall, fitness suite, sports hall and dance studio. The Sports Centre is named after ex Head of Rugby, Ian Robinson, who died on a school sports tour in Australia after a white water rafting accident in 2007. Other facilities include a heated indoor swimming pool on site (which has been emptied and eventually closed permanently in 2020 due to leaking and other maintenance issues so substantial that the cost of rectifying same remains prohibitive), a language laboratory, extensive playing fields, fully equipped science laboratories, an art and design suite, cricket nets, a self-contained music block and a share of Northern Club's facilities.

== Notable people ==
=== Former pupils ===
Old Boys of Merchant Taylors' Boys' School, Crosby, are known at the school as "Old Crosbeians"

- Peter Atkins, Bishop of Waiapu
- Gordon Ellis, painter
- Dick Greenwood, rugby union player who captained England.
- Ben Kay, rugby union player and TV rugby commentator who played for England in the 2003 Rugby World Cup final.
- Charles James Mathews, actor
- Ward Muir (1878–1927), photographer
- Nigel Rees, Author and broadcaster, creator of the long running panel show Quote... Unquote.
- Robert Runcie, Archbishop of Canterbury
- Ronald White, amateur golfer
- Bertie Wilson, Second Engineer on RMS Titanic

=== Headmasters ===
- 2025 Philip Dearden
- 2022-2025 Deiniol Williams
- 2019-2022 David J. Wickes
- 2017-2018 Deiniol Williams (acting)
- 2005-2017 David H. Cook
- 1986-2005 Simon J. R. Dawkins
- 1979-1986 David Ranald Johnston-Jones
- 1964-1979 Hyam Mark Luft
- 1942-1964 Thomas John Pinches York
- 1929-1942 Charles F. Russell
- 1903- 1929 Henry Cradock-Watson
- 1863-1903 Samuel Crawford Armour
- 1861-1863 Robert Oliver Carter
- 1850-1861 John Burnard
- 1829-1849 Joseph Clark
- 1788-1829 Matthew Chester
- 1758-1787 Wilfrid Troutbeck
- 1757-1758 Thomas Mercer [acting]
- 1730-1755 Anthony Halsall
- 1712-1730 Gerard Waring
- 1677-1711 John Waring
- 1661-1677 John Ashworth
- 1652-1660 Edward Mollinex
- 1651-1652 John Stevens
- 1620-1651 John Kidde

=== Notable teachers and staff ===
- Dame Jean Davies, Director of the Women's Royal Naval Service
- John Pugh, Liberal Democrat MP for Southport
- Mike Slemen, former England and British and Irish Lions international and England team selector
- William A. C. Shearer, headmaster of The Latymer School

== See also ==
- Listed buildings in Great Crosby
