= Waterloo Town Hall, Merseyside =

Municipal building in Waterloo, Merseyside, England

Waterloo Town Hall
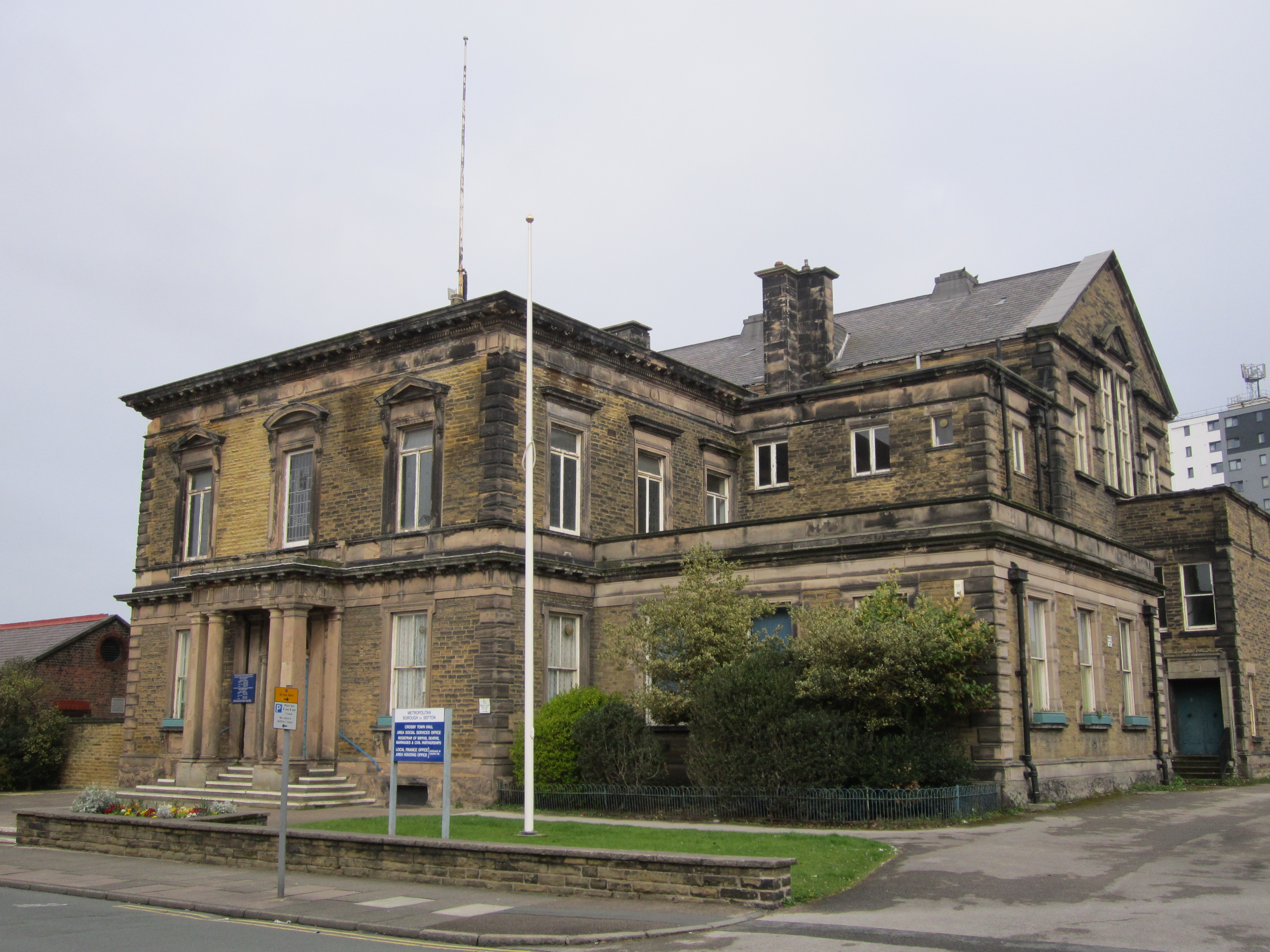
- Waterloo Town Hall

- Shown in Merseyside
- 53.4724°N 3.0251°W
- Location: Waterloo, Merseyside

History
- Built: 1862

Site notes
- Architect: F. S. Spencer Yates
- Architectural style: Italianate style

Listed Building – Grade II
- Official name: Town Hall
- Designated: 26 March 1973
- Reference no.: 1257616

Waterloo Town Hall, also known as Crosby Town Hall (from 1937 to 1974), is a municipal building in Great George's Road in Waterloo, Merseyside, England. The building, which was the headquarters of Waterloo Urban District Council from 1863 to 1937 and then of Crosby Borough Council from 1937 to 1974, is a Grade II listed building.

== History ==
In anticipation of the formation of the new urban district of Waterloo with Seaforth, which was formed out of Litherland in 1863, civic leaders decided to procure a dedicated town hall: the site they selected was open land just south of Waterloo railway station.

The building, which was designed in the Italianate style by the council surveyor, F. S. Spencer Yates, opened in 1862. The design involved a symmetrical main frontage with three bays facing onto Great George's Road; the central section featured a portico with Tuscan order columns supporting a frieze with triglyphs; there was a stained glass pedimented window on the first floor, flanked by two other pedimented windows with plain glass, and there was a cornice with dentils at roof level. Internally, the principal rooms were the council chamber and the mayor's parlour. A large extension to the rear was completed in 1893.

The building served as the town hall for the Waterloo with Seaforth Urban District and, following the merger of that district with Great Crosby Urban District to form the Borough of Crosby, the town hall became headquarters of the new Crosby Borough Council in 1937. (Note: Alexandra Hall, completed in 1888 and situated at the junction of Mersey Road, College Road and Coronation Road had originally contained the council offices for Crosby Urban District Council.) It ceased to be the local seat of government on the formation of Sefton Council in 1974. However, it continued to be used as offices by the social services department of Sefton Council and also continued to be used as the local register office as well as a venue for marriages and civil partnerships. After it became clear that the building was in need of extensive refurbishment, in February 2009, a local residents' association expressed their interest in converting the building for use as a heritage centre.

In March 2020, the town hall, along with the Atkinson Art Gallery and Library and Bootle Town Hall, was the venue for A Nightingale's Song, a video production produced by Illuminos as part of Sefton's Borough of Culture celebrations, which involved the projection of a story describing local coastal communities onto prominent buildings.

== See also ==
- Listed buildings in Great Crosby
