= Waterloo, Merseyside =

Coordinates: 53.4780°N 3.0310°W

Waterloo
- Town
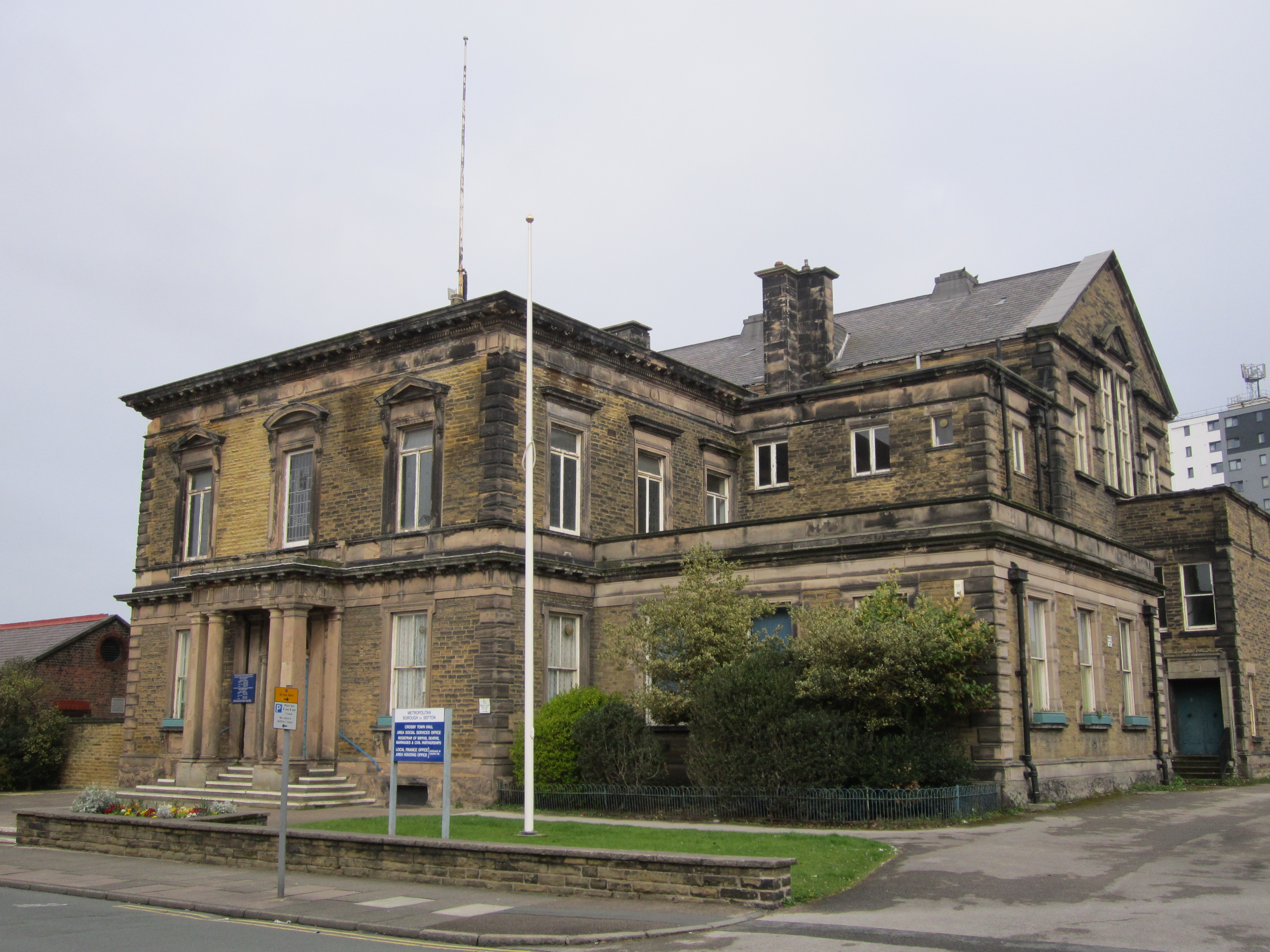
- Waterloo Town Hall

- Location within Merseyside
- OS grid reference: SJ315985
- Metropolitan borough: Sefton
- Metropolitan county: Merseyside
- Region: North West
- Country: England
- Sovereign state: United Kingdom
- Post town: LIVERPOOL
- Postcode district: L22
- Dialling code: 0151
- Police: Merseyside
- Fire: Merseyside
- Ambulance: North West
- UK Parliament: Bootle

Waterloo is a town in the Metropolitan Borough of Sefton, in Merseyside, England. Together with Seaforth, the two settlements make up the borough's Church ward. The area is bordered by Crosby to the north, Seaforth to the south, the Rimrose Valley country park to the east, and Crosby Beach and Crosby Coastal Park to the west.

Crosby Beach begins in Waterloo at the Crosby Marine Park and stretches 3 miles (4.8 km) up to Hightown. The beach is the location of Antony Gormley's Another Place sculpture.

The town is connected to Liverpool in the south and Southport to the north by Merseyrail's Northern line at Waterloo station.

== History ==
Waterloo was historically part of Lancashire and originally an area of Crosby, named Crosby Seabank. At that time it consisted mostly of cottages, the beachfront, sand-hills and fields. The area grew in popularity with wealthy visitors from Liverpool, prompting the planning and construction of a large hotel in the Georgian style to be named the Crosby Seabank Hotel. The grand opening coincided with 18 June 1816, the first anniversary of the Battle of Waterloo, and was named the Royal Waterloo Hotel in honour of the event. Gradually, as the population increased and the area became an identifiable location it became known as Waterloo, with several streets taking the name of names associated with the battle cementing the association.

Some of the buildings in Waterloo such as the Grade II Listed Potters Barn park buildings are replicas of those found in Waterloo, Belgium.

== Governance ==
On 31 December 1894 Waterloo became a civil parish, formed from the part of Great Crosby parish in Waterloo with Seaforth Urban District, and subsequently became part of the municipal borough of Crosby in 1937. In 1951 the parish had a population of 16,997. On 1 April 1974 the parish was abolished and the Municipal Borough of Crosby became part of the newly created Metropolitan Borough of Sefton.

From 1918 until 1950 Waterloo was within the Parliamentary seat known as the Waterloo constituency, a safe seat for the Conservative Party. From 1950 until 2010 Waterloo was within the boundaries of the Crosby constituency. From 1997 to 2010 the Member of Parliament (MP) was Claire Curtis-Thomas, a member of the Labour Party; prior to her election the Crosby seat was generally considered to be a safe Conservative Party stronghold, like its predecessor seat, with Tory MPs elected at every election barring the 1981 Crosby by-election where Shirley Williams of the Social Democratic Party was elected to represent the constituency. As a result of boundary revisions for the 2010 general election, the Crosby constituency was abolished and Waterloo was included in the expanded Bootle constituency. The town has been represented by Labour MP Peter Dowd since 2015.

For elections to Sefton Council, the southern part of Waterloo is within the electoral ward of Church and is represented by three councillors. The northern part from St John's Rd to Queensway is in Victoria ward and is represented by another three councillors.

== Landmarks ==
Waterloo from the Marina

Another Place sculpture by Antony Gormley

Waterloo is made up of predominately Georgian, Edwardian and Victorian villas, mews and terraces, facing the sea. The South Road offers shops and restaurants. A series of public gardens – built as a job creation scheme during the 1930s Great Depression – run adjacent to the esplanade that abuts the marina leading to the coast and beach.

=== Chaffers Running Track ===
Chaffers Running Track was established in the early 1960s. Southport Waterloo Running Club used the cinder track as their base for about 15 years until the Litherland Park Sports Centre was built in 2007. Chaffers fell into disuse until plans were announced in 2020 to restore it. It is now the home of the Marsh Lane Harriers running club.

=== Rimrose Valley Wildflower Meadow ===
In 2019, a 3 acre wildflower meadow was established instigated by local resident Linda Gaskell with help from Sefton Councillor Michael Roche. The meadow is located within the former athletic track At Chafer's Fields. The varieties were selected by Richard Scott of the Eden Project and include Cornflower, sunflower, field marigold, camomile and poppies. It is planned to extend the meadow each year along the Valley.

=== The Marina ===
The Marina is a stretch of fields and protected natural wildlife area near the Marina Lake. The area begins adjacent to the Royal Seaforth Dock. A path runs through the Marina toward the sand dunes of Crosby Beach, it is the main route taken by foot to get to the beach, beginning at the top of South Road, Waterloo. The Marina has a café (Waterloo Place opened in 2015) and the Crosby Lakeside Adventure Centre (opened in early 2010).

=== Antony Gormley's "Another Place" ===
The beach at Waterloo is the permanent home of Antony Gormley's Another Place. The permanent art installation consists of figures of cast iron facing out to sea, spread over a 2 mile (3.2 km) stretch of the beach between Waterloo and Blundellsands.

=== The Plaza Community Cinema ===
The Plaza Cinema has been a part of the fabric of Waterloo since 1939. The opening coincided with the outbreak of World War II forcing it to immediately close its doors under wartime restrictions until the public order was rescinded by the government. Originally named The Plaza, it has changed hands numerous times during its life, becoming known as The Odeon in the 1950s, The Classic in the 1970s and The Apollo in the 1990s.

In 1996 the cinema was closed when the owners decided to sell the property for redevelopment. After numerous petitions the cinema was reopened on 18 July 1997 under a community trust and its original name restored. After successfully raising money to secure equipment, the re-opened cinema was staffed entirely by volunteers apart from the projectionist. After the support of British Film Commissioner Sir Sydney Samuelson the cinema was able to secureThe Lost World: Jurassic Park as first film to be shown. Since then The Plaza has been a focal community point in Waterloo, offering Autism friendly screenings, Kids clubs and social clubs. In September 2009 the Plaza celebrated its 70th anniversary.

In May 2010, the venue hosted the celebration event for the Who I Am and Where I'm From project which showcased a collection of animations produced by the Polish Community in Sefton called Polska Tales.

In July 2011 the cinema completed an £80,000 refurbishment that saw Sir Sydney Samuelson attend its reopening ceremony.

In 2016 the Plaza was awarded a Queen's Award for Voluntary Service.

== Education ==
There are three primary schools: Waterloo Primary, St. Johns C of E Primary, and St Edmunds & St Thomas's RC. Local high schools are in Crosby.

== Transport ==
The district is served by Waterloo station on the Northern Line of the Merseyrail network. Waterloo is connected to Liverpool by the Dock Road. The number 53 bus runs through South Road, Waterloo and into Liverpool City centre.

== Sport ==
Waterloo was home to Waterloo rugby club who took their name from the area, having played there from 1884 until 1892 before moving back to Blundellsands. In 1992, they famously defeated then English champions and cup holders Bath 9-8 in a fourth round cup tie. The marina in Waterloo, and adjacent Crosby Lakeside Adventure Centre, is home to the Crosby Scout and Guide Marina Club.

== Notable residents ==
- Cherie Booth
- J. Bruce Ismay
- Charles Alfred Bartlett, captain of HMHS Britannic when she sank
- Edward Smith (sea captain), captain of RMS Titanic when she sank
- Josh Kirby
- Frank McLardy, member of the British Union of Fascists and Waffen-SS British Free Corps
- Nicholas Murray, locally born author
- Ward Muir, photographer and author
- Jean Davies, British Royal Navy Officer

== Links with Sierra Leone ==
A local charity, the Waterloo Partnership, fundraises for Waterloo, a city in the Western Area of Sierra Leone and the capital of that country's Western Area Rural District.

== See also ==
- Listed buildings in Great Crosby
