= Blundellsands =

Area of Crosby, Merseyside, England

Coordinates: 53.4800°N 3.0500°W

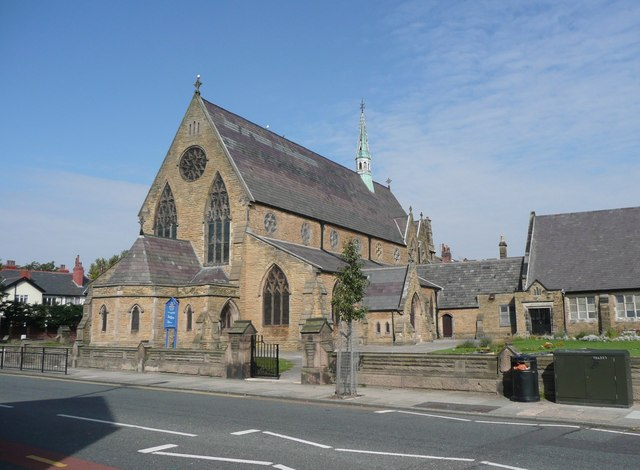
- St. Nicholas' Church, Blundellsands

- Location within Merseyside
- Population: 11,514 (2001 census)
- OS grid reference: SJ304990
- Metropolitan borough: Sefton
- Metropolitan county: Merseyside
- Region: North West
- Country: England
- Sovereign state: United Kingdom
- Post town: LIVERPOOL
- Postcode district: L23
- Dialling code: 0151
- Police: Merseyside
- Fire: Merseyside
- Ambulance: North West
- UK Parliament: Sefton Central

Blundellsands is an area of Crosby in the ceremonial county of Merseyside, England and in the historic county of Lancashire. The area was created as a suburb for wealthy businessmen from Liverpool by the Blundell family of Crosby Hall in the middle of the 19th century.

It is part of the Metropolitan Borough of Sefton, and a Sefton council electoral ward. At the 2001 census the population was recorded as 11,514. This area was not measured in the 2011 Census. For current figures see Blundellsands (Ward).

== Description ==
Blundellsands is an area north to the city of Liverpool and to the west of Crosby with Hightown and Little Crosby to the north, Great Crosby and Thornton to the east and Brighton-le-Sands and Waterloo to the south.

The area is served by Blundellsands & Crosby and Hall Road railway stations. Its shoreline, the northern part of Crosby Beach, includes parts of the popular exhibit, Another Place, designed by the sculptor Antony Gormley. Several of the Gormley statues are accessible from the Burbo Bank car park.

By comparison to the residential areas of the wider Liverpool City Region, Blundellsands has a low population density combined with significantly higher than average property prices, it is therefore considered to be an affluent area of the region.

== Education ==
There are several independent and public schools in the area.

== History ==
Blundellsands was named in honour of the famous Blundell family of Little Crosby, Catholic recusants during the English Reformation, who owned the land upon which the area was built, beginning in the 1870s. The family dedicated land for recreation as well as for housing, including Key Park (1905).

Thomas Mellard Reade (1832–1909) architect laying out the Blundellsands estate in 1868. He was also a civil engineer, and geologist and worked at Liverpool University.

== Sport ==
Blundellsands is the home of Waterloo Rugby Club, founded in 1882, and the West Lancashire Golf Club.

== Notable people ==
Gerald Gardner, the founder of Gardnerian Wicca, a denomination of the Neopagan religion of Wicca, was born in Blundellsands in 1884, although he lived there for only a few years.

TV presenter Anne Robinson's family home was at St Michael's Road.

== See also ==
- Listed buildings in Blundellsands
