= Waterloo with Seaforth Urban District =

Former local government area in the UK

Coordinates: 53°28′N 3°01′W

Waterloo with Seaforth was an Urban District in the administrative county of Lancashire until 1937 when it was annexed to the municipal borough of Crosby, Merseyside. It included the settlements of Seaforth and Waterloo.

On account of its facilities for bathing, firm sands, pleasant scenery and nearness to Liverpool, it was much frequented both by visitors and by residents.
