= Martyn Andrews =

British television presenter, broadcast journalist, trained actor, and singer

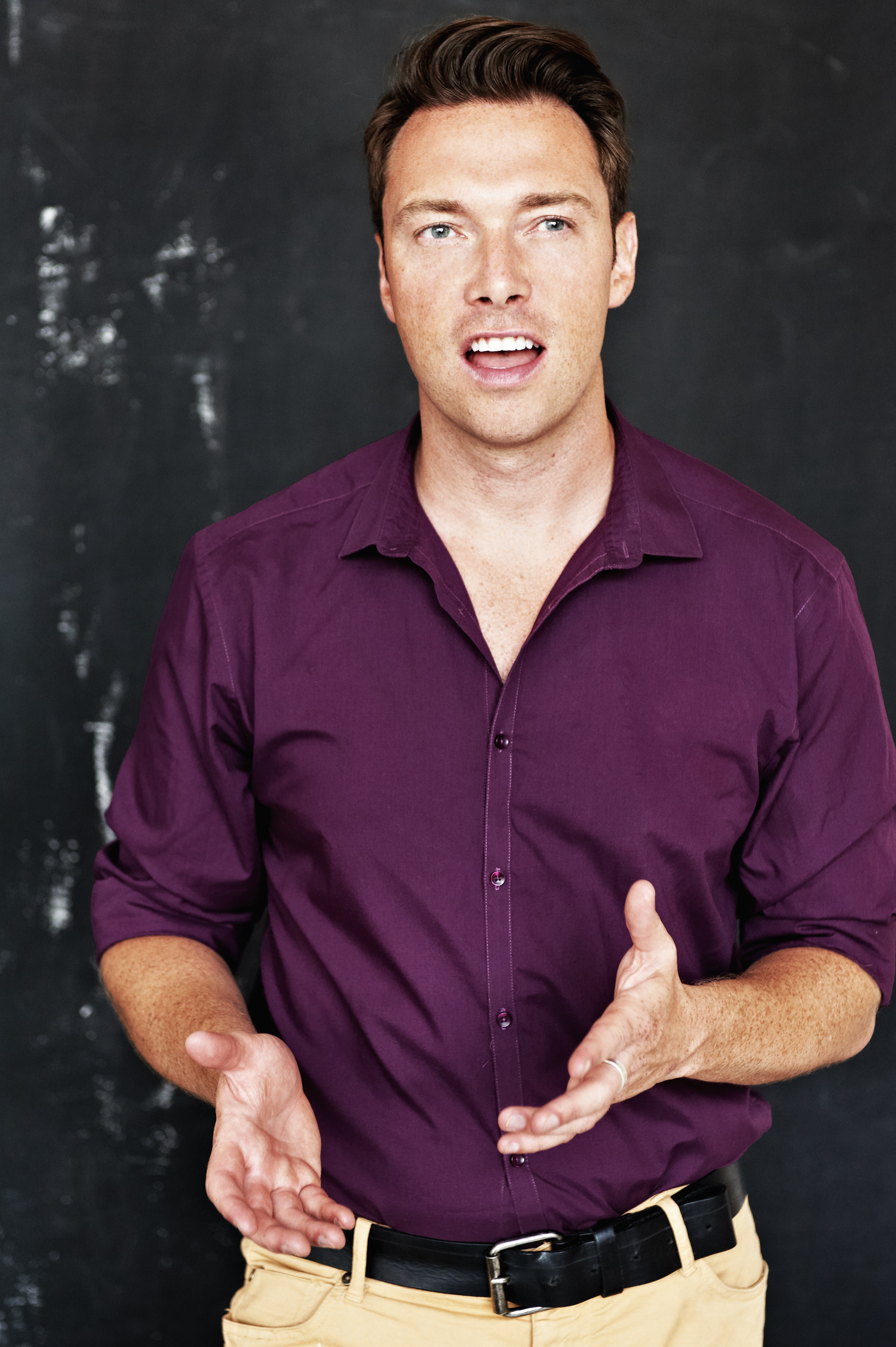
- Martyn Andrews
- Born: Martyn Andrews; 9 April 1979 (age 47); Crosby, Liverpool, England
- Occupation: television presenter
- Employer: TRT World
- Known for: NYMT; Whistle Down the Wind; Starlight Express
- Website: martynandrews.tv

Martyn Andrews is a British TV executive producer, television presenter, broadcast journalist, actor and singer. He currently works at TRT World News in Istanbul. He develops and produces TV formats and documentaries, makes other freelance television appearances for various media outlets and also writes for several travel websites, lifestyle publications and inflight magazines. His various TV contracts and personal travels have taken him to over 170 countries around the world.

Andrews has created, authored, co-produced and hosted a range of television shows on several major networks. He was the cultural face of RT (Russia Today TV) presenting from their London studios for seven years with nine previously in Moscow, Russia. He has also appeared on CNN's Connect The World, on ITV's daily chat show The Alan Titchmarsh Show and worked on programmes in series 1 and 3 in "How The Other Half Lives" for Channel 5/Spun Gold TV in London/Moscow alongside Eamonn Holmes and Ruth Langsford. He reported live for 2 months from the 2014 Winter Olympics and Paralympics in Sochi for RT International news and CTVam broadcast in Canada and The Eurovision Song Contest in Moscow.

== Early life ==
Born Andrew Martin in Liverpool, England, at 18 years old he became a member of the "National Youth Music Theatre" of Great Britain. In 2000 he gained a BA (hons) Degree in Performance from Mountview Theatre School and in 2005 studied the NCTJ Journalism course at the No Sweat College London.

Andrews first ever major television presenting opportunity was for a BBC youth special "Songs of Praise". The BBC later asked him back as a guest soloist on the live TV event "Merseyglory", at Everton's Goodison Park Stadium.

As a professional performer Andrews took lead roles in several UK and European major musicals ranging from Andrew Lloyd Webber's Starlight Express to Whistle Down the Wind before re-training and moving full-time into broadcast journalism.

== Career ==
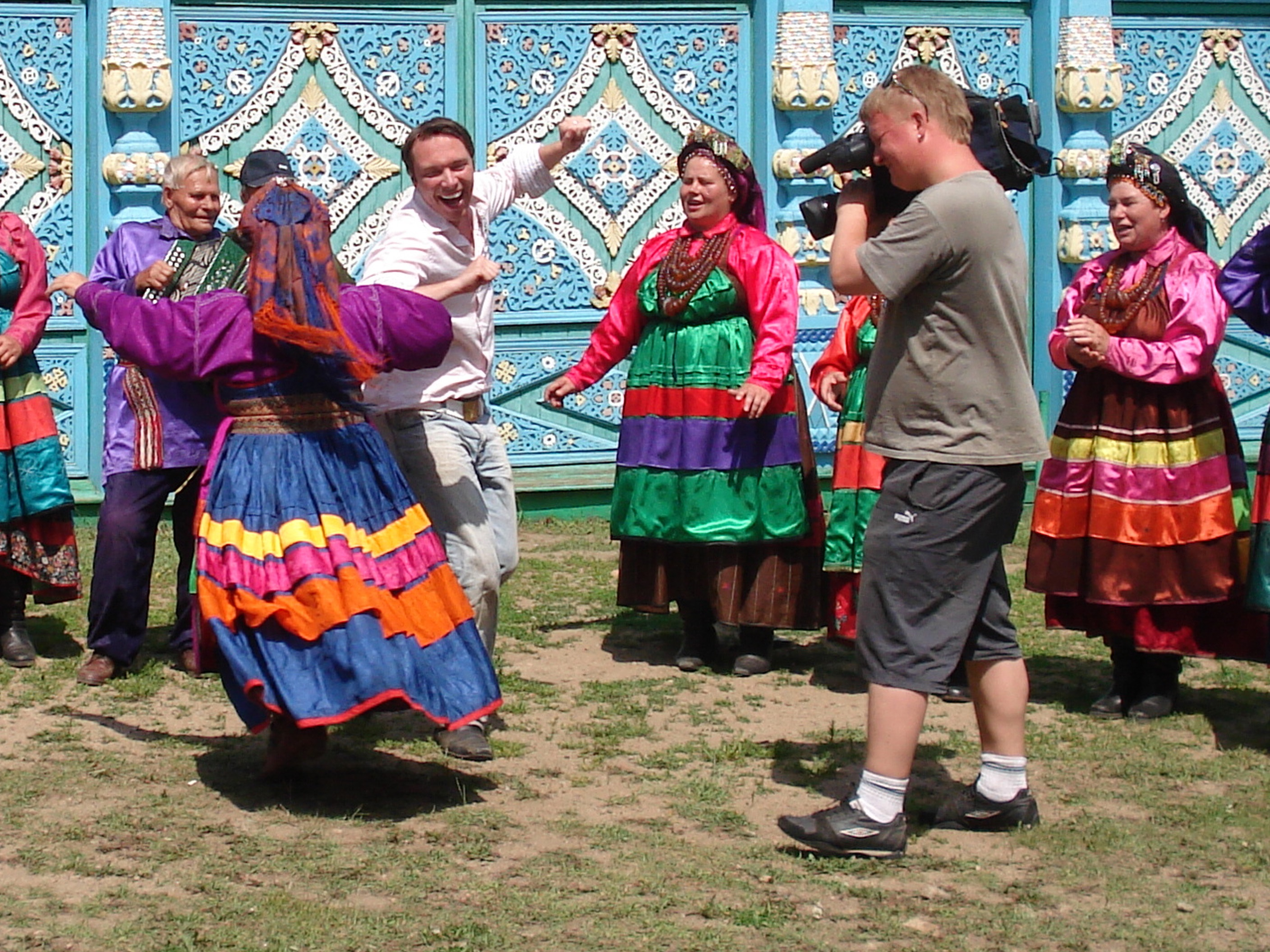
Martyn filming for Russia Today Wayfarer Travel Show, in 2009.

In 2003 Andrews was invited by the network RTVI in Tel Aviv to work on the English speaking documentary series Undiscovered Egypt. From sleeping alone in the Giza pyramids to discovering Egyptian secrets, Andrews' story was also featured in the book "The Pyramid Quest" written by Dr. Robert M. Schoch. Martyn then moved to New York City in 2004 to head up the award-winning TV documentary series "My Abyss", a dangerous diving show for Overseas Media Ltd in Manhattan - training and filming in dozens of exotic locations around the globe including Hawaii, Thailand, Bermuda and Australia.

Returning to the UK in 2005, he began writing travel articles and went on to produce and co-host the live UK based chat show Lounge Living TV alongside Charlotte Jackson, the "Live Big Brother Event" for Endemol/T4 and became the face of Italy's main language DVD series before being offered the opportunity to move to Russia. In 2005 Andrews moved to Moscow for the launch of the new international news channel Russia Today TV (later renamed RT). Co-presenting in the channel's first ever hour on air (10 December 2005), Andrews co-ordinated and exec produced the award-winning live studio programme "Entertainment Today" which he also co-hosted for three years, as well as presenting one of the networks first programmes in 2006, the food and travel show "Culinary Quest".

Andrews became known by audiences around the world in 2007 after he became the host of RT's most popular extreme travel series, Wayfarer, an adventure TV show that saw him report from minus 40 to plus 40, through 11 time zones in over 75 cities in Russia and the former Soviet Republics. Over three series he lived with Eskimos in the Polar Circle, trained with Russian Cosmonauts and the Russian army, scuba dived in dangerous karst lakes, explored secret tunnels and bunkers of the Kremlin, base jumped from the Caucasus Mountains, was set on fire at Mosfilm studios, played with tigers in Siberia, played on Tchaikovsky's piano, paraglided over warzones and danced with locals in Outer Mongolia.

His other TV shows broadcast on RT included the award-winning weekly culture show Moscow Out which Andrews exec produced, authored and presented from 2009 - 2011, Venice of the North: A Season in St Petersburg - a travel series on Russia's stunning former capital, Russian Around a historical travel series in 2011 on Russian culture filming in London, Paris, Florence and Rome, A Prime Recipe a food strand, The Golden Ring - A Tour in Time. He reported live from the Eurovision Song contest in Moscow 2009. In 2010 Martyn was also Channel M's live studio travel expert in Manchester, England.

In 2012 he became the Arts and Culture Reporter for RT's evening magazine show Prime Time. In 2013 he became one of the faces of RT's new breakfast show Privet Russia and also started social and human interest reports for RT International. Martyn reported live on the Soyuz rocket launch in Kazakhstan and Martyn's stories on Russia's developing LGBT community and the Winter Olympics in Sochi raised his profile internationally.

In the summer of 2014 Martyn moved back to London full-time for the launch of RT UK (a daily opt out for RT's British viewers) where he was Senior producer and Social Affairs and News Correspondent for RT UK news filming different consumer, social and human interest stories from all over the UK. In 2020 he presented and produced “The Lowdown” show discussing the coronavirus pandemic and from January 2021 he became one of the networks main live news broadcasters covering COVID-19 and political updates.

A selection of Martyn's TV shows have been broadcast on RTD (RT's documentary channel), CYRT Cyprus, Euronews, Airirang TV in South Korea, Aeroflot's long haul in flight service and the Sapsan train networks.

== Journalism ==
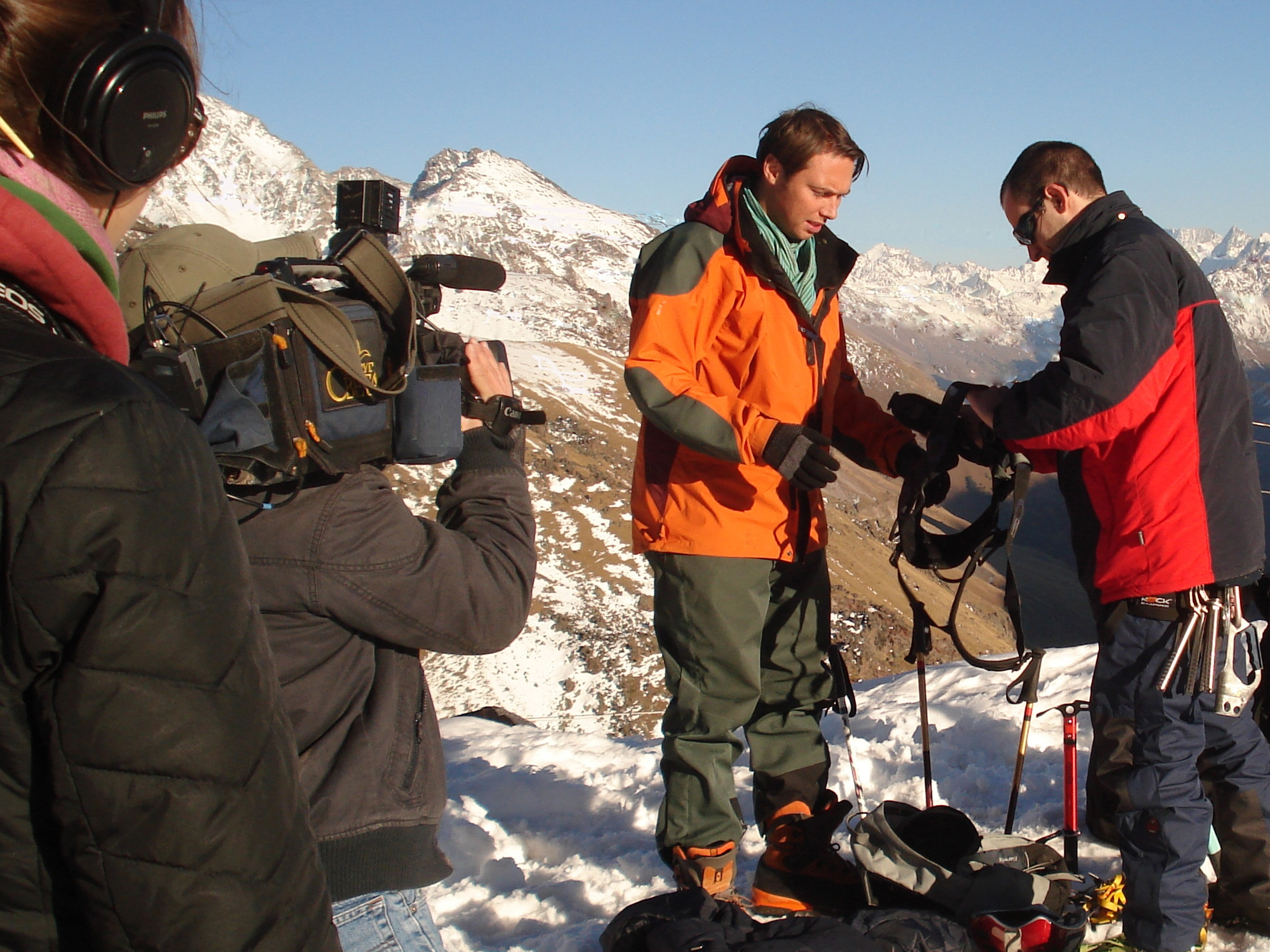
Martyn climbs Mount Elbruss Russia in 2011.

Andrews is used by press and media all over the world. He has appeared as a panel member on various TV shows, compared business conferences, appeared as a guest speaker at numerous travel events, presented hotel corporate videos, voiced documentaries, idents and adverts and has been master of ceremonies at dozens of live corporate and private events.

As a print journalist he has had dozens of articles published featuring freelance travel advice, restaurant reviews, interviews and personal features in the UK, American and worldwide press including his popular blog in Conde Nast Traveller magazine.

OK! Magazine has stated that Martyn was "One To Watch" and Beige Magazine in London published an article with headline "The Rising Tsar". In January 2015 he was awarded a gratuitous diploma by Vladimir Putin for his television work at the Sochi Olympics.
