= Cristea Roberts Gallery =

Art gallery in London, England

Coordinates: 51.5060°N 0.1361°W

Cristea Roberts Gallery, formerly Alan Cristea Gallery, is a commercial gallery in central London that was founded by Alan Cristea in 1995. David Cleaton-Roberts, Helen Waters and Kathleen Dempsey are also senior directors. Cristea Roberts Gallery has a particular focus on original prints and works on paper. It is located at 43 Pall Mall, London.

== Representation ==
Cristea Roberts Gallery has a particular focus on original prints and works on paper. Since its inception, the gallery has commissioned a significant number of editions by a wide range of international artists including Georg Baselitz, Ali Banisadr, Christiane Baumgartner, Rana Begum, Jim Dine, Yinka Shonibare CBE, Julian Opie, Ian Davenport, Michael Craig-Martin, Cornelia Parker, Idris Khan, Clare Woods and Antony Gormley; the gallery also represents a number of artists for their unique works including Vicken Parsons, Emma Stibbon, and Marie Harnett.

The gallery's programme is dedicated to publishing, cataloguing, exhibiting and dealing in original prints, paintings and works on paper by its roster of over 30 international artists and Estates, and is the worldwide representative for the prints from The Josef Albers and Anni Albers Foundation, the Tom Wesselmann Estate, the Naum Gabo Estate, The Richard Hamilton Estate, the Howard Hodgkin Estate and the Patrick Heron Estate. In 2020 the gallery held its first solo exhibition of the prints of Bridget Riley in collaboration with the artist and announced representation of the prints of Dame Paula Rego.

The gallery participates in major international art fairs and has a programme of exhibitions hosted in its bespoke space in Pall Mall, London. The gallery works closely with international museums on acquisitions and loans, and examples of its editions are held in major public collections around the world including Tate, London; Metropolitan Museum of Art, New York; and Museum of Modern Art, New York.

== History ==
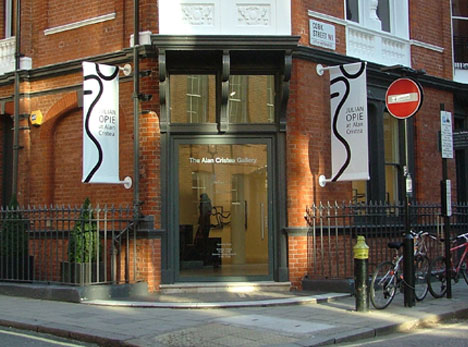
Previous location at Cork Street

The gallery moved to Pall Mall from Cork Street in 2016.

In September 2019, the gallery changed its name from the Alan Cristea Gallery to the Cristea Roberts Gallery.

The first exhibition in the new gallery space on Pall Mall was entitled Howard Hodgkin: After All. Previous exhibitions at the gallery include Edmund de Waal, Richard Serra, Antony Gormley, Gillian Ayres, Patrick Caulfield, Jim Dine, Tom Wesselmann, Michael Craig-Martin, and Julian Opie.
