= Stay (sculptures) =

Sculptures by Antony Gormley in Christchurch, New Zealand

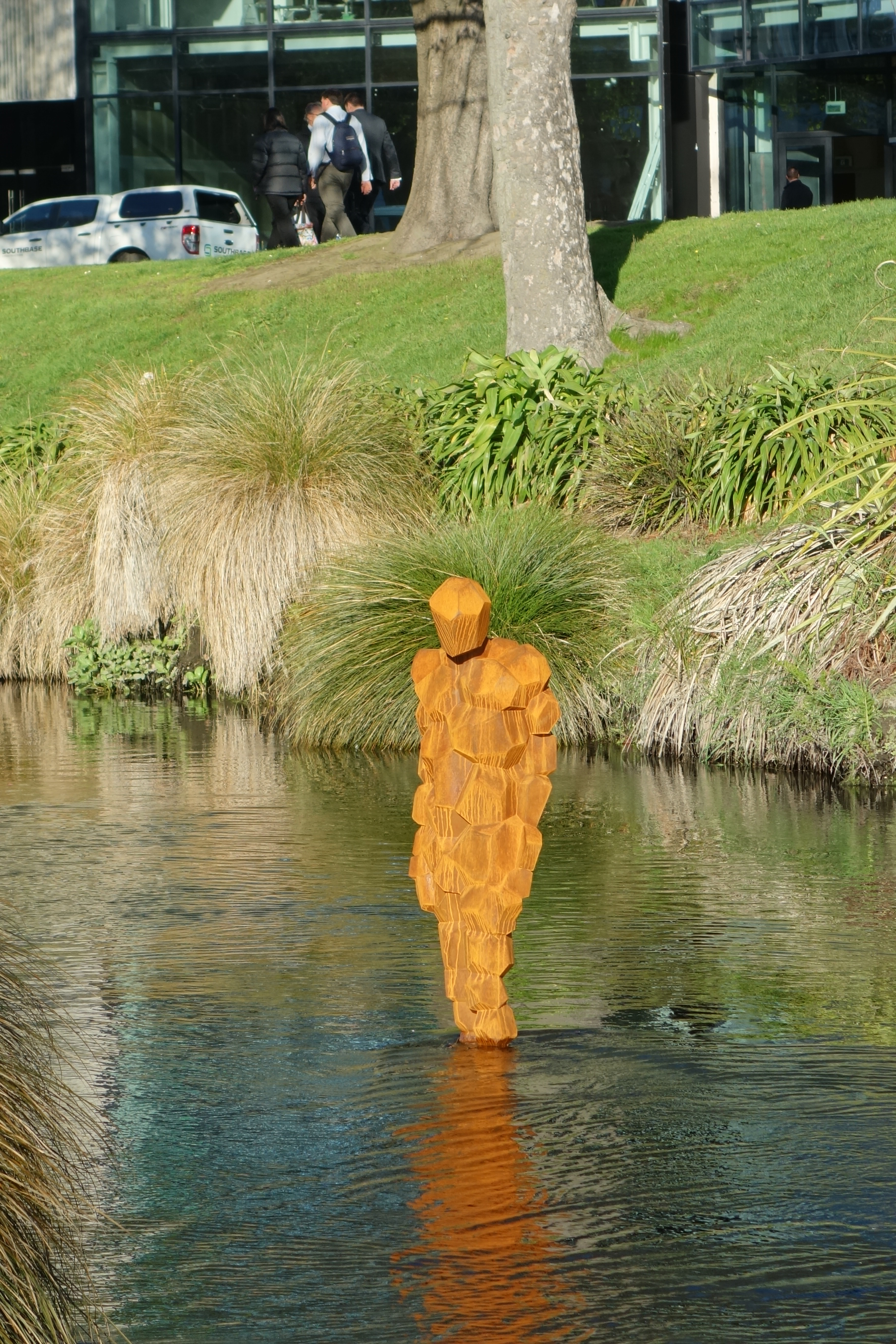
- Avon River installation of Stay
- Artist: Antony Gormley
- Year: 2015
- Type: cast iron
- Weight: 650 kg
- Location: Christchurch, New Zealand
- Owner: Christchurch City Council

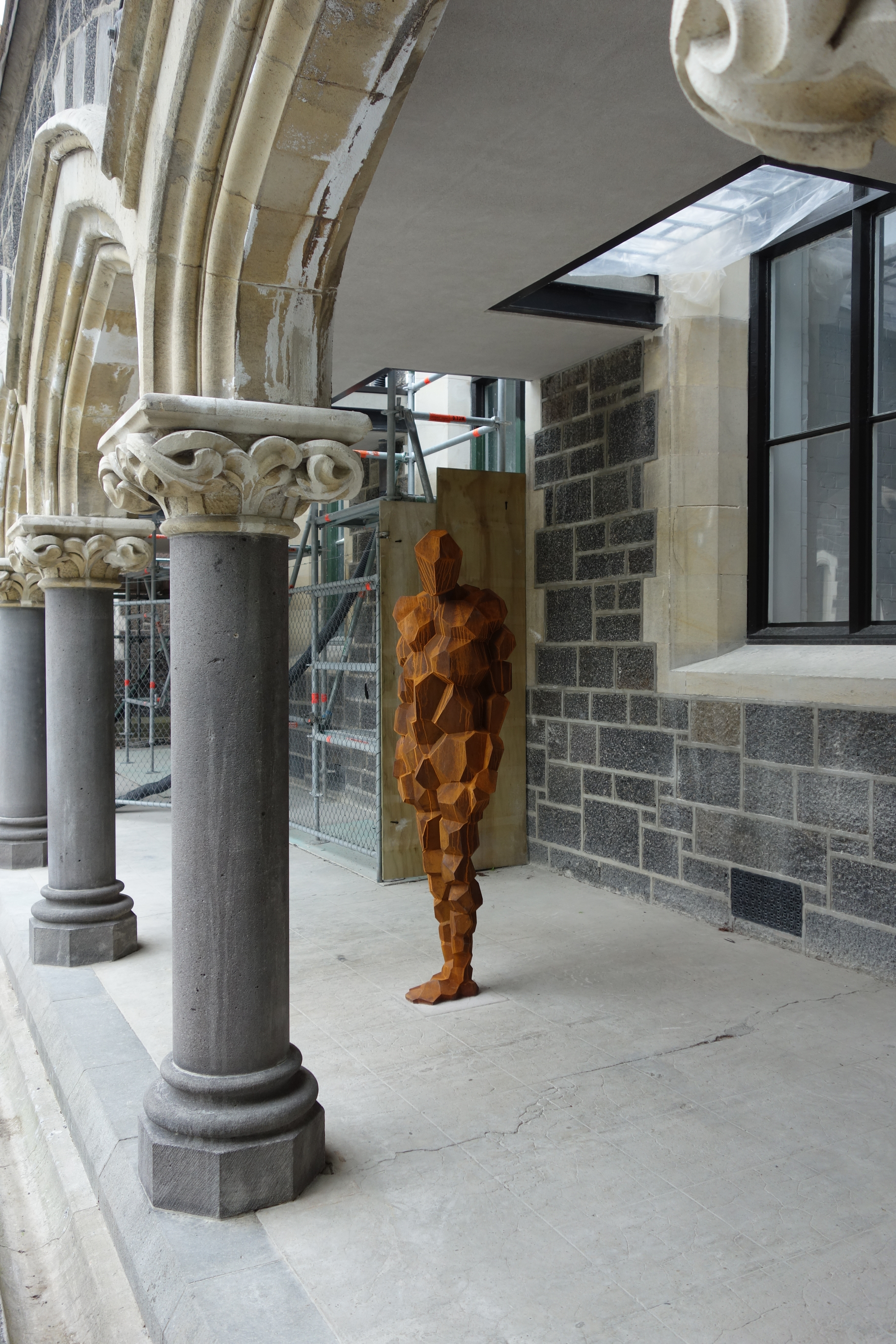
Arts Centre installation

Stay are identical cast iron human form sculptures made by Antony Gormley and installed in two locations in the central city of Christchurch, New Zealand. The first sculpture was installed in the Avon River in September 2015. The second in the Northern Quadrangle of the Christchurch Arts Centre was unveiled on 1 October 2016.

== Background ==
Gormley visited Christchurch in 2007 and remembers it as a city "blessed with open spaces and relatively wide streets and no great high-rises". The central city received massive damage in the February 2011 Christchurch earthquake. Gormley was approached in 2014 about contributing an artwork to Christchurch, and he provided two identical cast iron sculptures that can contribute to the 'healing' of the city, as he called it.

Christchurch is a well-ordered city based on a 19th century urban plan which suddenly became chaotic through planetary forces rupturing human design. SCAPE 8 presents the ideal opportunity to ask whether art can instigate and give space for new attitudes and begin to heal and encourage reconciliation. Post-quake, this city is a human habitat forced by nature to reformulate. The attitude of the work I have made for it carries a sense of reflection or 'taking stock'.

— Antony Gormley

Gormley stated that he made his work available at a discounted rate, and had therefore asked for the price not to be revealed. The purchase and installation was funded by Christchurch City Council (CCC) and the Canterbury Earthquake Recovery Authority (CERA). CCC contributed NZ$502,500 towards the cost, whilst CERA would not disclose the size of their contribution.

The first announcement about the legacy (i.e. permanent) artworks by Gormley was made in April 2015, when it was revealed that his work was to be installed in Christchurch as part of the Scape8 public art exhibition, to be held from 3 October to 15 November 2015.

== Avon River installation ==
Avon River coordinates: 43°31′48.43″S 172°38′0.88″E

The local newspaper, The Press, reported on 22 September 2015 of the pending installation of the first sculpture in the Avon River, just upstream from the Gloucester Street Bridge. A 6 metres (20 ft) pile was screwed into the riverbed, and the sculpture installed onto this foundation on 29 September. This was the first work of Gormley installed in New Zealand.

== Arts Centre installation ==
Arts Centre coordinates: 43°31′52.58″S 172°37′41.82″E

The second sculpture was unveiled in the Northern Quadrangle of the Christchurch Arts Centre on 1 October 2016.
