= Havmannen =

Sculpture by Antony Gormley in Norway

Coordinates: 66°18′37″N 14°07′39″E

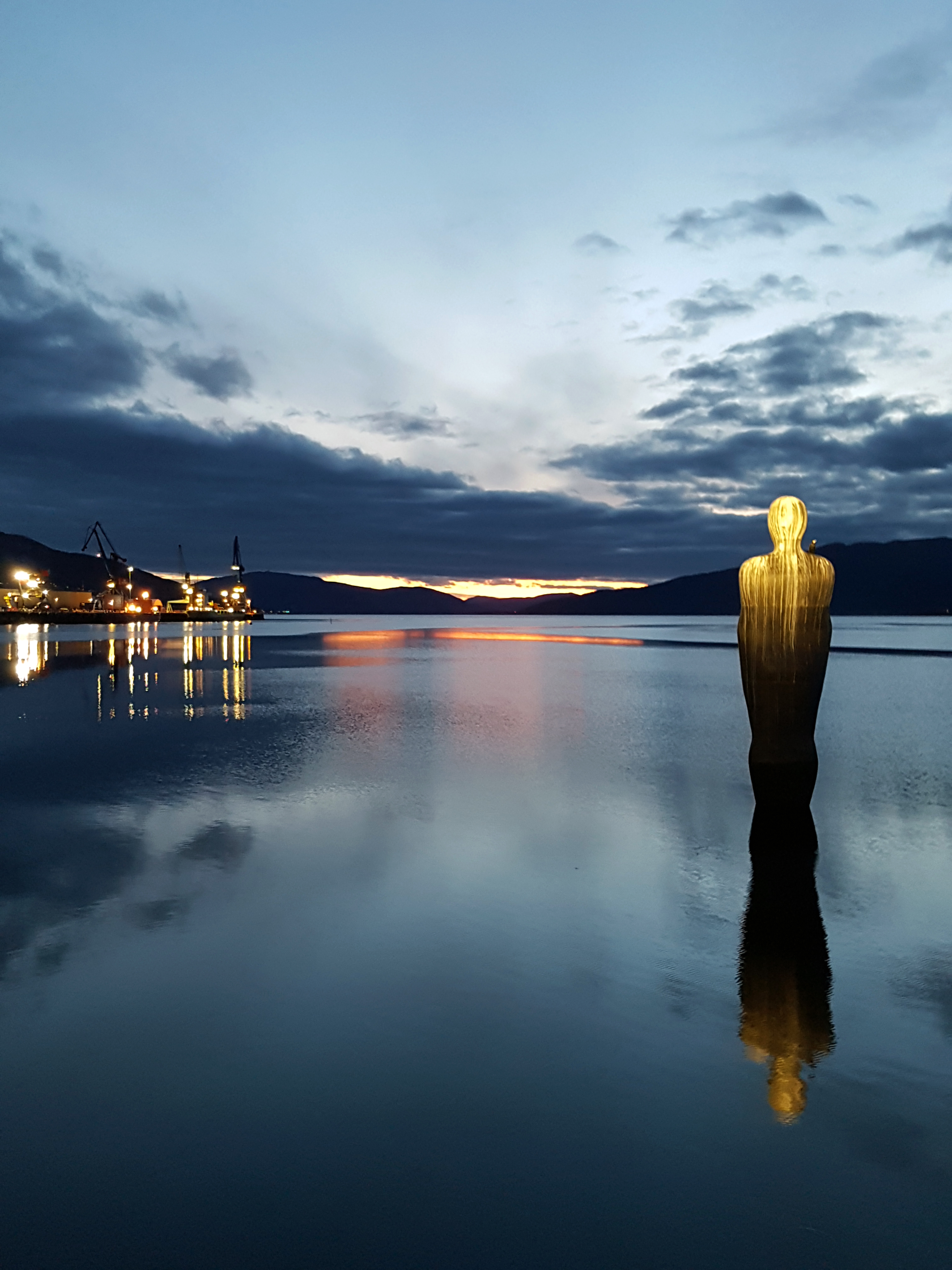
As seen when looking out over the fjord.

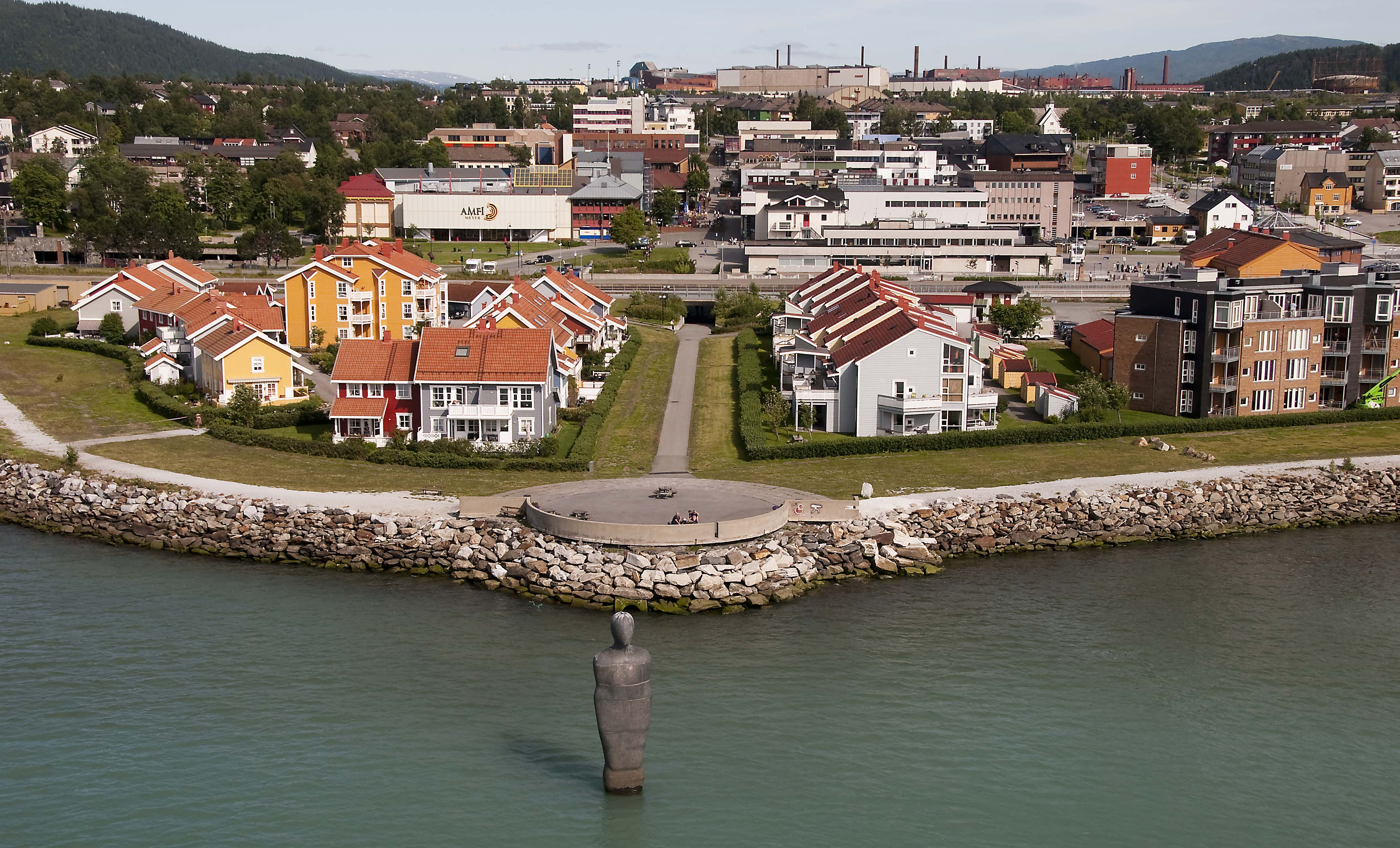
Location in front of the town.

Havmannen, or Havmann (in English: "The Man from the Sea"), is a granite stone sculpture by the English artist Antony Gormley located in the city of Mo i Rana in northern Norway. The sculpture stands in the "Ranfjord" in the city, which is often referred to in Norway as "Polarsirkelbyen" (in English: the "Arctic Circle City"). The sculpture is 11 metres (36 ft) tall, weighs 60 tonnes (59 long tons; 66 short tons), and according to Lonely Planet is "forever up to his knees in water, turns his back on the town and gazes resolutely out over the fjord".

The artist originally envisaged the sculpture being created in steel, based on the traditional steel industry which was one of the pillars of industrial Mo i Rana, and placed in the fjord to illustrate the sharp contrasts between nature and industry. However, the local industry was undergoing major changes at the time, with what was effectively state subsidized and unprofitable factories being closed down, including the local steel works. Realizing the project using local steel therefore became impossible. As a result, Havmann was to become Gormley's first large stone sculpture.

The sculpture was created and erected in the Ranfjord in 1995 as part of Artscape Nordland, causing controversy and much debate in the local media, notably in the local paper Rana Blad, which received hundreds of letters and over 300 poems dedicated to the sculpture. The local debate was ongoing for months, and mainly focused on two issues: whether the commissioning of the sculpture was good use of public money, and maybe less serious, a concern about the newly erected sculpture's lack of an erectable device. Despite the initial debate and controversy, citizens of Mo i Rana today take pride in the sculpture by the internationally renowned artist Gormley and have adopted it as an ambassador for the town. The sculpture has inspired and given name to an annual festival, Havmanndagene (the "Havmann days") which is held in the city every year in May.
