= Crosby Beach =

Beach near Liverpool, England

- Beach
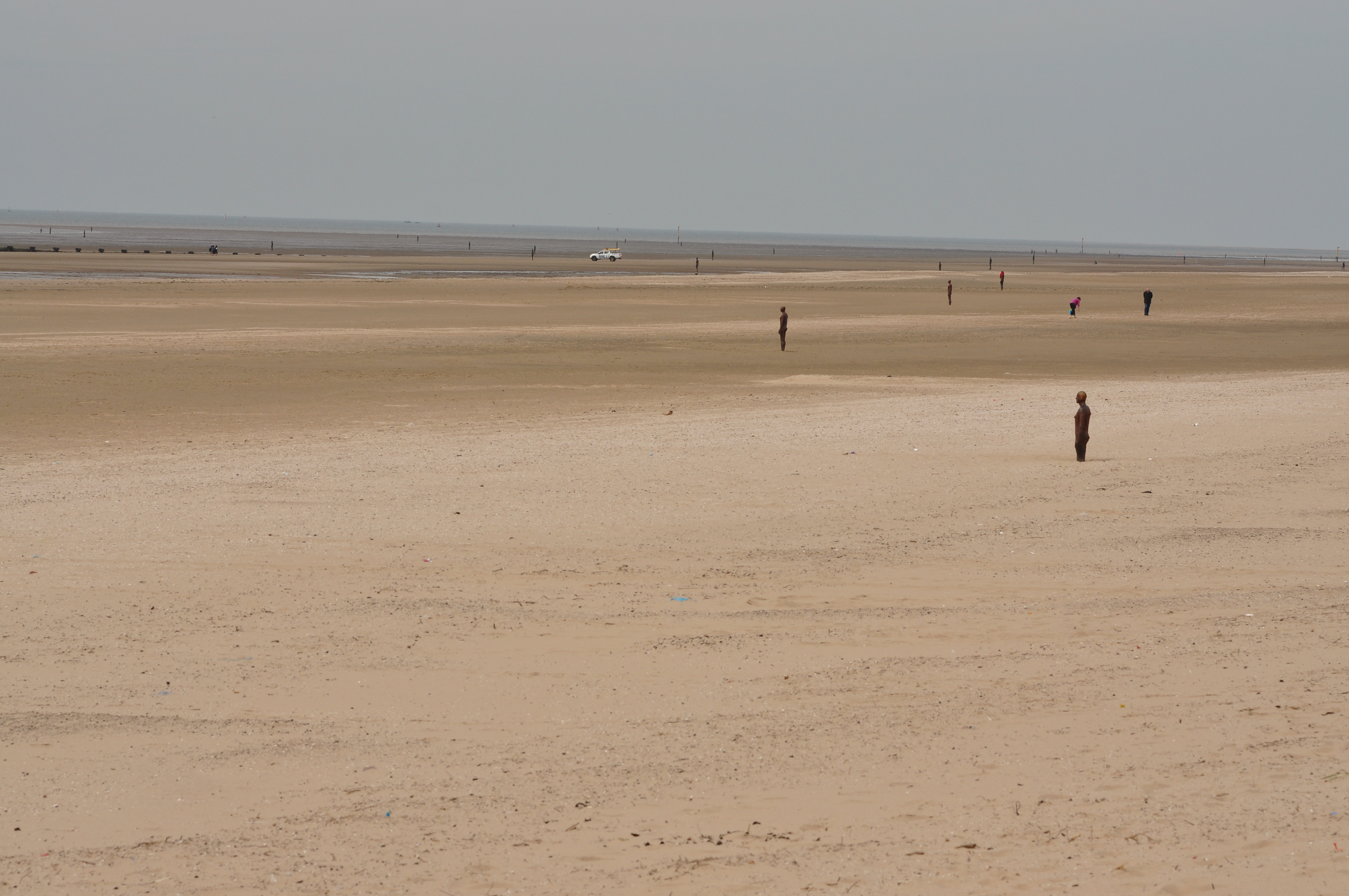
- View out to sea, with the Iron Men in view

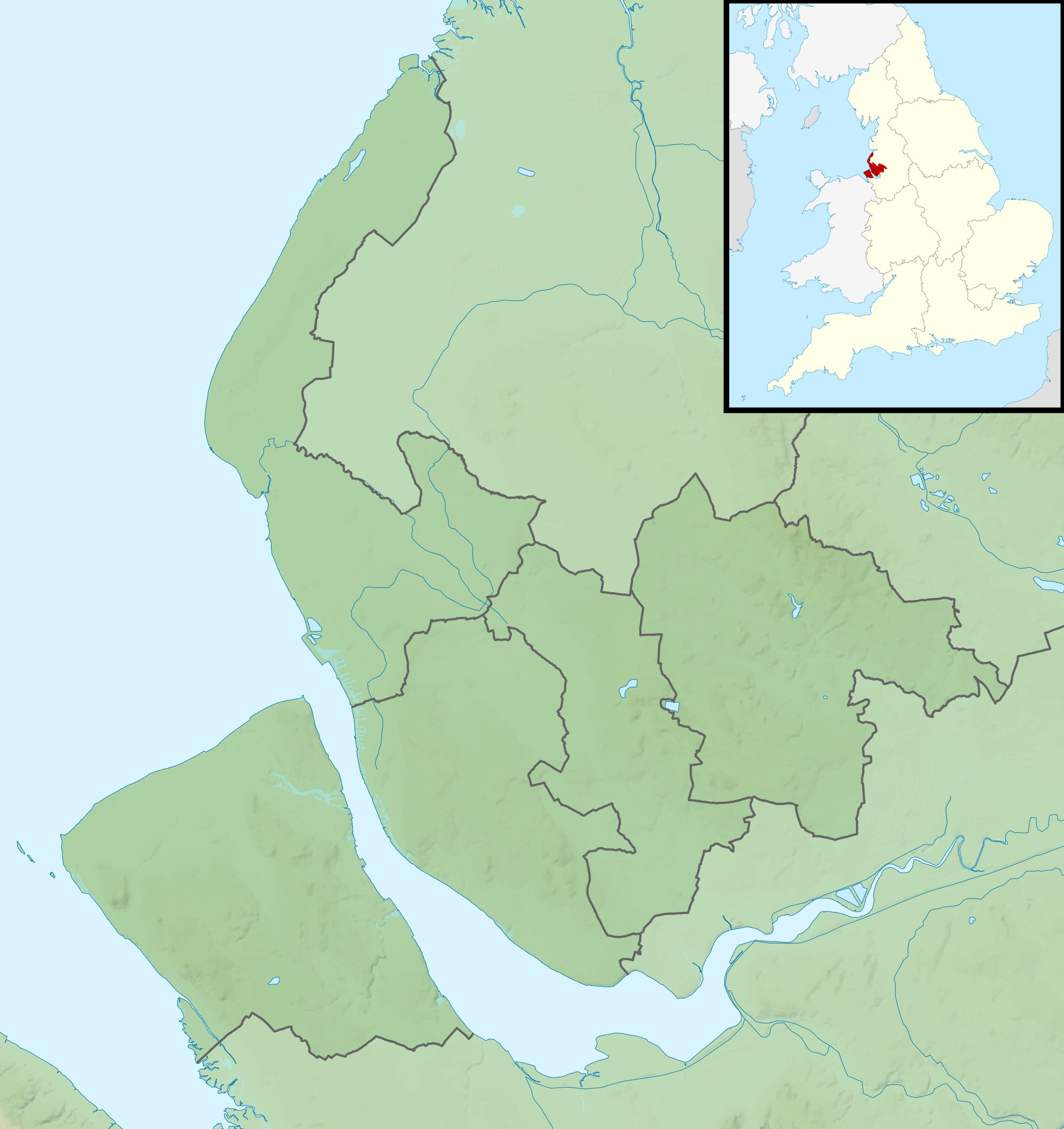
- Location within Merseyside
- Coordinates: 53.477°N 3.042°W
- Location: Crosby, Merseyside

Dimensions
  - Length: 2.5 miles (4.0 km)
- Patrolled by: His Majesty's Coastguard
- Access: Waterloo (Merseyside), Blundellsands and Crosby, and Hall Road railway stations

Crosby Beach is part of the Merseyside coastline north of Liverpool in the Metropolitan Borough of Sefton, England, stretching about 2.5 miles (4.0 km) North-West from the Seaforth Dock in the Port of Liverpool, through Waterloo, where it separates the sea from the Marina. The beach was awarded Keep Britain Tidy's Quality Coast Award in 2011.

Since 2007, the beach has been the permanent home of the Another Place sculptures by Antony Gormley.

== History ==
The beach was stabilised from the mid 19th century, as prior to this, high sea tides could come in as far as the first row of houses. In the older dunes north of the coastguard station, between the sea and the West Lancashire Golf Club, there are still some remains of the old wartime defenses. The navigable shipping channel in Liverpool Bay, connecting the River Mersey to the Irish Sea, runs parallel to the beach to around the coastguard station where it swings out to sea.

=== 20th century litter problems ===
During the 1960s, the beach suffered with severe litter problems, described in 1962 as the "worst ever". Just the year before, there was a reported 3,000 'glass victims' requiring first aid treatment. Girl Guides helped clean the beach of litter in 1962 and 1963. To combat the litter issues, a £5,000 machine named the "beach sanitizer" was imported from America in the late 1960s, which worked by turning over the first four inches (100 mm) of sand and sifting out any litter. Issues with litter were also reported during the 1980s and 1990s, including reports of concern from local school pupils in 1995 about the amount of rubbish and oil on the sand.

=== 21st century ===
The beach was awarded Keep Britain Tidy's Quality Coast Award in 2011. The beach was featured in the 2012 BBC drama Good Cop, filmed at and around the beach region. Sefton Council hoped the drama would promote the coastline as a location ideal for filming.

As of 2020, the annual cost by the council to fund lifeguards on the beach is £160,200, with an additional annual budget of £15,000 for maintenance works of assets the council is responsible for.

== Recreation ==
=== Another Place ===
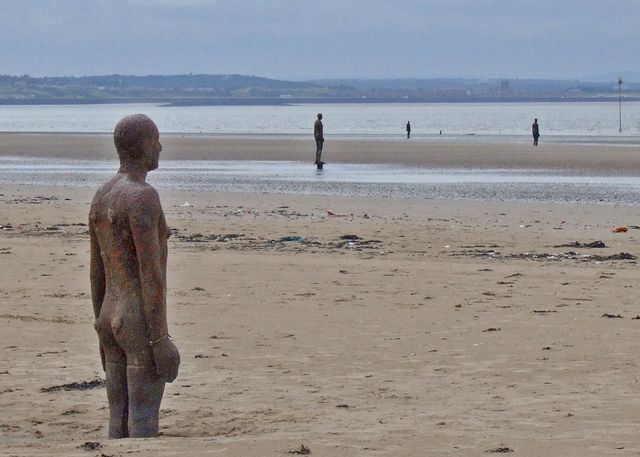
Some of the iron men from the Antony Gormley sculptures

The Another Place sculptures by Antony Gormley are found here and, after a Sefton Council meeting on 7 March 2007, it has been allowed to stay permanently. Gormley's reason for choosing Crosby Beach as the location was that he thought of the beach as being "the opposite of pretty. It is terrific and brutal and is a working beach". The sculptures were painted in June 2017 in what was described as vandalism, although several residents reacted favourably to the graffiti.

=== Waterloo Marina ===
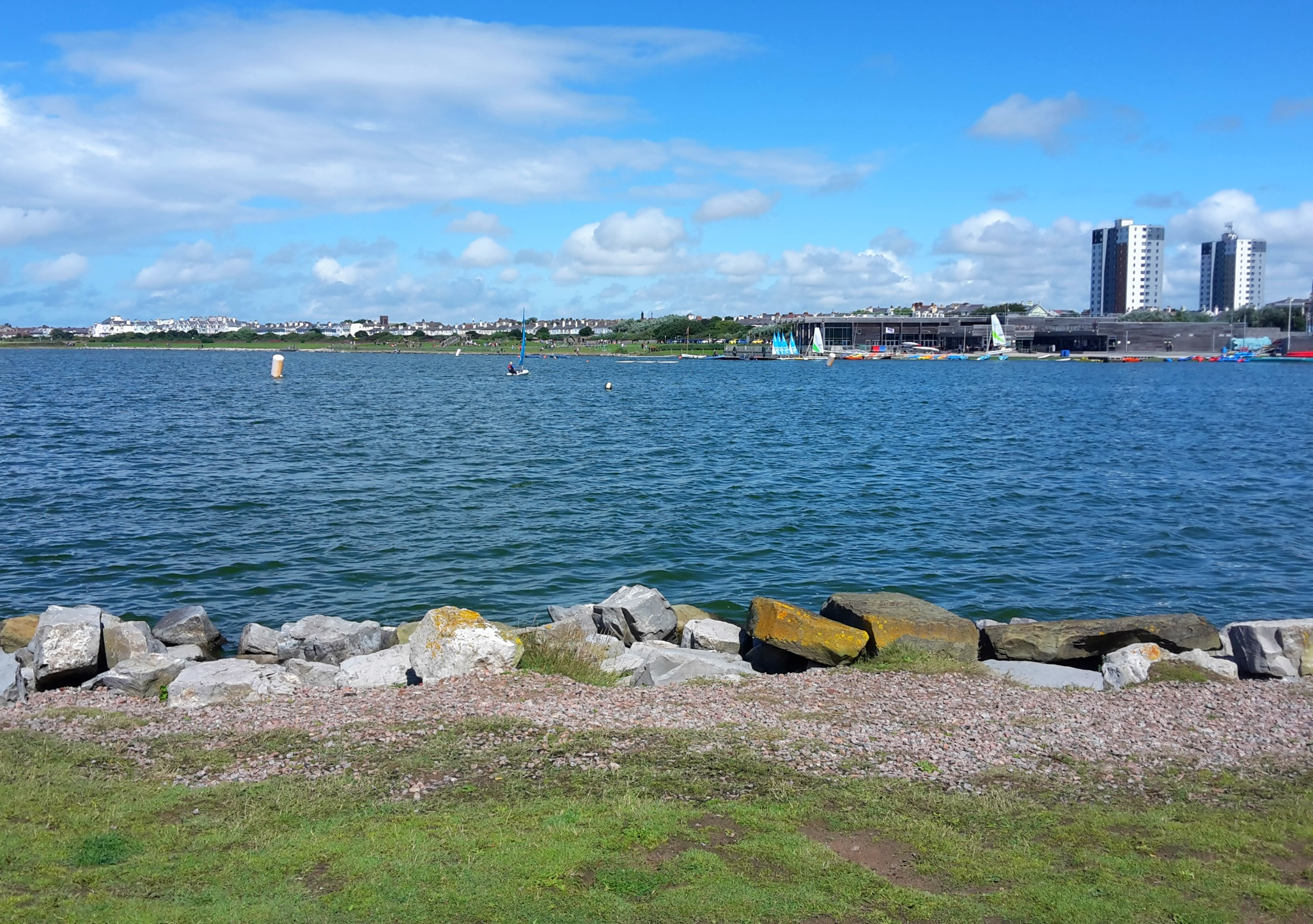
View of Waterloo Marina

Approval to construct a recreation area, including a Marina at Waterloo was approved during a Crosby electors' meeting in December 1967, with capital costs estimated at around £400,000. The proposals involved the reclamation of 161 acres (65 ha) of land between Crosby Baths and the outer wall of Seaforth Dock, with the size of the lake itself around 58 acres (23 ha). Construction started in May 1972, following the final contract for the excavation of 500,000 cubic yards (400,000 m^{3}) of sand being agreed in April. Floodlights were to be added to the marina at a cost of around £10,000. The overall cost of the marina, estimated at over £1 million, was provided by auctioning council-owned land at Crosby. At the start of the construction period, it was announced that a one-mile-long (1.6 km) pathway would be constructed around the Marina's perimeter, referred to as a promenade. The marina scheme was award-winning according to a report in February 1972, winning second prize in the 1971 Royal Institution of Chartered Surveyors and Time Conservation award scheme. It was also reported that Crosby Council had bid for financial aid towards its construction.

A million pound scheme was proposed to redevelop the nearby Marina as part of a visitor's centre for the beach and Another Place. The new centre was opening in late 2009 under the name of the Crosby Lakeside Adventure Centre, and is also home to the Crosby Scout and Guide Marina Club.

== Coastal defences ==
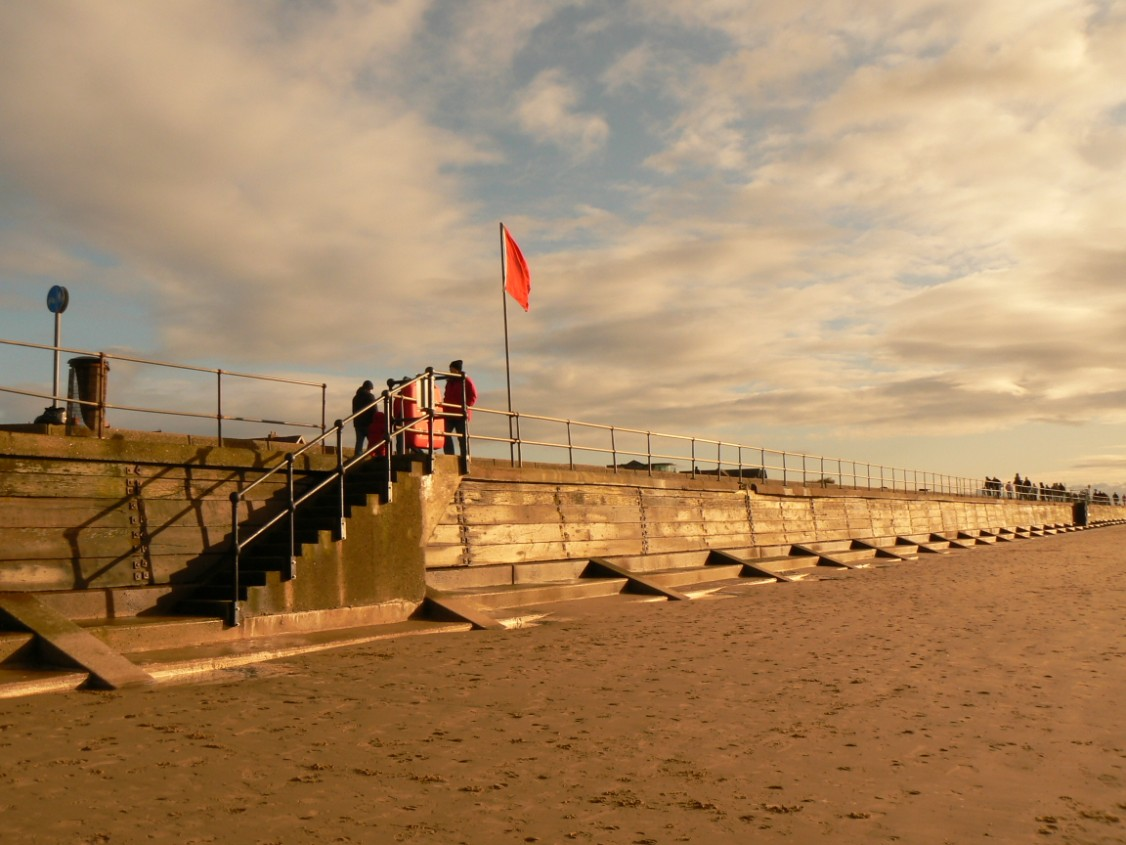
Part of the Sea Wall barrier

Dune management, including the planting of old Christmas trees and the building of a sea wall, is ongoing and have reduced the problems of high tides. Land erosion was a problem during the early 1900s, with dunes and house gardens being washed away resulting in the demolition of houses up to 1929 and measures to control the erosion introduced during the 1930s. A scheme was undertaken during the late 1960s to reclaim land in association with the Liverpool Docks, which also involved creating a Marina at Waterloo; land was extended from excavated material through the control of the Mersey Tunnel.

Throughout 2011-2012, around 4,000 tonnes (3,900 long tons; 4,400 short tons) of sand was moved from Crosby Beach further north towards the village of Hightown, in an effort to bolster coastal defences for the village; the sand dunes are expected to last for 30 years, which also includes a rubble wall at the southern end. In 2012, Asbestos was discovered spread out over a 2-mile (3.2 km) stretch of the beach, likely originating from the remains of bombed out buildings during The Blitz, which used the bombed materials to bolster the sea wall but over time eroded and exposed the fibres.

== Safety ==
The beach has a red flag rating, typically indicating danger and for visitors to not enter the water. There have been numerous incidents over the years of visitors getting trapped in quicksand. Some incidents have been attributed to the iron men sculptures, with visitors venturing beyond the safety point to see the sculptures.

== Transport ==
Crosby Beach can be reached by foot from Waterloo (Merseyside), Blundellsands and Crosby, or Hall Road railway stations. The number 53 bus runs through South Road, Waterloo, which stops near Waterloo Station. Many people take the 10-minute walk from here to the end of South Road where the Marina begins and Crosby Beach is located over the sand dunes. There is also car parking at Crosby Leisure Centre.

== Sport ==
- A parkrun takes place at the beach every Saturday morning at 9 am. The course begins on the beach then proceeds along the promenade before returning, the total distance is 5 km.
- Crosby Leisure Centre is located at the beach and has an indoor swimming pool.

== Accolades ==
As of July 2017, Crosby Beach scored favourably on Trip Advisor, receiving an average rating of 4.5/5 from around 500 reviews.
