= Vicken Parsons =

British artist

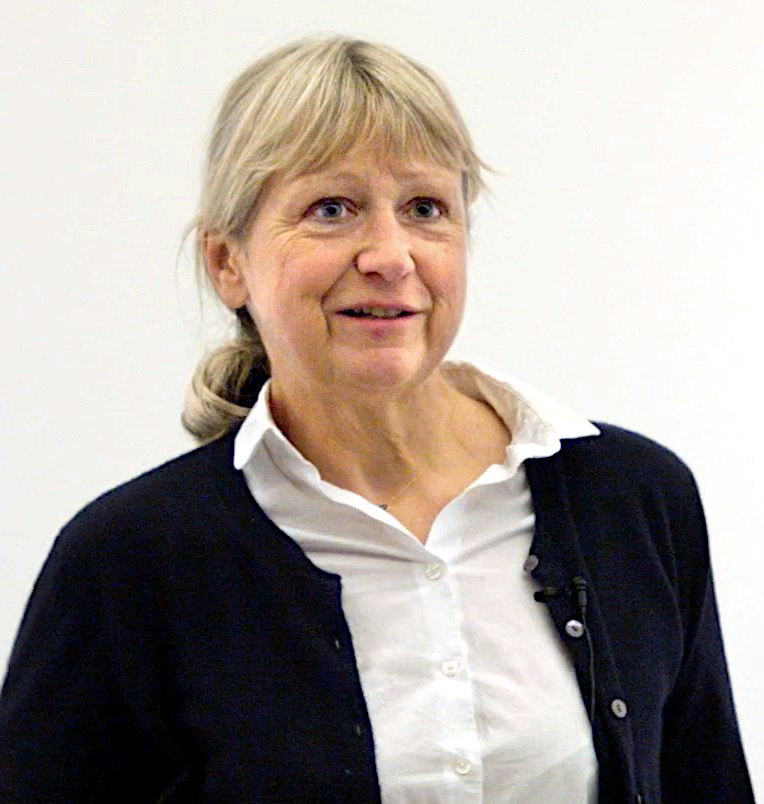
- Vicken Parsons, On Reflection, November 2017
- Born: 1957 (age 68–69)
- Occupation: Painter
- Style: Oil painting, sculpting
- Spouse: Antony Gormley (m. 1980)
- Children: 3

Vicken Parsons, Lady Gormley (born 1957), is a British artist, mostly painting in oils, but also making sculptures. Her works are displayed in Tate Britain, and are in the collections of the Arts Council and the Scottish National Gallery of Modern Art.

== Life ==
She attended the Slade School of Fine Art, in London.

== Exhibitions ==
Parsons' solo exhibitions have included Kettle's Yard, the Alan Cristea Gallery, and Tate St Ives. Her work has also been exhibited at the Royal Academy, the Institute of Contemporary Arts, Tate Modern, Southampton City Art Gallery and Kunsthalle Mannheim.

== Personal life ==
Her husband is sculptor Sir Antony Gormley. Vicken met Gormley while attending the Slade, and they married in 1980. She also worked as his assistant. Gormley said of her:

For the first 15 years she was my primary assistant. She did all of the body moulding... I think there are a lot of myths that art is made by, usually, lone men... I just feel so lucky and so blessed really, that I have such a strong supporter, and lover, and fellow artist.

The couple live in a converted gas holder in King's Cross, London. They have three children, a daughter and two sons.
