= Antony Gormley =

British sculptor (born 1950)

Sir Antony Gormley CH OBE RA
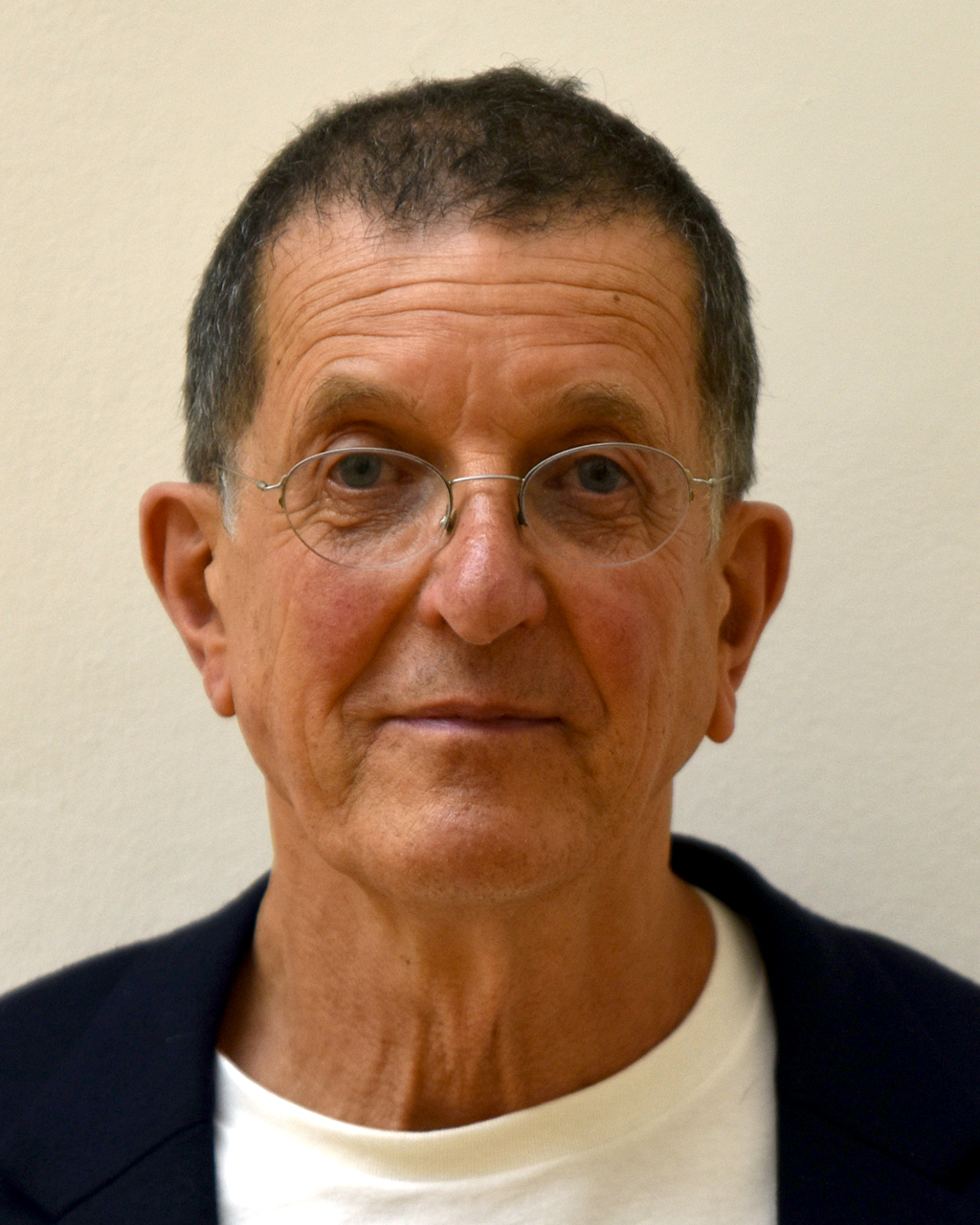
- Gormley in 2024
- Born: Antony Mark David Gormley; 30 August 1950 (age 76); Hampstead, London, England
- Education: Trinity College, Cambridge; Saint Martin's School of Art; Goldsmiths, University of London; Slade School of Fine Art
- Known for: Sculpture, installation art, public artworks
- Spouse: Vicken Parsons (m. 1980)
- Children: 3
- Awards: Turner Prize (1994); South Bank Prize for Visual Art (1999); Bernhard Heiliger Award for Sculpture (2007); Obayashi Prize (2012); Praemium Imperiale for Sculpture (2013); Marsh Award for Excellence in Public Sculpture (2015)
- Website: www.antonygormley.com

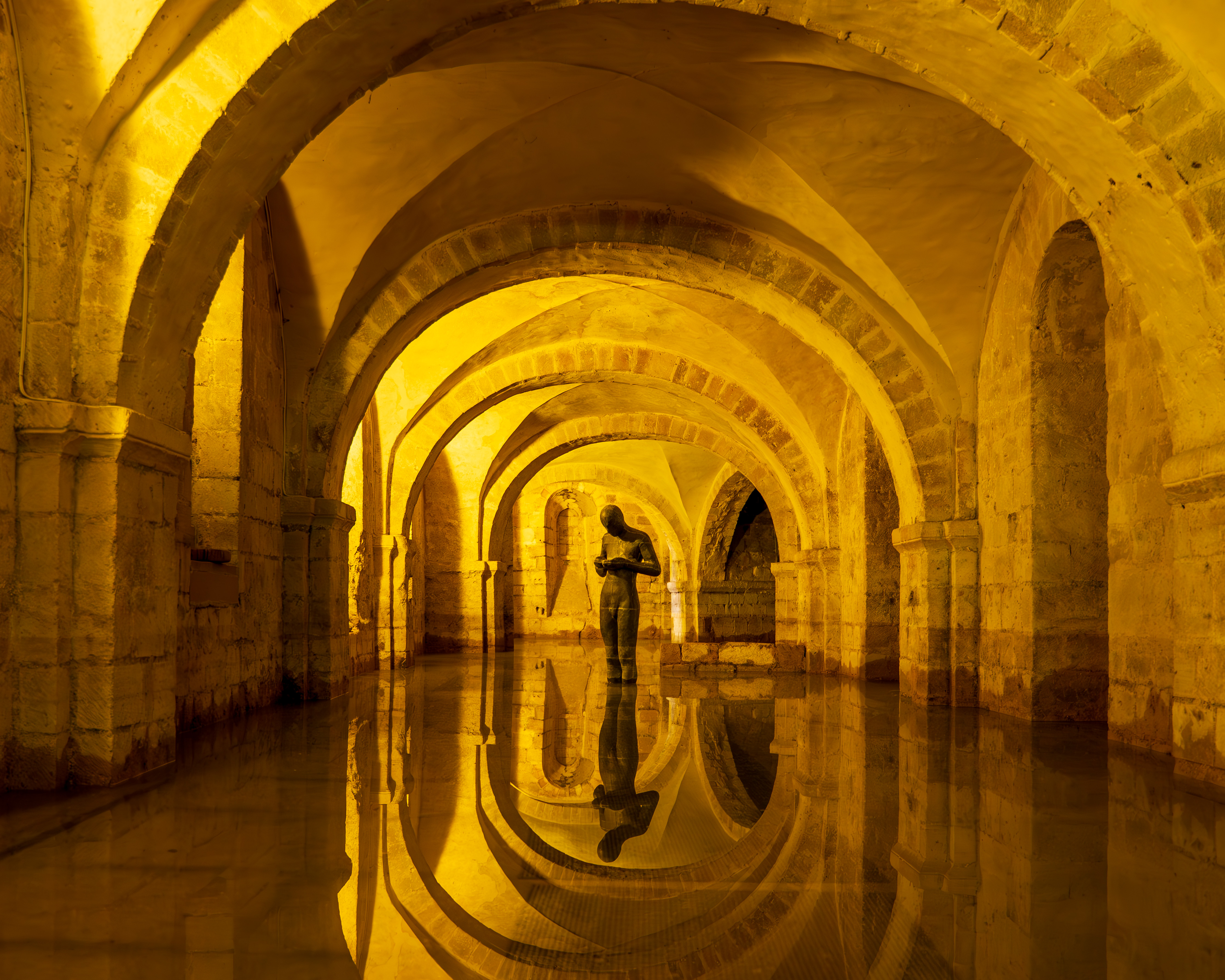
Gormley's Sound II in the crypt beneath Winchester Cathedral

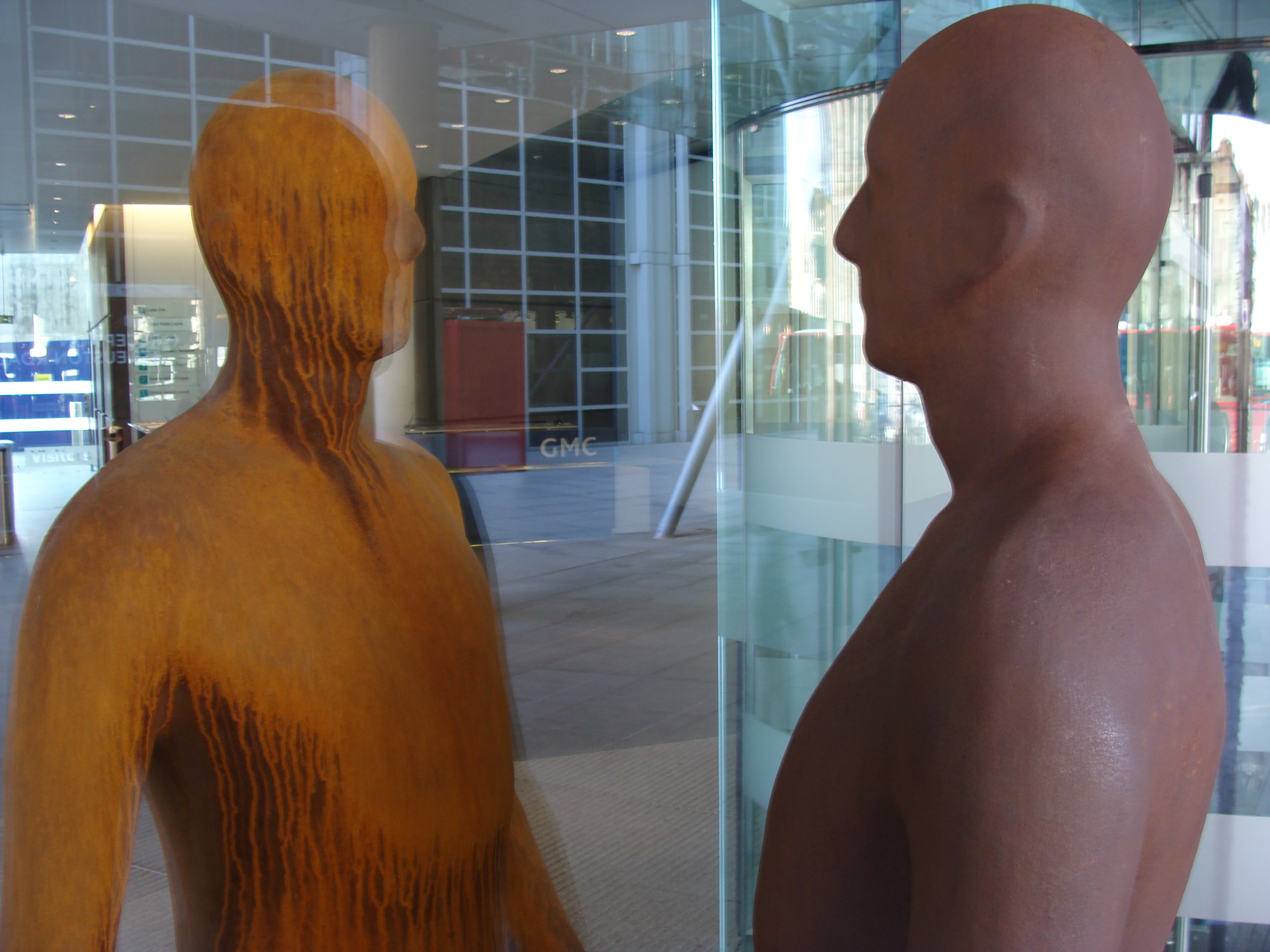
Pair of figures separated by plate glass, Regent's Place, London

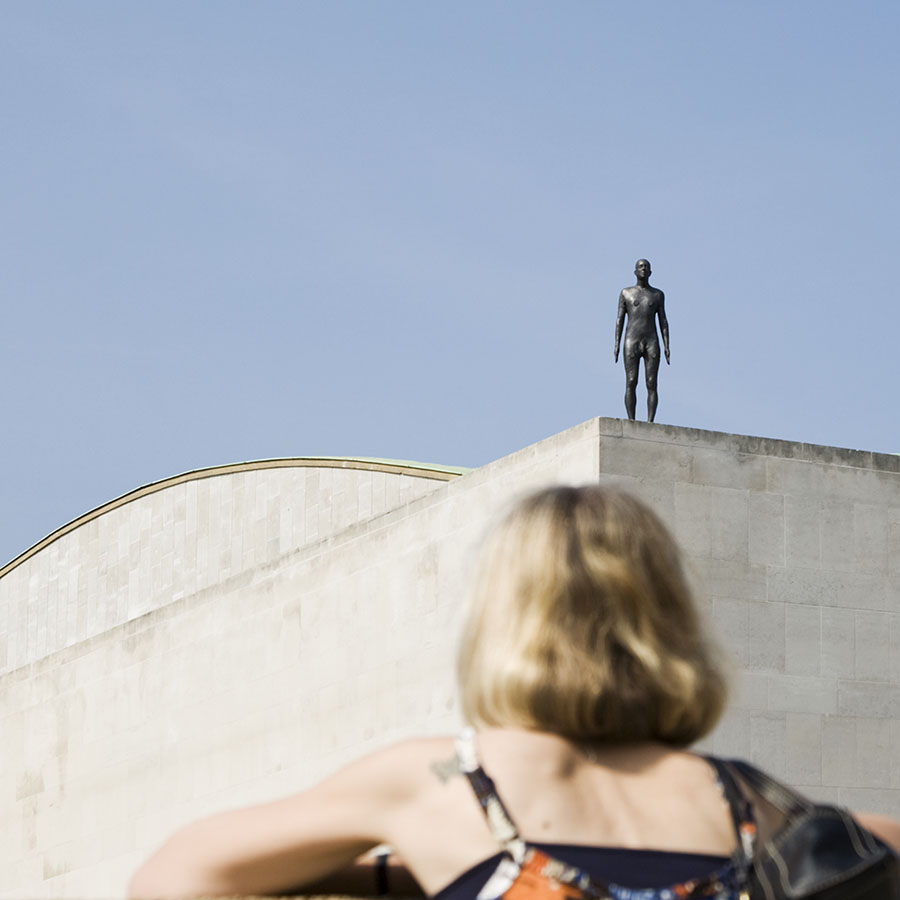
One of 31 life-sized figures on London's skyline in Event Horizon

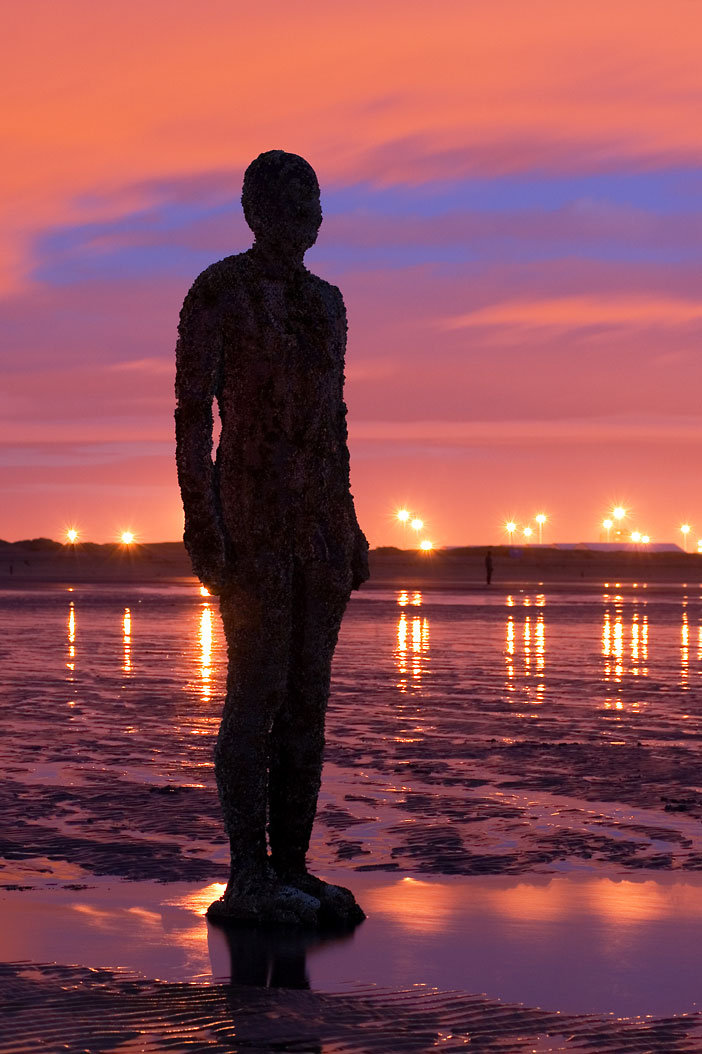
Another Place (1997) where 100 cast-iron figures face out to sea on Crosby Beach, near Liverpool

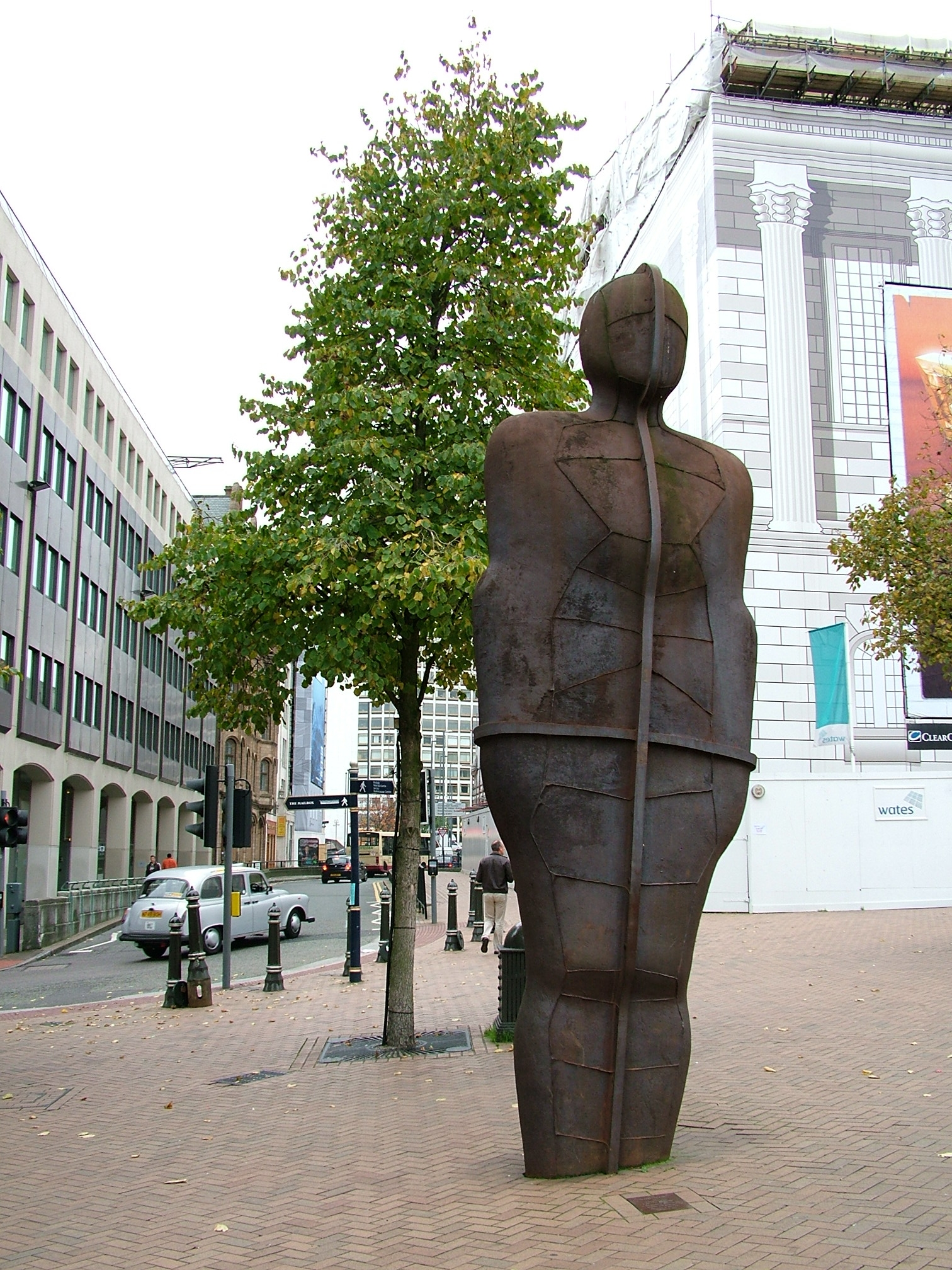
Iron: Man (1993), in its former location in Victoria Square, Birmingham. It has since been relocated, nearby

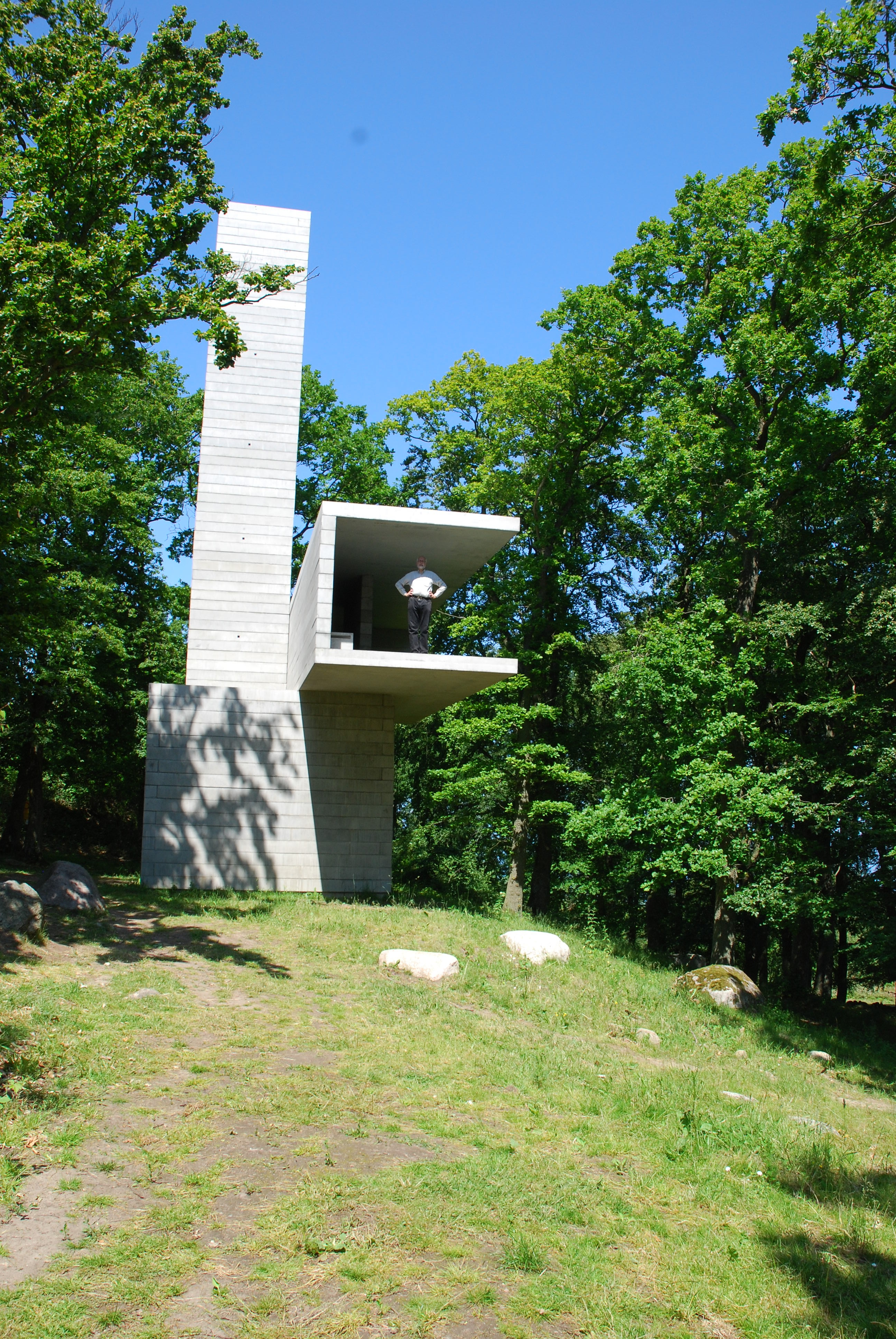
Antony Gormley and David Chipperfield's Sculpture for an objective experience of architecture (2008), Kivik Art Centre, Sweden

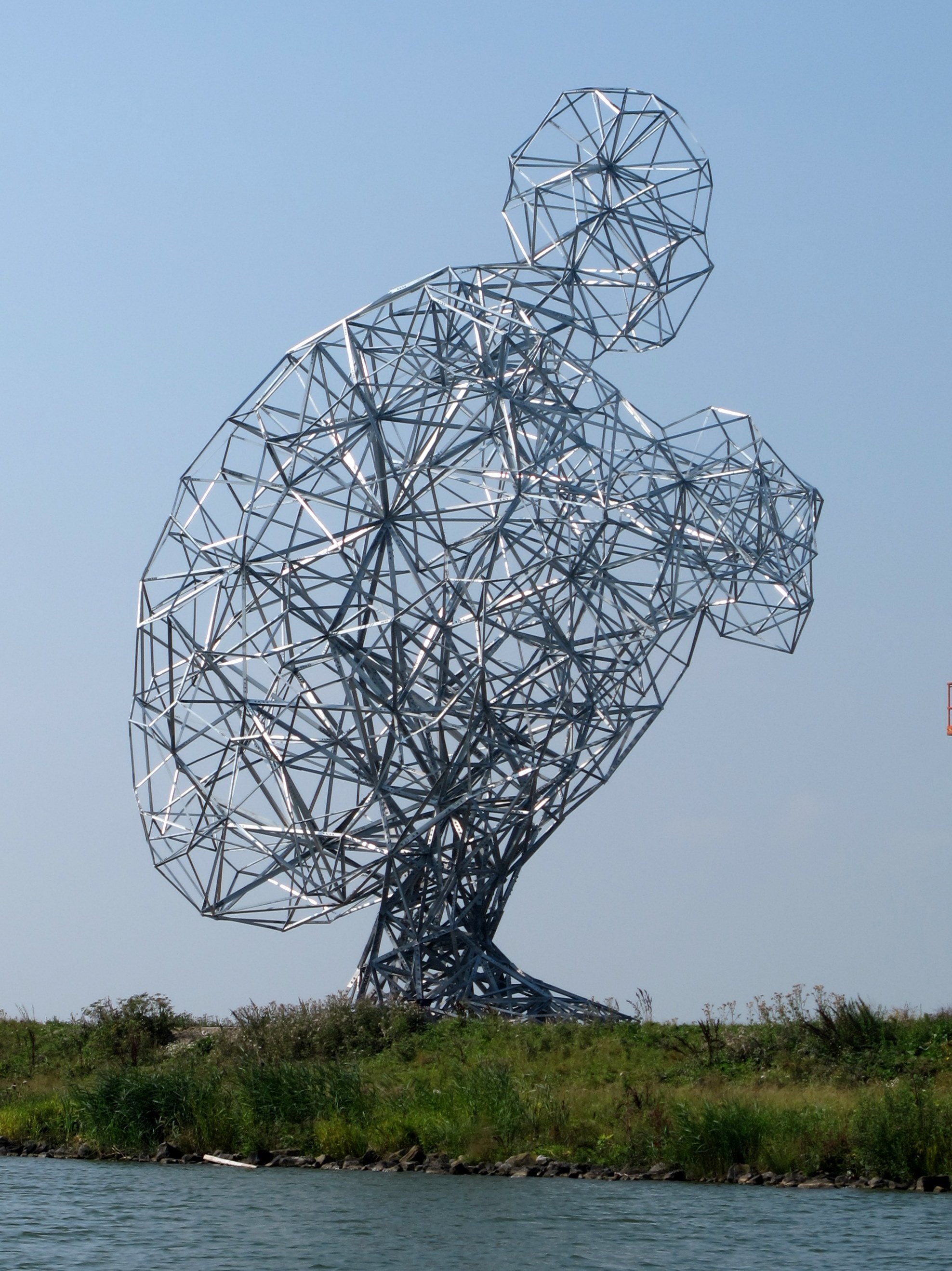
Exposure (2010), in Lelystad, the Netherlands

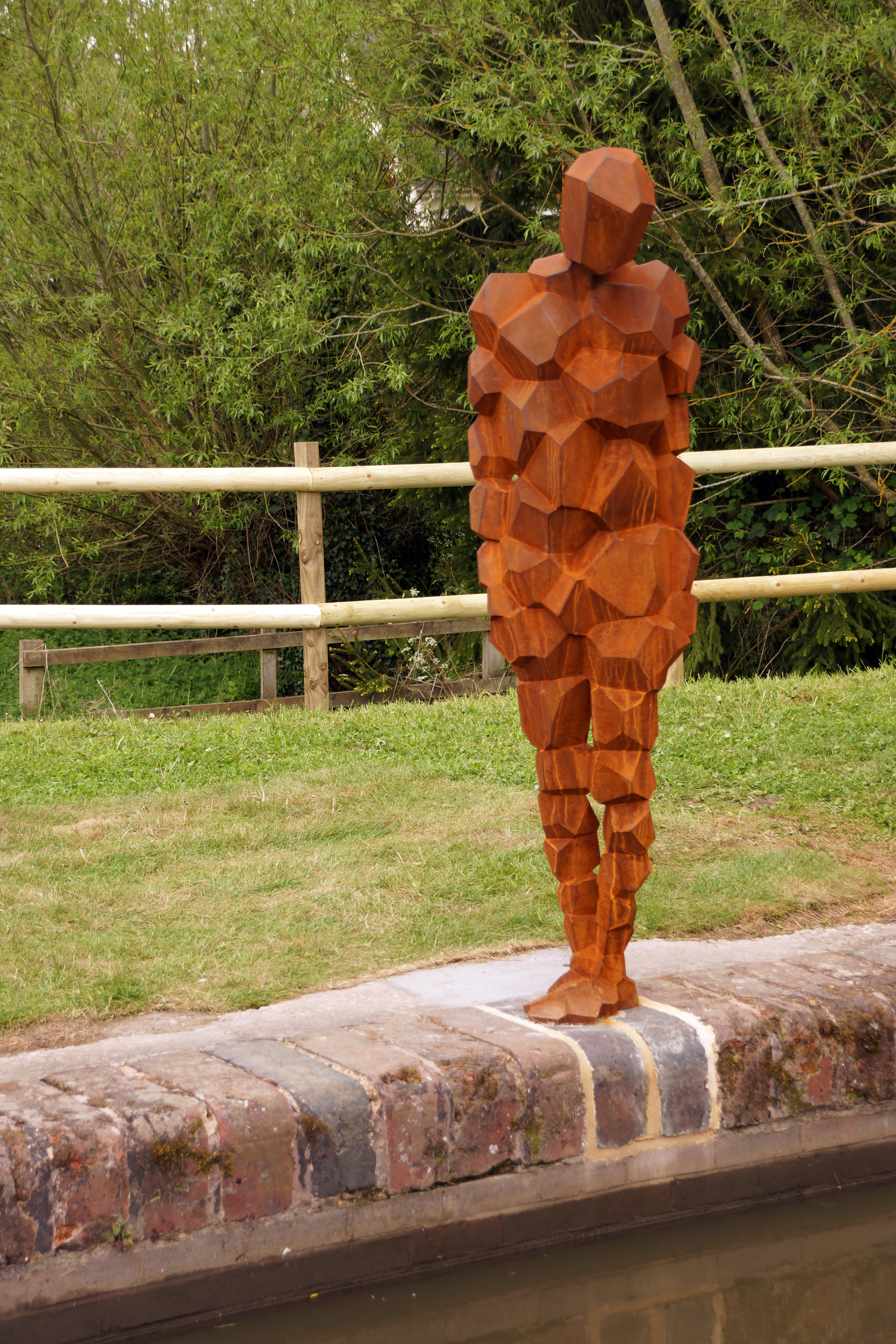
Land at Lowsonford, 2015

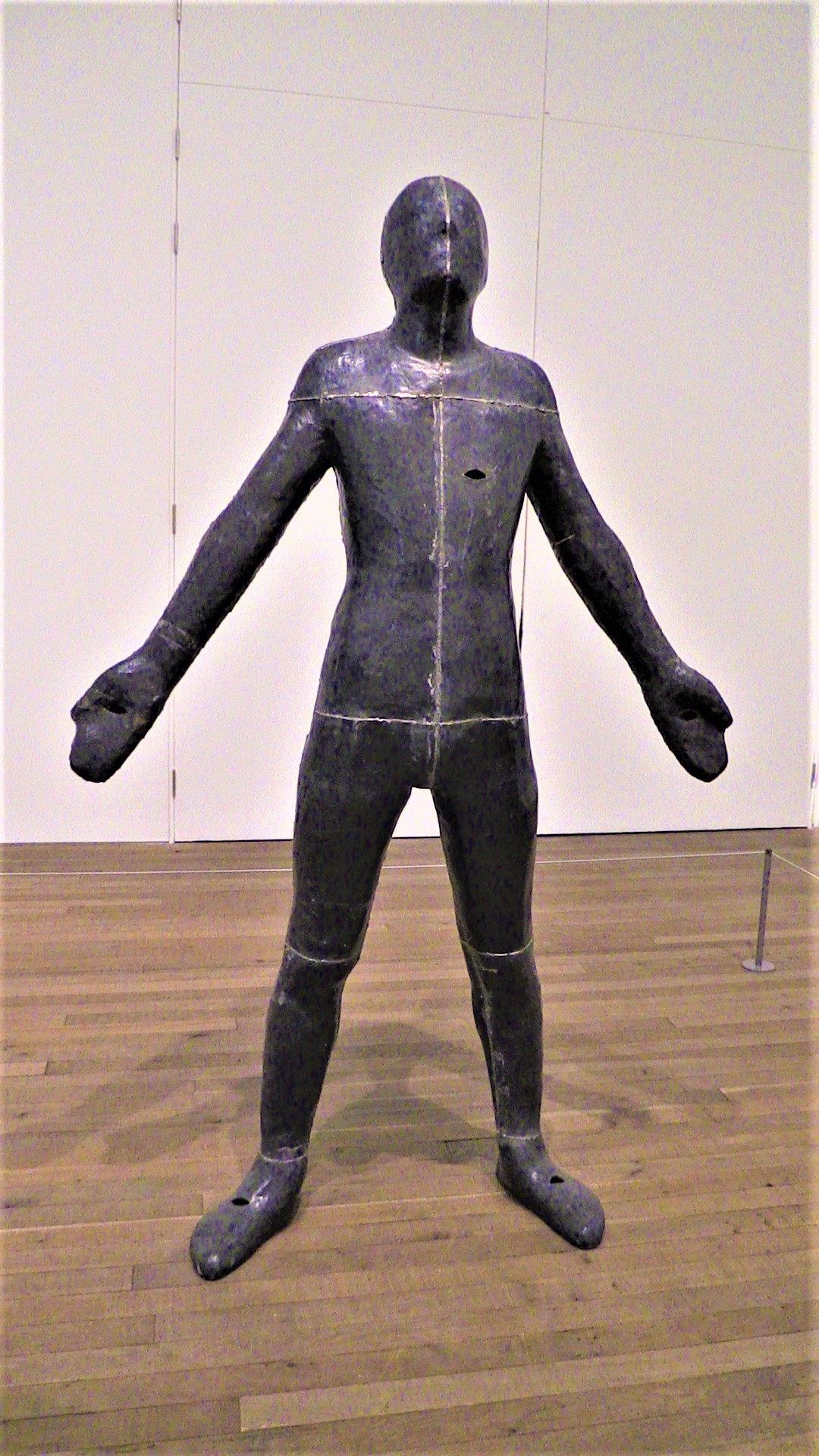
Untitled (for Francis) 1985 at the Tate Modern

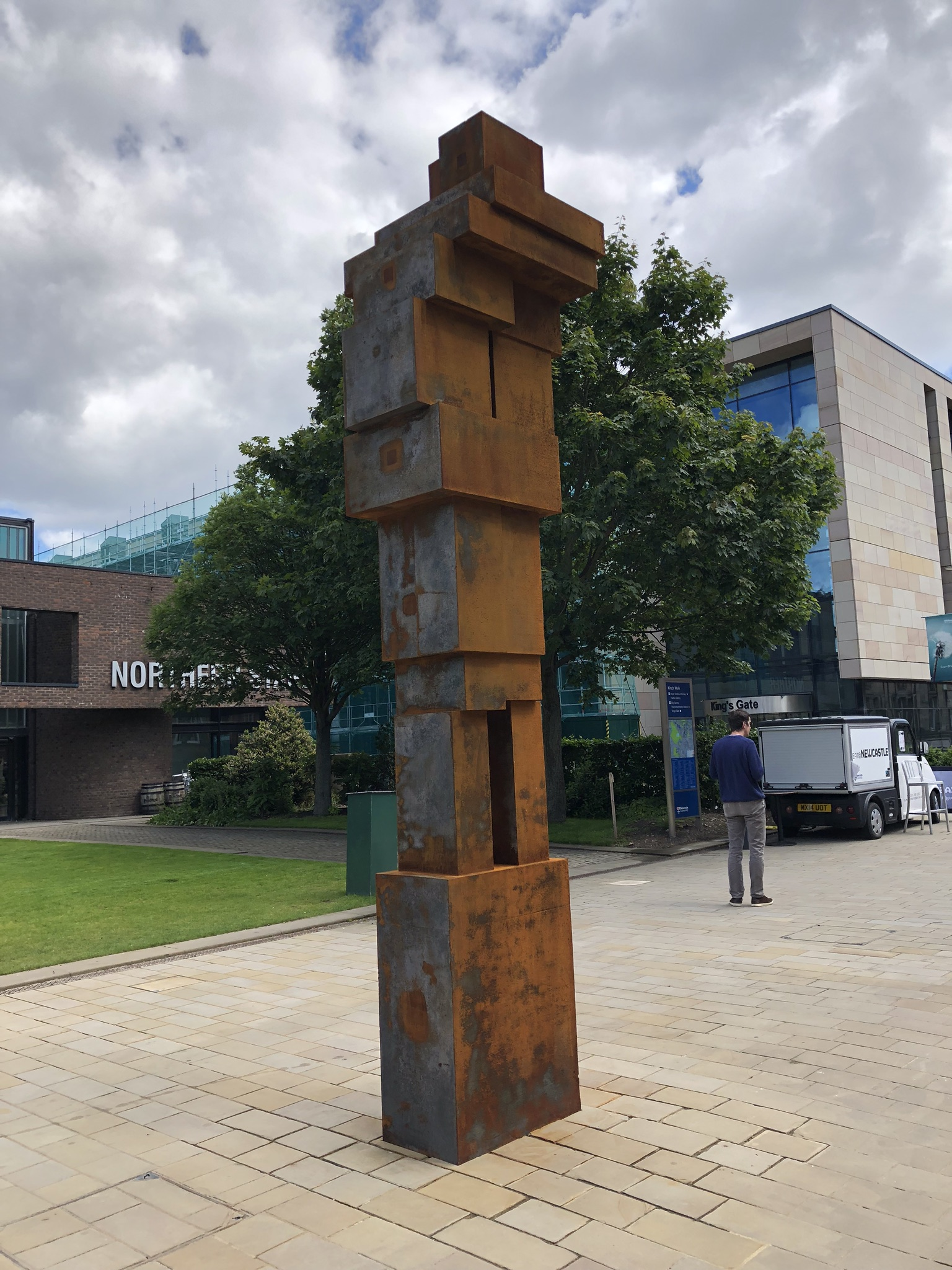
Clasp at Newcastle University, 2018

Sir Antony Mark David Gormley (born 30 August 1950) is a British sculptor. His works include the Angel of the North, a public sculpture in Gateshead in the north of England, commissioned in 1994 and erected in February 1998; Another Place on Crosby Beach near Liverpool; and Event Horizon, a multipart site installation which premiered in London in 2007, then subsequently in Madison Square in New York City (2010), São Paulo (2012) and Hong Kong (2015–16).

== Early life ==
Gormley was born in Hampstead, London, the youngest of seven children, to a German mother (maiden name Brauninger) and a father of Irish descent. His paternal grandfather was an Irish Catholic from Derry who settled in Walsall in Staffordshire. The ancestral homeland of the Gormley Clan (Irish: Ó Goirmleadhaigh) in Ulster was east County Donegal and west County Tyrone, with most people in both Derry and Strabane being of County Donegal origin. Gormley has stated that his parents chose his initials, "AMDG", to have the inference Ad maiorem Dei gloriam – "to the greater glory of God".

Gormley grew up in a Roman Catholic family living in Hampstead Garden Suburb. The family was wealthy, with a cook and a chauffeur, with a home overlooking the golf course; Gormley's father was an art lover.

Gormley attended Ampleforth College, a Benedictine boarding school in Yorkshire, before reading Archaeology, Anthropology, and the History of Art at Trinity College, Cambridge, from 1968 to 1971. He travelled to India and the Dominion of Ceylon / Sri Lanka to learn more about Buddhism between 1971 and 1974. When Gormley returned to England, and inspired by his time in India, he made one of his first artworks, Sleeping Place, by laying a plaster-soaked sheet over a friend. Its hollow plaster shell hinted at the form of a body and recalled the people Gormley saw asleep in India wrapped in saris or dhotis.

After attending Saint Martin's School of Art and Goldsmiths in London from 1974, he completed his studies with a postgraduate course in sculpture at the Slade School of Fine Art, between 1977 and 1979. Gormley's work as a student used natural materials such as stone and wood.

== Career ==
Gormley's career began with a solo exhibition at the Whitechapel Gallery in 1981. In this exhibition, Gormley showed a series of works that were concerned with surfaces, skins and inner structures, such as Natural Selection, a 10-metre (33 ft) row of objects, including tools, fruits, weapons and vegetables, encased in lead, and Room, an enclosure reminiscent of a barbed-wire fence made from a set of the artist's clothes.

Gormley then turned his attention to the human body, creating moulds of his own body in plaster that he would then encase in lead. These works, such as the three-part sculptures Three Ways: Mould Hole and Passage and Land Sea and Air II, as well as the single body-case works Plateau, Night and Peer, attempt to investigate the body as a space. In Gormley's words: "How to make bodies into vessels that both contain and occupy space? The early three-piece lead works are the first works in which I used my own body. I was trying to map out the phenomenology of the body and to find a new way of evoking it as being less a thing, more a place; a site of transformation, and an axis of physical and spatial experience." Throughout the 1980s, Gormley's lead body-cases were extended, suspended, sealed, pierced and also doubled into two joined forms.

Gormley describes his work as "an attempt to materialise the place at the other side of appearance where we all live." His work attempts to treat the body not as an object, but as a place and in making works that enclose the space of a particular body to identify a condition common to all human beings. The work is not symbolic but indexical – a trace of a real event of a real body in time.

In the 1990s, the hollow body-cases became solid, with Gormley casting the work in iron to create masses that displace space. One of these works, Critical Mass II, was installed in an old tram storage station in Vienna. Comprising 60 life-size sculptures, all presented in a variety of positions and poses, the work has been described by Gormley as "an anti-monument to the victims of the 20th century". This work has since been exhibited in a variety of countries and contexts, each time reconfigured in response to its environment. Notable presentations include the Royal Academy of Arts in London, Art Changsha in China and Forte di Belvedere in Florence, Italy.

The 2006 Sydney Biennale featured Gormley's Asian Field, an installation of approximately 200,000 small clay figurines crafted by around 300 Chinese villagers in five days from 100 tons of red clay. Use of others' works attracted minor comment. Some figurines were stolen. Also in 2006, the burning of Gormley's 25-metre-tall (82 ft) The Waste Man formed the zenith of the Margate Exodus. Other collaborative projects include Clay and the Collective Body, Inside Australia, Domain Field and Gormley's ongoing Field works, including Asian Field, Amazonian Field, American Field, Field for the Art Gallery of New South Wales and Field for the British Isles.

In 2007 Gormley's Event Horizon, consisting of 31 life-sized and anatomically correct casts of his body, four in cast iron and 27 in fiberglass, was installed on top of prominent buildings along London's South Bank, and placed in locations around New York City's Madison Square in 2010. Critic Howard Halle said that "Using distance and attendant shifts of scale within the very fabric of the city, [Event Horizon] creates a metaphor for urban life and all the contradictory associations – alienation, ambition, anonymity, fame – it entails."

In July 2009, Gormley presented One & Other, a Fourth Plinth commission, an invitation for members of the public, chosen by lot, to spend one hour on the vacant plinth in Trafalgar Square in London. This "living art" happening initially attracted much media attention. It even became a topic of discussion on the long-running BBC radio drama series The Archers, where Gormley made an appearance as himself.

Throughout the 2000s, Gormley has interrogated the relationship between the human body and architecture, notably in his series of steel and iron "Blockworks". In these works, Gormley replaces anatomy with architectural blocks that recall the built environment.

From 2 June–9 September 2012, The Phillips Collection exhibited Antony Gormley Drawing Space. It was his first U.S. museum exhibition of his works on paper; the exhibit "... included approximately 80 prints and drawings created over 40 years."

In March 2014, Gormley appeared in the BBC Four series What Do Artists Do All Day? in an episode that followed his team and him in their Kings Cross studio, preparing a new work – a group of 60 enormous steel figures – called Expansion Field. The work was shown at the Zentrum Paul Klee in Bern.

In May 2015 five life-sized sculptures, Land, were placed near the centre and at four compass points of the UK in a commission by the Landmark Trust to celebrate its 50th anniversary. They are at Lowsonford (Warwickshire), Lundy (Bristol Channel), Saddell Bay (Scotland), the Martello Tower (Aldeburgh, Suffolk), and Clavell Tower (Kimmeridge Bay, Dorset). The Dorset sculpture was knocked over into Kimmeridge Bay by a storm in September 2015.

On 6 September 2015, Another Place marked the 10th anniversary of its installation at Crosby Beach in Merseyside. Gormley commented:

I'm just delighted by the barnacles!
Every time I'm there, just like any other visitor, you're encouraged to linger a bit longer seeing the tide come in and how many of them disappear. And then you're encouraged to linger further until they're revealed again.

In September 2015, Gormley had his first sculpture installed in New Zealand. Stay is a group of identical cast-iron human form sculptures, with the first installed in the Avon River / Ōtākaro in Christchurch's central city, and the other sculpture installed in the nearby Arts Centre in early 2016.

In 2015 at the Forte di Belvedere in Florence, Gormley presented a group of cast iron works that acted as points of "acupuncture" throughout the historical fortress. Gormley returned to Florence in 2018 with the exhibition Essere at the Uffizi Gallery. The exhibition featured both historical and recent work, notably Room from 1980, Sense from 1991 and Passage from 2016.

In 2017 Gormley curated Inside, an exhibition at the Southbank Centre, London, presented by the Koestler Trust showing artworks by prisoners, detainees, and ex-offenders. In addition, he judged their annual category prize, also on the theme "inside".

Gormley then held the first solo exhibition at the newly remodelled Kettle's Yard in Cambridge. Two new bodies of work, known as Rooters and Polyhedra Works, were shown that year at White Cube in Hong Kong and Thaddaeus Ropac in Salzburg, respectively.

On 21 April 2018, Gormley released a limited edition vinyl album of ambient sounds from his studio for Record Store Day titled Sounds of the Studio. It consisted of two tracks (one on each side) titled Sounds of the Studio (Part 1) and Sounds of the Studio (Part 2). It came with an inner with a monochrome print of his studio on one side and text by the artist with a photo on the other.

In 2019 Gormley populated the island of Delos with iron "bodyforms" with the exhibition Sight. Organised and commissioned by the NEON Organization, co-curated by Iwona Blazwick and Elina Kountouri and presented in collaboration with the Ephorate of Antiquities of Cyclades, the project marked the first time that an artist took over the archaeological site of Delos since the island was inhabited more than 5,000 years ago, and is the first time a contemporary art installation has been unanimously approved by the Greek Archaeological Council of the Ministry of Culture to take place in Delos, a UNESCO World Heritage Site. He installed 29 sculptures made during the last 20 years, including five new works specially commissioned by the NEON Organization, both at the periphery and integrated amongst Delos's archaeological site and museum, animating the geological and archaeological features of the island.

Also in 2019, the Royal Academy held an exhibition filling its 13 main galleries with Gormley's works, including some new (designed to fit the space), some remade for the gallery, and some of his early sculptures, with two rooms of his drawings and sketchbooks.

In 2020 Gormley was confirmed to be "lending" a sculpture to Kirklees College to sit atop its new building at Pioneer House in Dewsbury, as part of a major redevelopment in the town.

In 2022 a Gormley sculpture called Alert was installed on the main campus of Imperial College London. The installation raised objections from the student body due to its perceived "phallic" interpretation.

That year, Gormley also held exhibitions at Xavier Hufkens in Brussels, Lehmbruck Museum in Duisburg, Germany and Museum Voorlinden in Wassenaar, the Netherlands. In Duisburg, his work was placed in dialogue with Wilhelm Lehmbruck's expressionistic, elongated sculptures. Gormley's Reflection II has remained on display at the museum.

In 2023 Gormley opened a number of large-scale exhibitions, including Living Time at TAG Art Museum in Qingdao, China, and Critical Mass at Musée Rodin in Paris, which marked the first time that a living artist has been invited to exhibit in all areas of the museum, including the Hôtel Biron. As part of the exhibition, Gormley showed his major artwork Critical Mass II, a sculpture comprising 60 cast iron bodies, in and around the museum and its grounds. Inside the Hôtel Biron, Gormley placed four sculptures in dialogue with Rodin's own work and also selected a number of his working models to be seen alongside Rodin's plaster maquettes. Later in the year, Gormley opened Body Politic at White Cube in London, a solo exhibition of new sculptures responding to themes of movement and containment, as well as the topic of migration. As part of the exhibition, a new installation, Resting Place, filled a room with 244 bodies built from fired bricks, and a row of what the artist calls concrete "bunkers" ran down the gallery's central corridor.

In 2024 Time Horizon, an installation of 100 cast iron sculptures, opened at Houghton Hall in Norfolk. The installation responded to the specific landscape of the parkland and the history of the hall. Gormley also unveiled True, for Alan Turing at King's College, Cambridge. This sculpture, made from slabs of Corten steel, celebrates the life and enduring influence of mathematician and computer scientist Alan Turing. Speaking on the sculpture, Gormley stated "Alan Turing unlocked the door between the industrial and the information ages. I wanted to make the best sculpture I could to honour a man who was pivotal in changing the course of all our lives. It is not about the memorialisation of a death, but about a celebration of the opportunities that a life allowed".

Gormley's first solo exhibition in New York City in more than eight years opened at White Cube and ran until June 2024. The artist exhibited a new site-specific installation titled Aerial, from which the exhibition took its name. This sculpture was made from horizontal and vertical aluminium bars that filled the room like "whiskers" and visitors were invited to enter and find their way through this space.

In the spring of 2025 Gormley returned to Delos with Rule II, a donation along with NEON Organization, following an invitation by the Ministry of Culture. The sculpture is the first contemporary artwork to be permanently exhibited in an archaeological site in Greece and is placed outdoors at the Archaeological Museum of Delos facing the archaeological site.

From 13 September 2025 to 4 January 2026, the Nasher Sculpture Center in Dallas is exhibiting Survey: Antony Gormley, the first major exhibition of his work in the United States. The exhibit spanned the breath of Gormley's work. In conjunction with the exhibit, Gormley installed works on the rooftops of skyscrapers in and around downtown Dallas.

== Recognition ==
Gormley won the Turner Prize in 1994 with Field for the British Isles.

Gormley has been a Royal Academician since 2003, and was a trustee of the British Museum from 2007 to 2015. He is an honorary fellow of the Royal Society of Arts and the Royal Institute of British Architects, honorary doctor of the universities of Teesside, Liverpool, University College London, and Cambridge, and a fellow of Trinity and Jesus Colleges, Cambridge. In October 2010, along with 100 other leading artists, he signed an open letter to then Culture Minister Jeremy Hunt protesting cutbacks in the arts.

On 13 March 2011, Gormley was awarded the Laurence Olivier Award for Outstanding Achievement in Dance for the set design for Babel (Words) at Sadler's Wells in collaboration with Sidi Larbi Cherkaoui and Damien Jalet. He was the recipient of the Obayashi Prize in 2012 and is the 2013 Praemium Imperiale laureate for sculpture. Gormley was knighted in the 2014 New Year Honours for services to the arts, having previously been appointed OBE in 1998.

For Room he received the 2015 Marsh Award for Excellence in Public Sculpture.

In 2008 The Daily Telegraph ranked Gormley number four in their list of the "100 most powerful people in British culture".

In June 2025, Gormley was appointed a Companion of Honour in the Birthday Honours by King Charles III.

== Collections ==
Gormley's work is held in major public and private collections around the world, including the Arts Council of England; Tate, London; British Museum, London; British Council, England; National Galleries of Scotland, Edinburgh; Royal Academy of Arts, London; Victoria and Albert Museum, London; Wellcome Collection, London; Art Gallery of New South Wales, Sydney; National Gallery of Australia, Canberra; Middelheim Museum, Antwerp; Louisiana Museum of Modern Art, Humblebaek; Centre Georges Pompidou, Paris; Lehmbruck Museum, Duisburg; SCHAUWERK Sindelfingen, Sindelfingen; M+, Hong Kong; Irish Museum of Modern Art, Dublin; Uffizi Gallery, Florence; National Museum of Modern Art, Tokyo; Museum Voorlinden, Wassenaar; State Hermitage Museum, St. Petersburg; Malmo Konsthall, Malmo; Pinchuk Art Centre, Kyiv; MIT List Visual Arts Center, Cambridge, Massachusetts; Museum of Contemporary Art, Los Angeles; Phillips Collection, Washington D.C.; San Francisco Museum of Modern Art, San Francisco; Walker Art Center, Minneapolis, Minnesota; Frederik Meijer Gardens & Sculpture Park, Grand Rapids, Michigan; and Yale Center for British Art, New Haven, Connecticut.

== Art market ==
Gormley's auction record is £5,296,250 ($6,919,621) for A Case for an Angel I (1989), sold at Christie's London, on 6 October 2017. The previous record was £3,401,250 for a maquette of the Angel of the North, set also at Christie's, on 14 October 2011.

== Personal life ==
While at the Slade School of Fine Art, Gormley met Vicken Parsons, who was to become his assistant, and in 1980, his wife, as well as a successful artist in her own right. The couple have a daughter and two sons, and live in a converted gasholder in King's Cross, London.

Gormley is a patron of Paintings in Hospitals, a charity that provides art for health and social care in England, Wales, and Northern Ireland.

In June 2022, Gormley said that he had applied for German citizenship, to which he is entitled through his German mother, after describing Brexit as "a practical disaster" and a "betrayal".

In 2024 he donated £500,000 to the Labour Party. It was his first political donation after previously donating to the Green Party in 2023.

== Major works ==
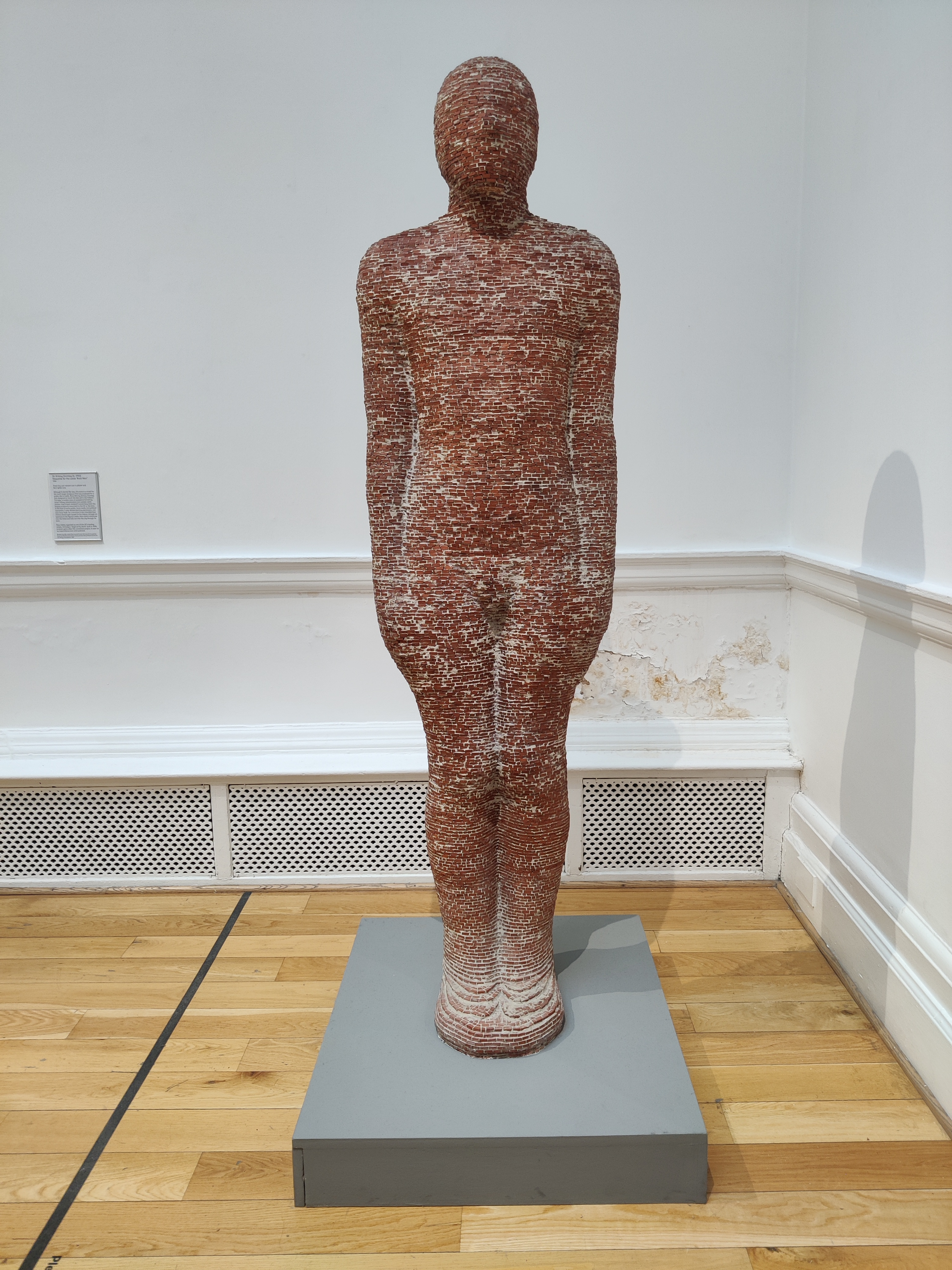
Maquette for Gormley's proposed Brick Man sculpture, at Leeds City Art Gallery

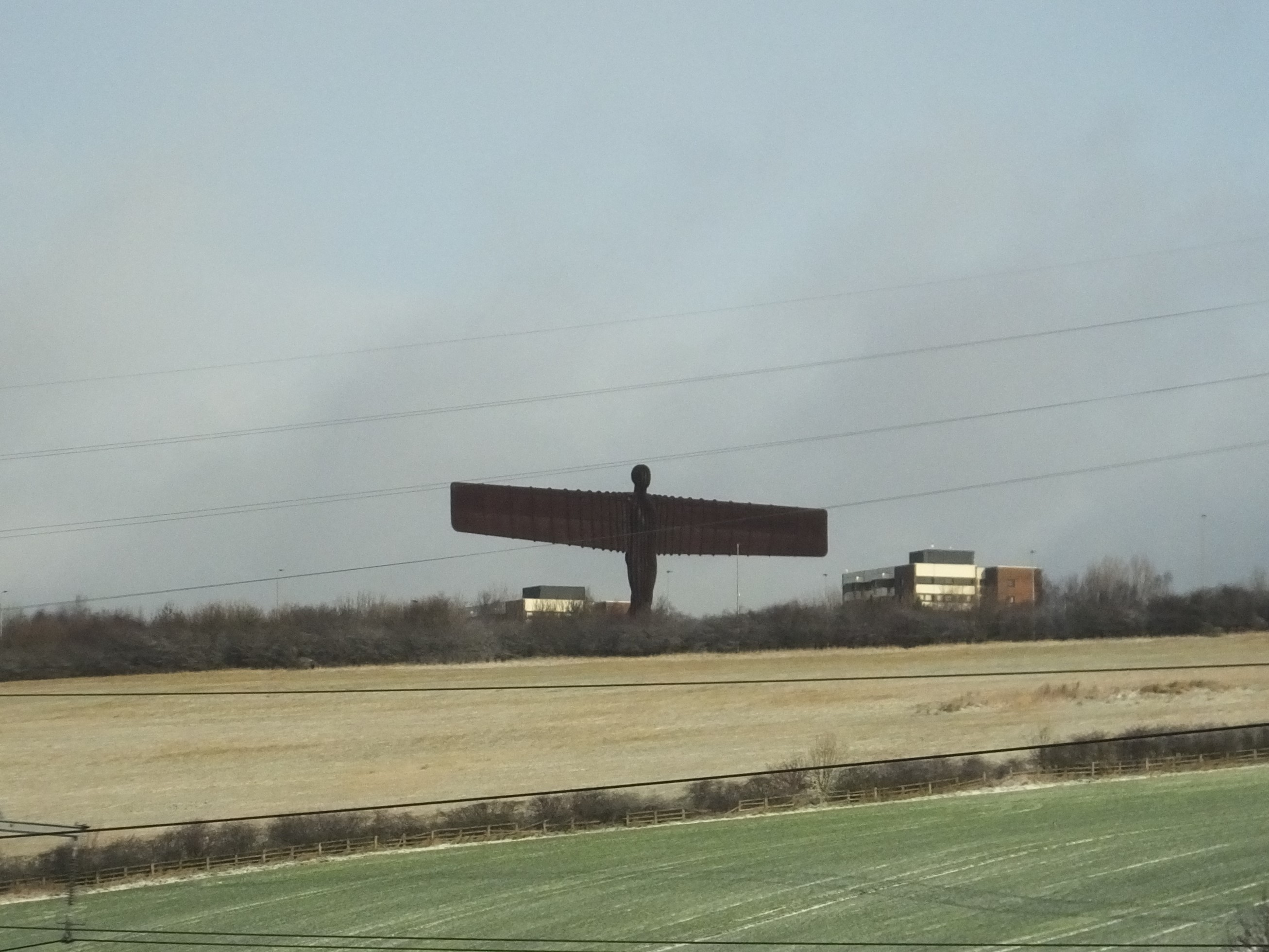
Angel of the North viewed from a train on the nearby East Coast Mainline

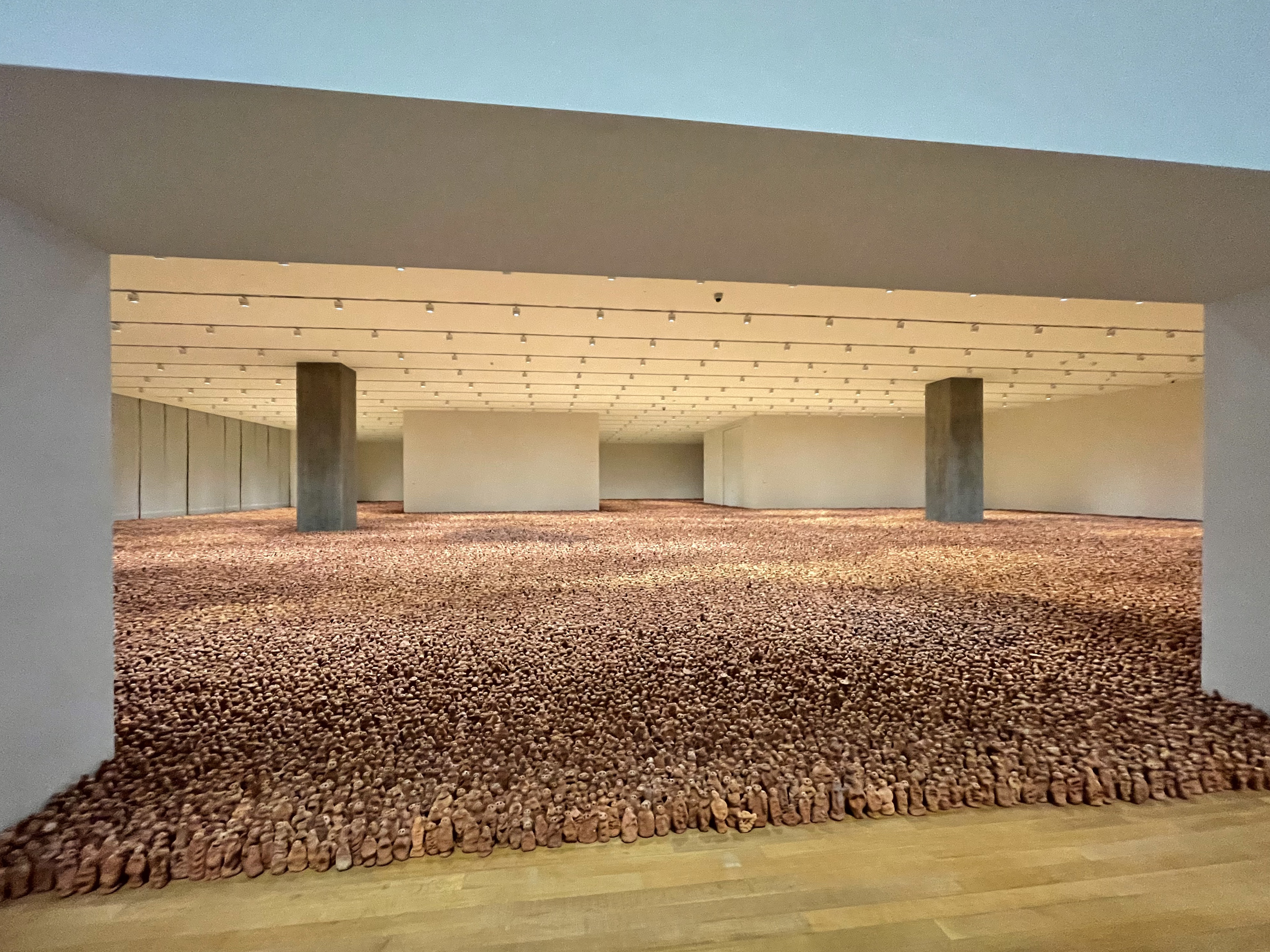
Asian Field at M+, 2021

Gormley's website includes images of nearly all of his works and exhibitions up to 2024. The most notable include:

- Two Stones (1979) – commissioned by Kent County Council; stood in Ashford, then Maidstone, before being sold back to Gormley in 2026
- Bed (1981) – purchased by the Tate Gallery
- Sound II (1986) – in the crypt of Winchester Cathedral, Winchester, Hampshire, England
- Brick Man – never commissioned, but a maquette (1986) is in Leeds City Art Gallery
- Field (1991; and subsequent recreations)
- Iron:Man (1993) – Victoria Square, Birmingham, England
- Havmann (1995) – Mo i Rana, Norway
- Another Place (1997) – permanently installed at Crosby Beach near Liverpool, England
- Quantum Cloud (1999) – Greenwich, London, England
- Broken Column (1999–2003) – Stavanger, Norway
- Angel of the North (1998) – Low Fell (overlooking the A1 and A167 roads), Gateshead, Tyne and Wear, England
- Present Time (2001) – at Mansfield College, Oxford
- Planets (2002) – at the British Library, London.
- Filter (2002) – acquired by Manchester Art Gallery, Manchester, England, in 2009
- Earthbound: Plant (2002) – McDonald Institute for Archaeological Research, Downing Site, University of Cambridge
- Inside Australia (2003) – permanent exhibition at Lake Ballard, Western Australia
- Time Horizon – the Archaeological Park of Scolacium near Catanzaro in Calabria, Southern Italy
- Ferment (2007)
- Blind Light (2007) – Hayward Gallery, South Bank, London
- Event Horizon (2007) – along the South Bank of the Thames, London, England; (2010) around Madison Square, New York City; 2012 in São Paulo, Brazil; 2015–16 in Hong Kong
- Reflection II (2008) – acquired by DeCordova Museum and Sculpture Park, Lincoln, Massachusetts, in 2009
- One & Other (6 July – 14 October 2009) – Trafalgar Square, London, England
- Another Time XI (2009) – sculpture on top of Exeter College, Oxford, overlooking Broad Street
- Horizon Field (2010–2012) – sculpture installation in the Austrian Alps
- Exposure (2010) – Lelystad, Netherlands
- Cloud Chain (2010) – Les Archives Nationales, Paris, France
- Transport (2011) – Crypt of Canterbury Cathedral, Kent, England
- Mothership with Standing Matter (2011) – Lillehammer, Norway
- Witness (2011) – on the piazza of the British Library, London; commissioned by English PEN to mark their 90th anniversary
- Horizon Field Hamburg (2012) – Deichtorhallen, Germany
- Stay (2015/16) – Christchurch, New Zealand
- DAZE IV (2016) – Sidgwick Site, University of Cambridge
- Sight (2019) – Delos Island, Mykonos, Greece; organised and commissioned by the NEON Organization and presented in collaboration with the Ephorate of Antiquities of Cyclades of the Greek Ministry of Culture and Sports
- Witness VII and Witness VIII (2021) – École du Louvre
- Alert (2022) – Imperial College London
- True, for Alan Turing (2024) – King's College, Cambridge
