= Field (sculpture) =

Sculpture by Antony Gormley

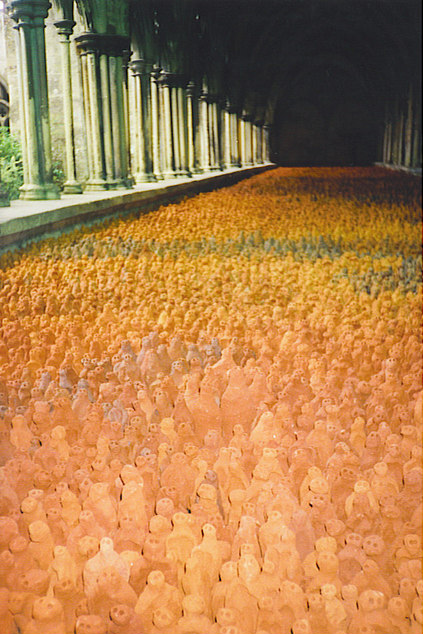
Field for the British Isles at Salisbury Cathedral in 1999

Field (1991) is a sculpture by British artist Antony Gormley. It consists of approx. 35,000 individual terracotta figures, each between 8 and 26 cm high, installed on the floor of a room facing the viewer. The figures were sculpted in Cholula, Mexico by about 60 members of a Texca family of brickmakers, under the supervision of the artist. The sculpture received much media attention upon its first display, and many affectionate parodies.

Field has been installed and displayed at various locations. The specific configuration is changed to suit each location, but the miniature figures are always placed to form a dense carpet with each figure looking towards the viewer. Ideally the Field is extended through a doorway or round a corner, so that the figures going out of sight leave the impression of an unlimited horde.

Several other versions of Field have subsequently been created, including

- Field for the Art Gallery of New South Wales (1989)
- Amazonian Field (1991) made in Porto Velho, Brazil (approx. 24,000 figures)
- Field for the British Isles (1993) made in St Helens near Liverpool in the UK (approx. 40,000 figures)
- European Field (1993) made in Östra Grevie, Sweden (approx. 40,000 figures)
- Asian Field (2003) made in Xiangshan County, Guangdong, Guangdong province, People's Republic of China (approx. 190,000 figures)

Field for the British Isles was typical in recruiting some 100 volunteers from the pupils and their extended families, of two local schools in St Helens. Each volunteer was given a portion of the 30 tonnes of clay required, along with some loose instructions specifying the rough size and proportions for the figures. An accidental feature of the original Field was that Texca family involved people aged from 6 to 60 working on the figures, and Gormley felt that the involvement of three generations of a family should be continued in all the subsequent versions.

Gormley has also made several other works entitled Field, but these are smaller groups of life size figures more typical of Gormley's earlier work.

In 1994, Gormley won the Turner prize with a collection of his work, including Field for the British Isles, shown at the Tate Gallery.
