= Transport (sculpture) =

Sculpture by Antony Gormley

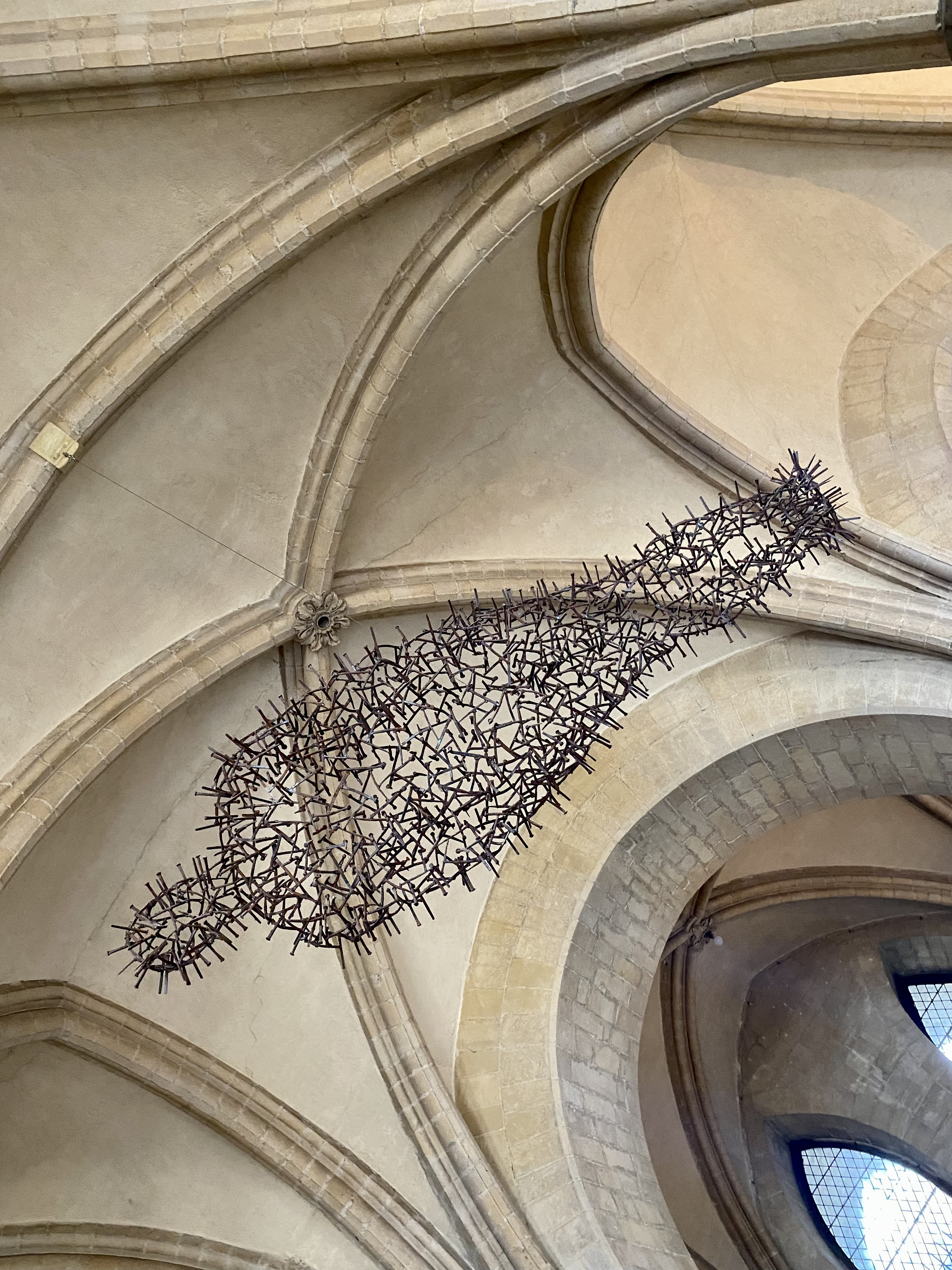
Transport in August 2022

Transport is a sculpture by Antony Gormley in the crypt of Canterbury Cathedral in Kent. It was installed in 2011 and is made from nails from the roof of the cathedral.

== Design ==
The sculpture is in the shape of a human body and is 6 feet (1.8 m) in length. It is constructed from iron nails removed from the roof of the south-east transept of the cathedral as it was undergoing repairs.

Transport is suspended from the ceiling of the crypt of the cathedral, and hangs above the location of the first tomb of Thomas Becket.

== Reception ==
Gormley said of the piece that "We are all the temporary inhabitants of a body. It is our house, instrument and medium. Through it, all impressions of the world come and from it all our acts, thoughts and feelings are communicated". The Dean of Canterbury, Robert Willis, said that "The sense of passage which the word Transport conveys tunes well with the constant movement of people through this place of prayer and creativity ... It also suggests the way in which sacred spaces communicate a sense of time and eternity, of the finite and the infinite". Reviewing the piece in The Times at the time of its unveiling, Nancy Durrant wrote that " ... contemporary artists are a secular bunch and this flickering form, both solid and at the same time delicate, has as much to do with the fragility of the Earth-bound human body and its precariousness as the home of thought, feeling and spirit as it does with any notions of doctrinal Christianity".

The relationship between Gormley's Transport and Geoffrey Chaucer's Canterbury Tales was extensively analysed by Helen Barr in her 2015 book Transporting Chaucer.
