= Another Place (sculpture) =

Sculpture by Sir Antony Gormley at Crosby Beach, England

Coordinates: 53.470°N 3.046°W

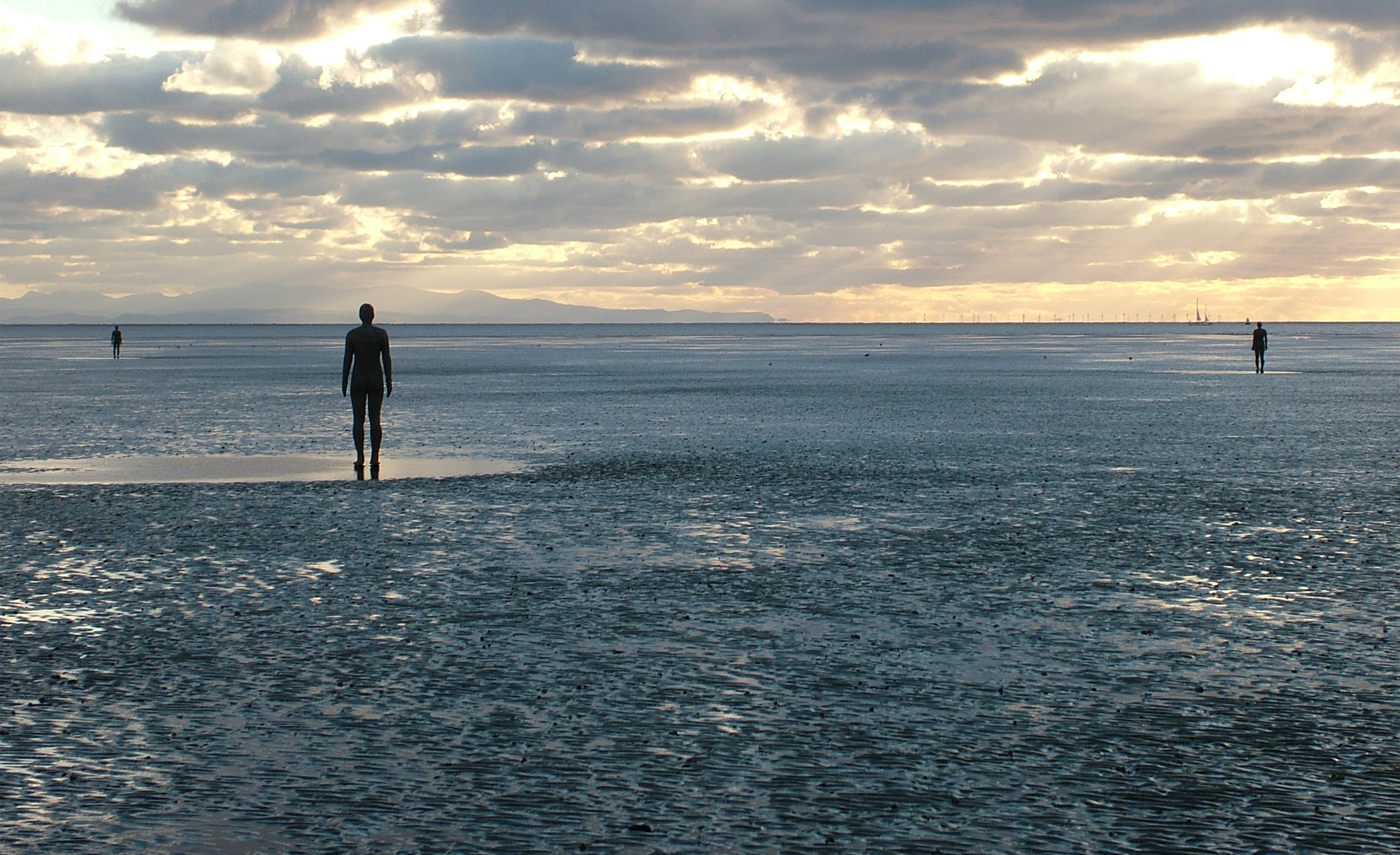
A portion of the installation showing the relation amongst three of the figures

Another Place is a piece of modern sculpture by British artist Antony Gormley located at Crosby Beach in Merseyside, England. It consists of 100 cast iron figures facing towards the sea. The figures are modelled on the artist's own naked body. The work proved controversial due to the naked statues but has increased tourism to the beach. After being exhibited at two other locations, it was put on display at Crosby on 1 July 2005. After some controversy, Sefton Metropolitan Borough Council decided on 7 March 2007 that the sculptures should be permanently installed at the beach.

== Construction and history ==
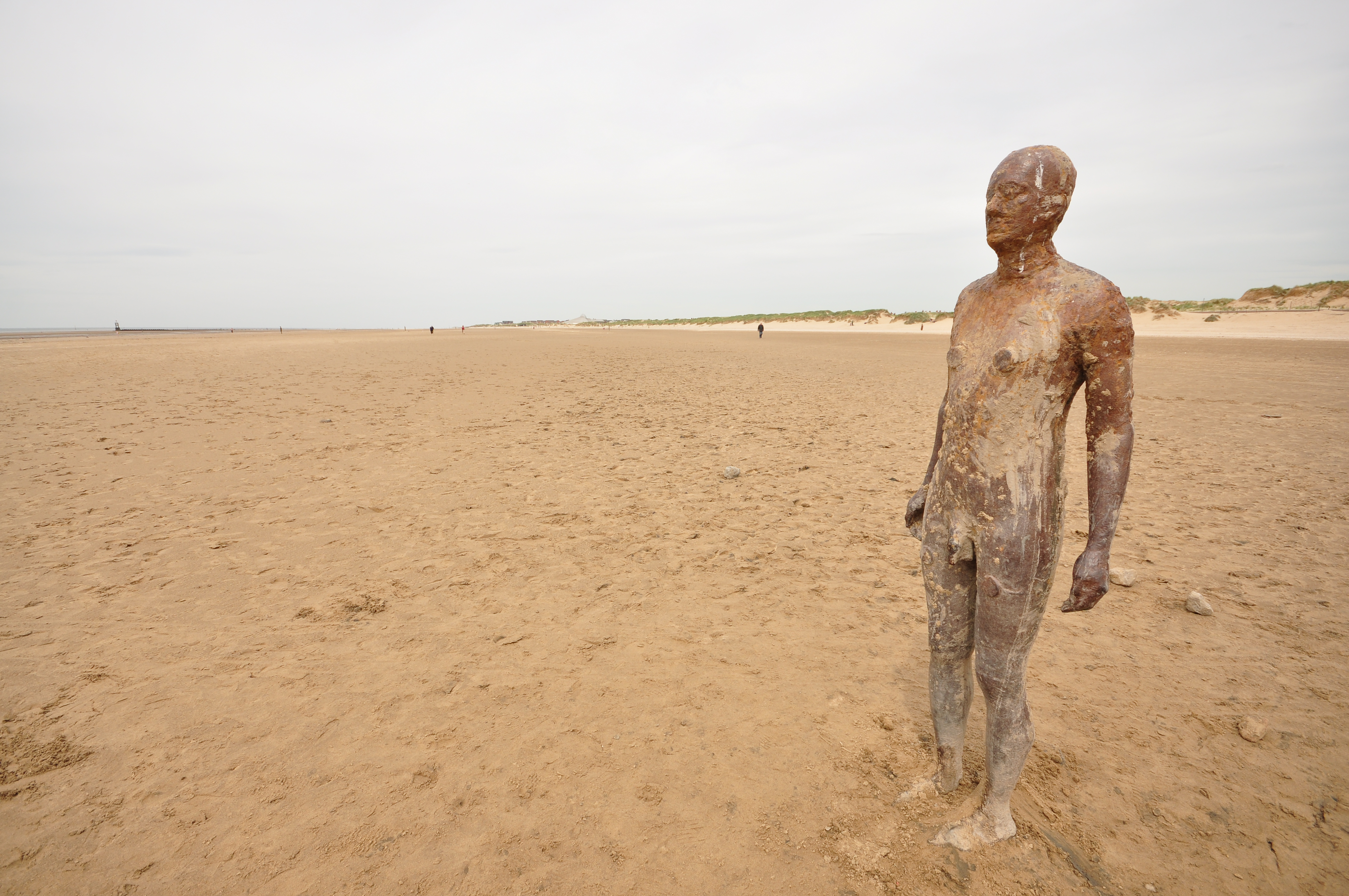
A view of one of the figures

The work consists of cast iron figures which face out to sea, spread over a 2-mile (3.2 km) stretch of beach between Waterloo and Blundellsands. Each figure is 189 centimetres (6 ft 2 in) tall and weighs around 650 kilograms (1,430 lb). The figures are cast replicas of Gormley's own body. As the tides ebb and flow, the figures are revealed and submerged by the sea, and are subject to corrosion by seawater and colonisation by marine animals. The figures were cast at Hargreaves Foundry in Halifax, West Yorkshire and the Joseph and Jesse Siddons Foundry in West Bromwich by foundryman Derek Alexander.

== Public reception ==
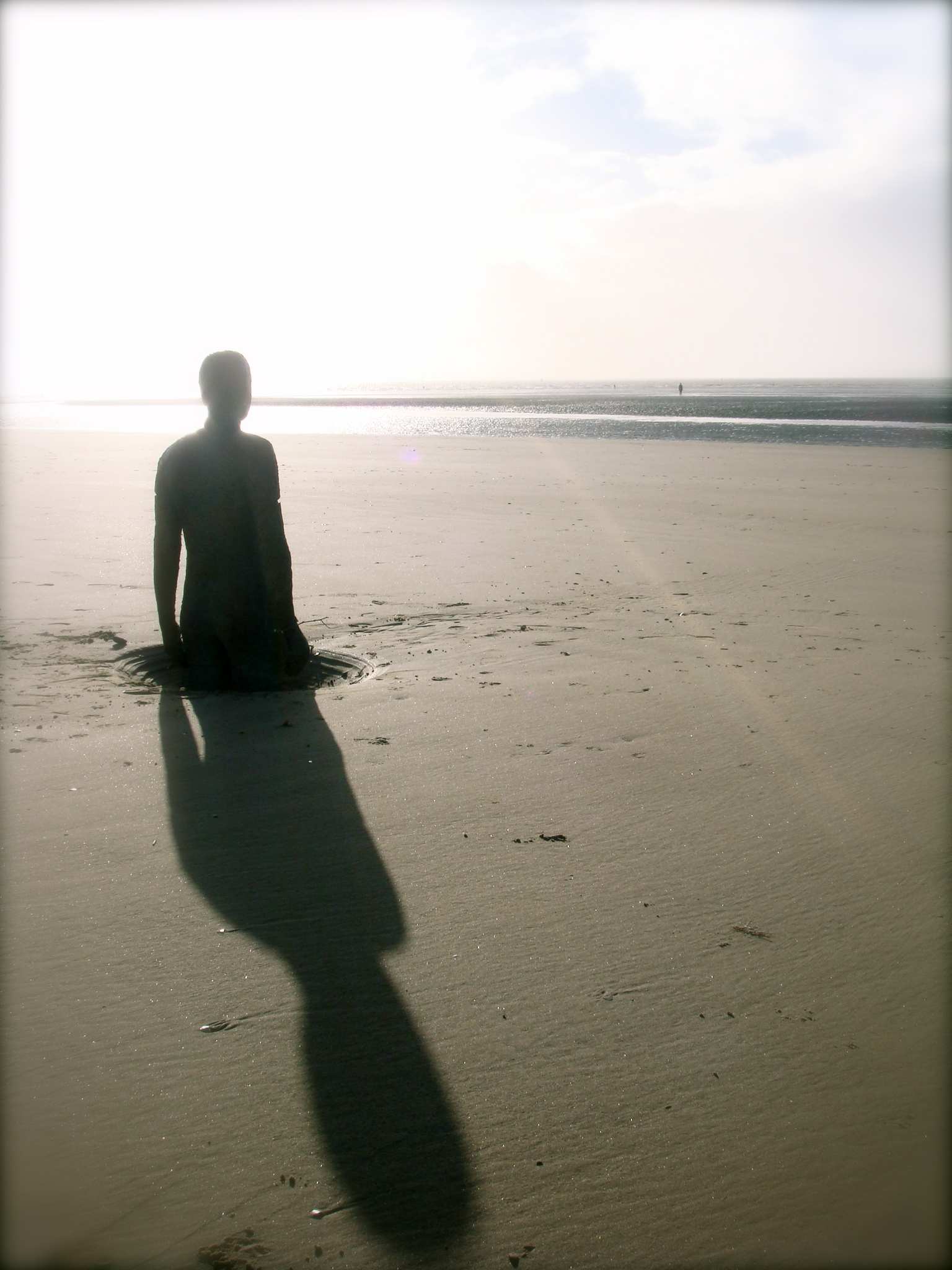
Another Place at sunset

Another Place was first exhibited on the beach of Cuxhaven, Germany, in 1997 followed by Stavanger in Norway and De Panne in Belgium. It was the subject of much controversy in Merseyside, although many people considered the figures to be beautiful pieces of art, and tourism in the local area increased.

Originally, the statues were due to be relocated in November 2007. Those who use the beach for watersports were among the most vocal in their resistance to the figures remaining, citing safety concerns. The coastguard also expressed safety concerns, fearing that tourists could become stuck in soft sand and get cut off by the tide. Conservationists, meanwhile, complained that bird-feeding areas had been compromised by the increased tourist traffic. Art lovers and local businesses, on the other hand, lobbied for the statues to stay. Gormley himself supported the proposal to keep the statues at Crosby Beach, saying the location was "ideal".

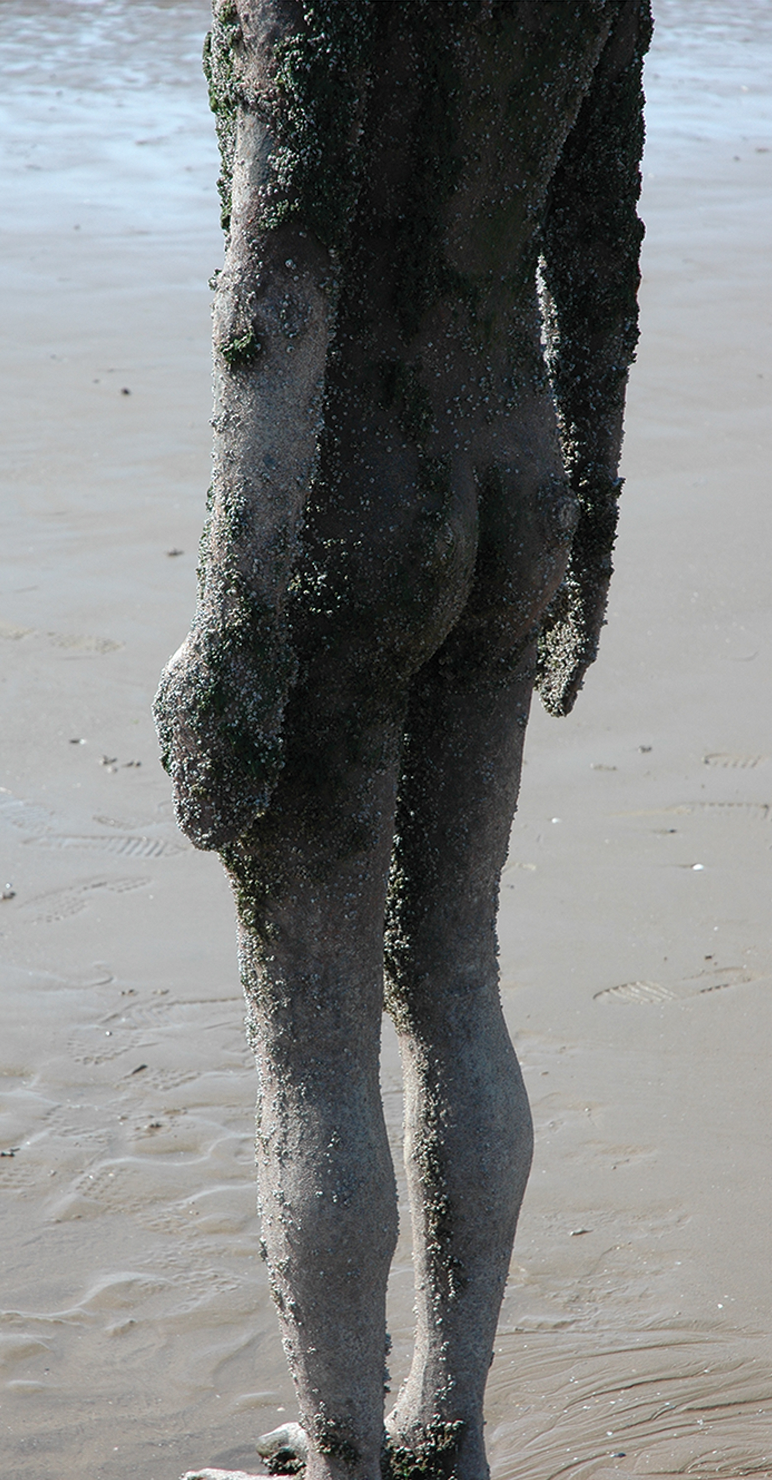
Barnacles growing on one of the figures

In October 2006, the local council refused to give permission for the statues to stay. The company Another Place Ltd was established to campaign for the figures' permanent installation and appealed the council's decision.

In March 2007, permission was granted for Another Place to remain at Crosby Beach permanently. The approved plan provided for 16 statues to be moved from contentious areas and decreased the installation's area from 232 to 195 hectares. The cost of the work was estimated at £194,000, to be paid by Another Place Ltd with funding from sources including The Northern Way and Northwest Development Agency.

In a press release, the Chief Executive of Sefton Metropolitan Borough Council, Graham Haywood, said, "Despite some controversy, this internationally renowned artwork has aroused national and international public and media support ... The Iron Men have placed Crosby and Sefton firmly in the spotlight and the knock-on benefits of this should be felt for years to come."

In 2012, biologists from the University of Liverpool studied the colonisation of the statues by sessile intertidal organisms, such as invasive species of barnacles.

== See also ==
- Event Horizon - also by Gormley, an installation of 31 statues on buildings around London
- Horizon Field - another work by Gormley, consisting of 100 statues placed across 150 square kilometres (58 square miles) in the Austrian Alps
