= Belvedere (fort) =

Fortification in Florence, Italy

Coordinates: 43.763447°N 11.253519°E

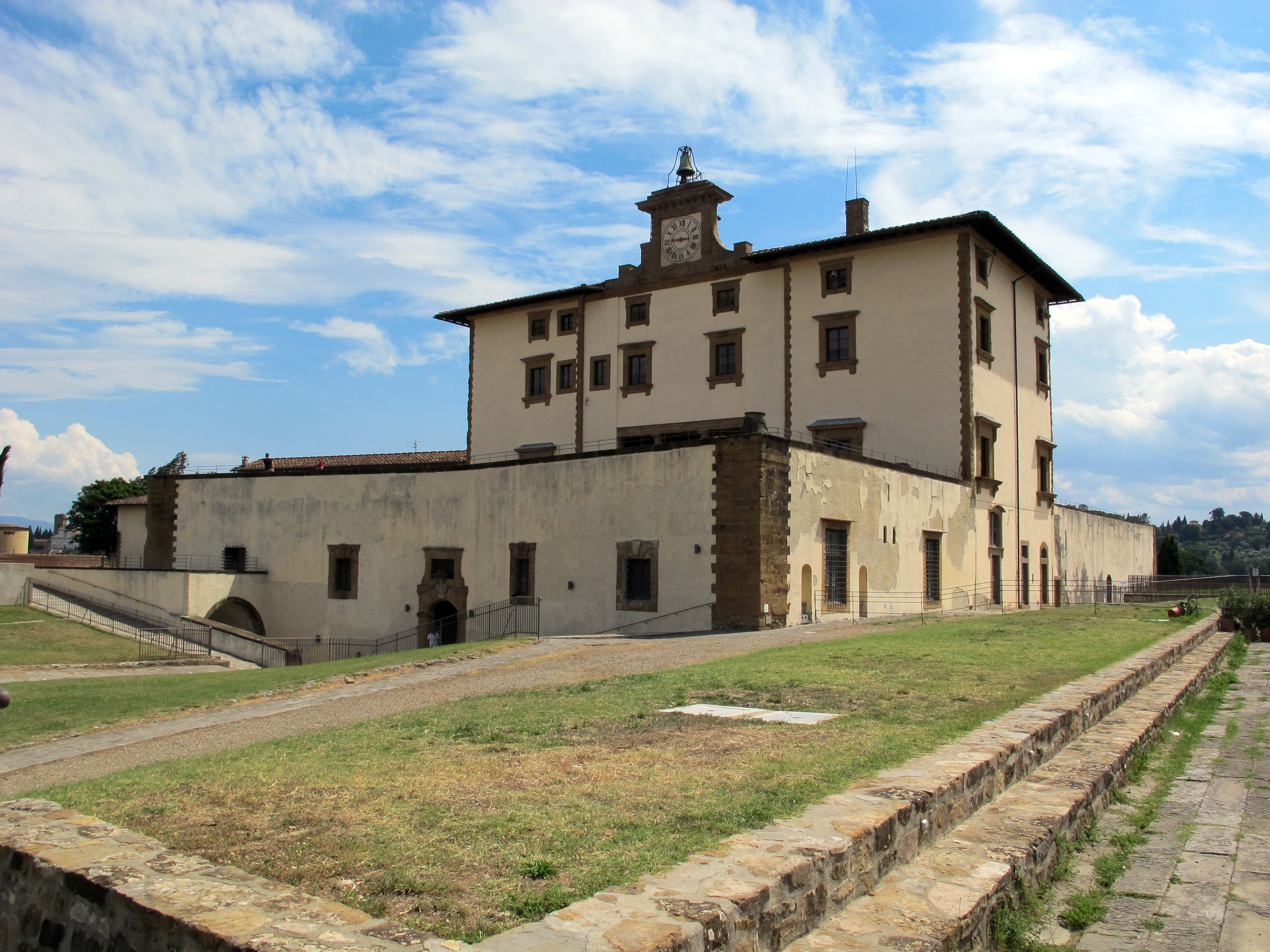
Fort Belvedere

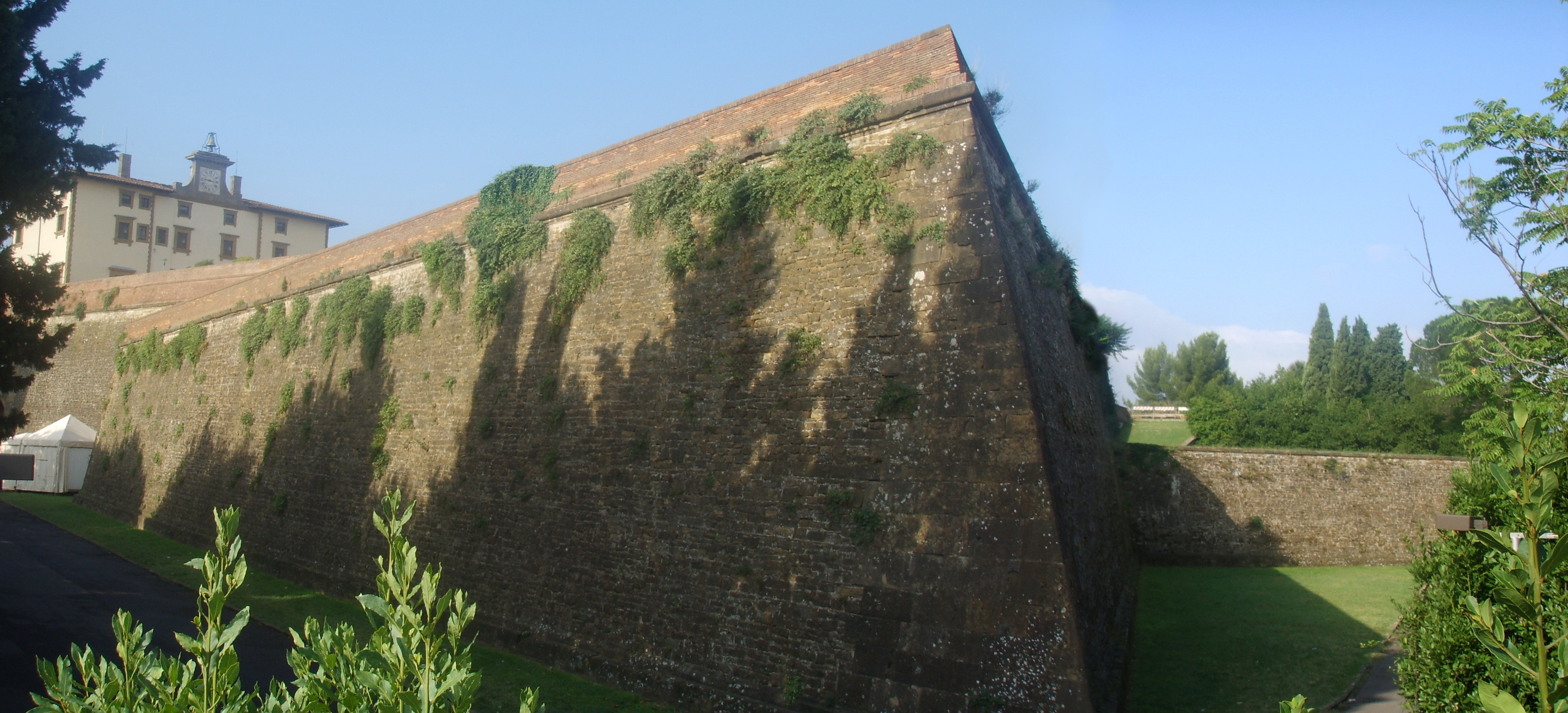
Fortification

The Forte di Belvedere or Fortezza di Santa Maria in San Giorgio del Belvedere (often called simply Belvedere) is a fortification in Florence, Italy.

== History ==
Forte Belvedere is the second and largest fortress to be built in Florence, Italy.

It was designed and built by Bernardo Buontalenti over a five-year period, between 1590 and 1595, by order of Grand Duke Ferdinando I de' Medici.

Fortifications were significant in the 16th century and a demonstration of a city's wealth and capabilities.

The fortress is located in the southern hills of the Arno River and on the highest hill of the Boboli Gardens. It had long been considered one of the weakest spots in the city's defenses, a sensation that only increased with the invention of artillery in the early modern era. From a military point of view, the fortress is located at the most strategic point, overlooking almost the entire city and surrounding area. Due to the nature of Renaissance warfare, forts were paramount in a city's defensive strategy.

The Fort served several purposes. Most importantly it was designed to protect the centre of government in Florence and the Medici family if the city came under attack. It was also constructed to protect the Pitti Palace, Oltrarno district and south end of the city. In addition to this, the fort served as a garrison for troops for over 100 years after its completion.

Galileo Galilei used Forte Belvedere for his astronomical observations and after he was sentenced to life imprisonment in 1633, he lived not far from the fort in Villa Arcetri.

== Architecture ==
The design of the fort reflects both Italian Renaissance and military architecture.

Buontalenti's application of contemporary fortification principles is evident throughout the design. The walls are built at angles that allow for all the walls to be seen by another wall, allowing for cross fire to assist in protecting the other walls.

The fort was connected to the Palazzo Vecchio via the Vasari Corridor. There were also passages connecting it to the Pitti Palace and paths leading through the Boboli Gardens.

Frescos seen in the Palazzo Vecchio show an earlier version of the fort, built of earth and stone gabions.

The design of the fort demonstrated the power and prestige of the Medici Family.

The opulent villa at the centre of the fortress, Palazzina di Belvedere, predates the fort and was designed by Bartolomeo Ammannati around 1570. As the fort's secondary purpose was to house the Grand Duke in times of unrest or epidemic, it was built as a comfortable, luxurious palace. It did not adhere to military purposes, housing the Medici family's treasures in the bottom of a well inside the building.

== Contemporary use ==
Today the Forte di Belvedere constitutes a monumental, historic, artistic and environmental focal point, offering visitors sweeping views of Florence and an insight to Renaissance architecture and military activity.

After five years of renovation to improve its safety features, the fort reopened to visitors in July 2013.

It serves primarily as a tourist attraction and exhibition centre, hosting elite events and artistic exhibitions year round.

On May 24, 2014, celebrity couple Kim Kardashian and Kanye West paid €300,000 to hire the fort as the venue for their lavish wedding.
