= Maytree =

Maytree may refer to:

- May pole
- Crataegus commonly called hawthorn, or hawberry
- Maytree (organisation) respite centre, located in the London Borough of Islington, England,
- Maytree (band), Korean band
- Maytree Travel

== See also ==
- Prunus padus, the "Mayday tree"
