= Lifecasting =

Process of creating a three-dimensional copy of a living human body

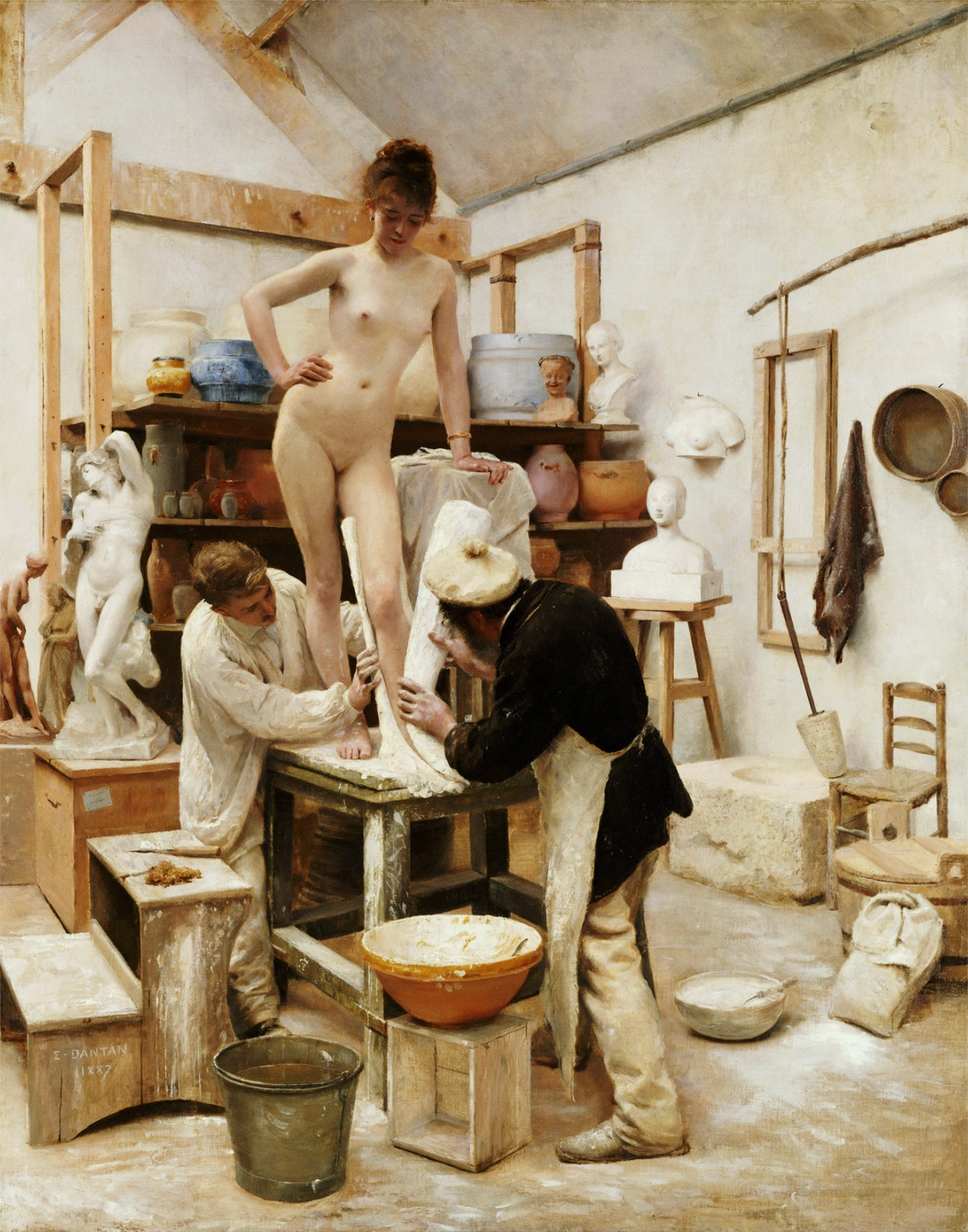
A Casting from Life, an 1887 painting by Édouard Joseph Dantan.

Lifecasting is the process of creating a three-dimensional copy of a living human body, through the use of molding and casting techniques. In rare cases lifecasting is also practiced on living animals. The most common lifecasts are 3D hand casting, casting of torsos, pregnant bellies, faces, and genitalia. It is possible for an experienced lifecasting practitioner to copy any part of the body. Lifecasting is usually limited to a section of the body at a time, but full-body lifecasts are achievable too. Compared with other three-dimensional representations of humans, the standout feature of lifecasts is their high level of realism and detail. Lifecasts can replicate details as small as fingerprints and pores.

== History ==
Casting from the human body has related antecedents outside modern lifecasting. Death masks—impressions of a face taken soon after death, usually by building up plaster or wax to form a mold from which a cast could be made—are attested in Europe from the late Middle Ages and, by the eighteenth and nineteenth centuries, were made for a wider range of political and intellectual figures.

In a related archaeological practice of casting from the dead rather than lifecasting proper, from 1863 Giuseppe Fiorelli poured plaster into the voids left in the volcanic ash at Pompeii by the decomposed bodies of victims of the eruption of AD 79.

In the nineteenth century, sculptors and their workshop assistants made plaster life casts of living sitters, often as studies for sculpture in marble, bronze or other materials. Souvenir casts of celebrities' hands and similar body parts also circulated as mementos rather than as finished works of art.

When Auguste Rodin exhibited The Age of Bronze at the Paris Salon in 1877, critics accused him of having used a life cast of his model, the Belgian soldier Auguste Neyt. Rodin commissioned the photographer Gaudenzio Marconi to photograph both the plaster version of the sculpture and Neyt so that the images could be used to rebut the charge.

== Process ==
There are a variety of lifecasting techniques which differ to some degree; the following steps illustrate a general and simplified outline of the process:

1. Model preparation. An oily substance such as petroleum jelly or a specialty release cream is applied to the skin and hair of the model to help prevent the mold from adhering to or mechanically locking onto hair. If the lifecast is to include the face or head, a bald cap or rubber swimming cap may be worn to protect the head hair.
2. Model pose. The model takes the desired stationary pose and must remain still until the mold material has set; seating and other supports may be used to help the model hold the pose comfortably.
3. Mold application. Mold material is applied to the surface of the model's body, typically as a thick liquid that takes the shape of the body. Body parts may also be immersed in containers of mold media such as alginate; safety guidance warns against casting body parts in a mass of wet plaster.
4. Mold curing and reinforcement. The applied mold material cures to a gelled or more rigid state. A rigid support shell, commonly made of medical-grade plaster bandages, is often added to support a thin, flexible mold.
5. Demold. Once the reinforced mold has attained the necessary strength, it is carefully removed from the model's body.
6. Mold reassembly and modification. If the mold was created in multiple parts, the parts may be rejoined before casting. The mold may be repaired or altered—for example by sealing nostril openings so casting material does not leak—and further reinforcements may be added.
7. Casting. A casting material is poured or brushed into the mold, usually in liquid form.
8. Demold cast. Once the casting material has taken the shape of the mold and cured, the cast is carefully removed. Alginate molds are typically temporary and suitable for only one or two castings, whereas silicone rubber molds can last for many castings.

== Molding and casting materials ==
A variety of materials can be used for both the molding and casting stages of the lifecasting process. For molding, alginate is widely used for temporary, single-use body molds, and medical-grade plaster bandages are commonly used to form a rigid support shell over the flexible mold. Different alginate formulations and water temperatures yield different working and setting times. Skin-safe silicone rubbers formulated for lifecasting are used when a reusable mold is required. Materials commonly cast into alginate or silicone body molds include plaster and gypsum cements, wax, clay, and fast-curing resins; silicone molds can also accept materials such as concrete and low-temperature metal alloys.

== Risks and challenges ==
Compared with the molding of inanimate objects, lifecasting poses specific challenges and risks. Because the mold is made directly on the skin, manufacturers recommend skin-safe, non-toxic molding materials and often a small-scale skin patch test for allergic sensitivity. Plaster can generate heat as it cures; applying bulk plaster or unsuitable plaster bandages directly to skin can cause discomfort or severe burns, so safety guidance emphasizes medical-grade bandages and proper technique. The molding process must usually be completed within a relatively short time while the subject holds a stationary pose. When a mold covers the mouth and nostrils, airways must be kept clear and breathing monitored; safety guidance advises against placing straws or other objects in the nostrils. To prevent injury or trapping the model in the mold, the shape and undercuts of the mold must be planned so that it can be removed at any stage.

Even experienced lifecasters can have trouble with mold materials snagging or mechanically locking onto small body hairs if release agent is inadequate, which can be uncomfortable. Some models can have allergic reactions to molding materials, and enclosure in a face or head mold can cause anxiety or claustrophobia; guidance stresses ongoing communication with the model and stopping if the subject is distressed.

== Lifecasting and art ==
Lifecasting is considered a sculptural art by some, while others regard it as a technical skill associated with artisans. Critics have argued that it lacks the talent or creativity required by more conventional sculptural disciplines, an objection that echoes late nineteenth- and early twentieth-century debates about photography. As with photographs, lifecasts are sometimes manipulated, altered and incorporated with other media. Lifecasters are united only by the fact that each work starts with a lifecast. Artistic choices begin with the choice of model, pose and area of the body shown; defining the edge is a sculptural act.

Probably the most popular alteration is to add paint and various finishes to the surface of the lifecast.

From the early 1960s, George Segal wrapped living models in plaster-soaked medical bandages; after the shells hardened and were removed, the hollow forms became his life-sized sculptural figures.

Duane Hanson cast figures from live models in polyester resin and fibreglass, then painted them and dressed them with real clothes and accessories.

Antony Gormley has made sculptures from casts of his own body by being wrapped in plaster-soaked scrim, including the cast-iron figures of Another Place. His 2007 installation Event Horizon likewise used life-size figures cast from his body.

Kiki Smith has made papier-mâché body forms cast from life, as in Hard Soft Bodies (1992).

Participants making a dry cast with plastic wrap and packing tape at a workshop by Mark Jenkins in Baku, 2013.

Mark Jenkins pioneered "dry casting" in the early 2000s, a method that uses plastic wrap and clear packing tape to make molds of objects and human forms. Sharing the method has been part of his practice.

== Applications ==
Lifecasting is used to create detailed portraits and body reproductions for artistic, commemorative, and museum display purposes.

Lifecasting is regularly practiced in the special effects industry, where it is used in the creation of prosthetics, props, and related effects for film and television. Related techniques and materials are also used in medicine for orthotic and orthopedic appliances and medical training aids, and alginate is used in prosthetic socket fitting and as a dental impression material in the making of dentures.

Commercial kits have been sold for making personalized silicone replicas of erect penises by alginate molding and silicone casting.

Pregnant people often choose to have a belly cast of their torso made in late pregnancy, commonly between about the 32nd and 38th week, as a keepsake of the pregnancy shape.

A death mask is a similar process to lifecasting, with the major difference being that a death mask is created on a dead person's face.
