= Suicide in the United Kingdom =

Suicide rate per 100,000 population in the United Kingdom from 1990 to 2019

In 2024, there were 7,147 deaths in the UK officially registered as suicide, equating to an average of 20 suicides a day. 6,190 of these registered suicides were in England and Wales, marking the highest suicide rate in England and Wales since 1999. In Scotland there were 704 probable suicides in 2024. In Northern Ireland there were 290 suicide deaths registered in 2024. Suicide is the biggest killer of men under the age of 50 in the UK.

Governmental and other organisations have created different initiatives to attempt to prevent suicides in the country, including the establishment of a new post, Parliamentary Under Secretary of State (Mental Health, Inequalities and Suicide Prevention).

== Definition ==
The Office for National Statistics defines suicide as deaths from intentional self-harm (where a coroner has given a suicide conclusion or made it clear in the narrative conclusion that the deceased intended to end their own life) and events of undetermined intent (mainly deaths where a coroner has given an open conclusion) in people aged 15 and over, and also (since 2016) deaths from intentional self-harm in children aged 10 to 14. This definition will include more deaths than the definition used in other countries.

== Dynamics ==
Researchers and sociologists have identified several causes for the high rate of suicide in the United Kingdom; these include recent recessions, unemployment, austerity measures and loneliness. Research undertaken by Samaritans agree that socio-economic status tends to be the main cause, as it is for other groups. Relationship breakdown is another factor as they are often relying on a female partner for emotional support and are more likely to have access to their children restricted. However, less attention has been paid to situational factors - the fact that opportunity is a decisive factor in many suicides. Major reductions in UK suicide resulted from the introduction of North Sea gas, replacing much more toxic coal gas, and by limiting the supply of over-the-counter painkillers like paracetamol and co-proxamol.

Approximately 1 to 2% of the UK population is autistic, yet a study conducted of suicides in England from 1 January 2014 to 31 December 2017 and published in The British Journal of Psychiatry in 2022, found that 10% of those who died by suicide had elevated autistic traits. Suicidal ideation and death by suicide is more common in autistic people than non-autistic people. In 2024 it was reported that in the UK one in three autistic people have experienced suicidal ideation and almost one in four have attempted suicide. Autistic people have also been found to be seven times more likely to die by suicide than non-autistic people, with suicide as one of the leading causes of death for autistic people.

In 2023/4, the percentage of people aged 16 to 74 reporting having suicidal thoughts in the past year was 6.7%.

== Common methods ==
The most common method used in England and Wales is hanging, accounting for 59.4% of male and 45% of female suicides. Other suicides reported often include self-poisoning. Suicide using firearms accounts for only a very small fraction, possibly due to tight gun control, meaning very few households in the UK possess them (4 percent). Hanging is the most common method used by women, closely followed by self poisoning.

Inhalation of domestic gas was the most common method of suicide during the mid-twentieth century. It was completely eliminated by the 1990s as a result of the replacement of coal gas containing toxic carbon monoxide by the non-poisonous natural gas. Later, suicide by inhalation of carbon monoxide from car exhausts became common, but has declined since the introduction of catalytic converters.

== Statistics ==
Age-standardised rates generally fell between 1981 and 2007. 2007 also marked a low point in female suicides in the UK. In 2017, the suicide rate was 10.1 deaths per 100,000 population (5,821 suicides), one of the lowest rates recorded by the Office for National Statistics (ONS) since it began its time series of suicides in 1981. In terms of the male suicide rate specifically, 2017 was statistically the lowest rate recorded by the ONS since 1981, at 15.5 deaths per 100,000 (4,382 suicides).

Suicide rates as a whole (i.e. not specific to sex or gender) in England and Wales have increased since 2017, to reach a peak of 11.4 deaths per 100,000 in 2024 (6,190 suicides), the highest suicide rate in England and Wales since 1999, though this was still substantially less than the rates seen in the 1980s and 1990s. The male suicide rate in England and Wales increased from 16.4 deaths per 100,000 in 2022, to 17.6 deaths per 100,000 in 2024. The female suicide rate in England and Wales also increased, in this instance from 5.4 deaths per 100,000 in 2022, to 5.7 deaths per 100,000 in 2024.

The highest rate of suicide was recorded as 21.4 deaths per 100,000 population in 1988. Male suicides have consistently accounted for approximately three-quarters of all suicides in the UK since the mid-1990s.

6,507 people were registered to have died by suicide in the UK in 2018, significantly more than in 2017. In January 2013, MPs expressed concern at a rise in the number of suicides over the preceding years.

The suicide rate of 11.2 deaths per 100,000 population recorded by the Office for National Statistics (ONS) in 2018 is an increase on the 10.1 per 100,000 population recorded in 2017, which was the lowest since the organisation began recording data on suicide in the United Kingdom in 1981. In 1981 the ONS recorded the UK suicide rate as 14.7 deaths per 100,000.

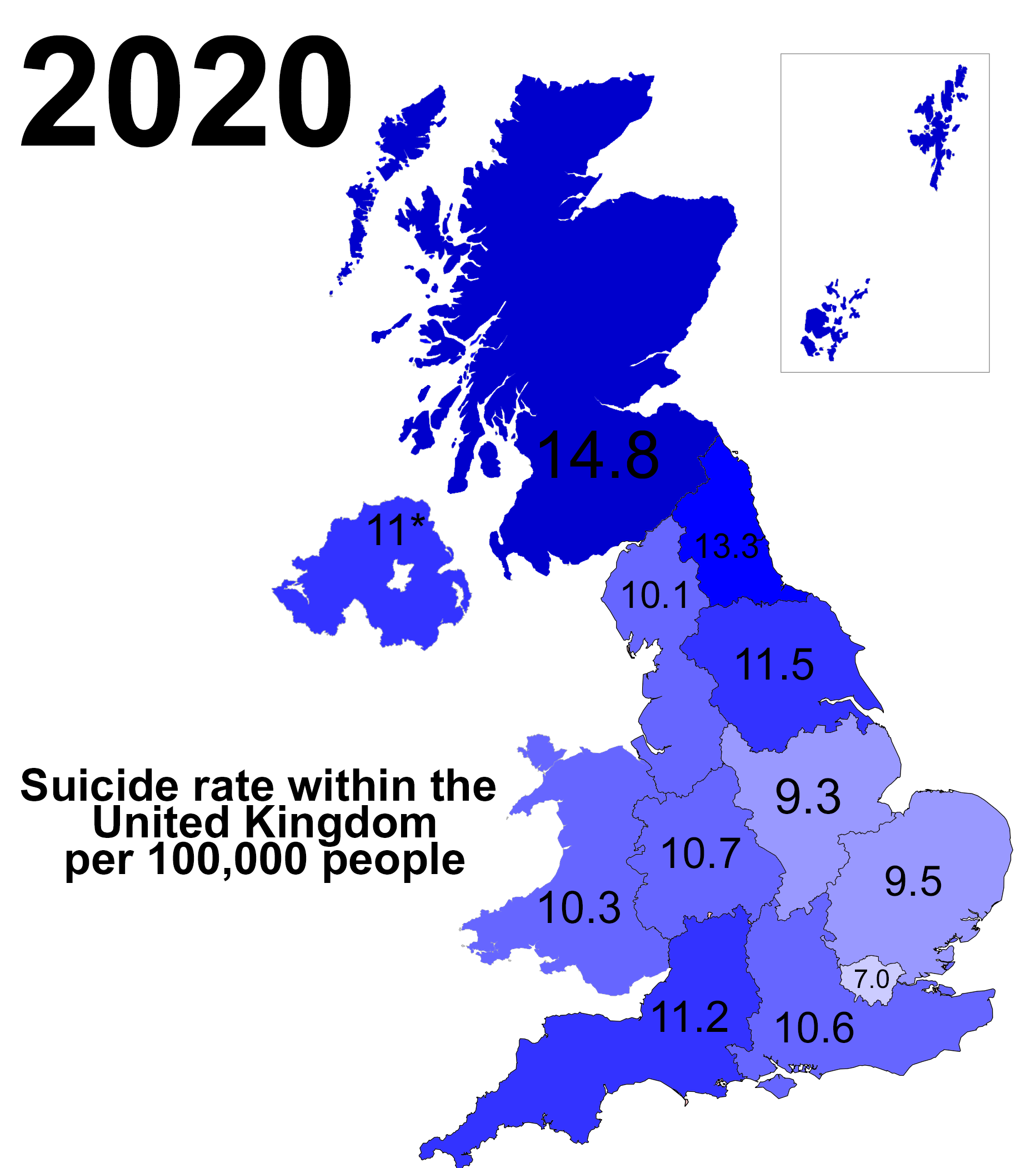
Suicide rates within the United Kingdom per 100,000 people in 2020

In 2019, the 15% increase in the suicide rate in Scotland was described as "devastating," with men most at risk.

74.1% of suicides in England and Wales in 2022 were males.

The suicide rate in 2024 was the highest since 1999, while also being the highest rate for males since 1999 and the highest rate for females since 1994.

There are regional disparities. Northern Ireland has consistently had the highest suicide rate of the UK's constituent countries. For instance, in the 2010s its age-standardised suicide rate (around 13 per 100,000 people) was markedly above the rates in England, Wales, or Scotland. In England, London had the lowest suicide rate in 2024, while North West England had the highest.

Data collected by the Northern Ireland Statistics and Research Agency (NISRA) for its 2024 suicide statistics report indicated that the suicide rate was highest for those with a marital status of single.

A survey of 3,695 adults aged 18 to 25 in 2023 found that 88% of trans and 83% of non-binary people had experienced suicidal thoughts or feelings, more than any other demographic covered in the survey. The survey also found that 74% of LGBT+ young adults surveyed had experienced suicidal thoughts or feelings, compared to 43% of non-LGBT+ young adults surveyed.

LGBTQ+ people suffer disproportionately higher mental health problems and risk of suicide than non-LGBTQ+ people in the UK. Reports have found greater degrees of self-harming, suicidal thoughts and suicide attempts among UK LGBTQ+ people than among heterosexual non-trans people in the UK.

A statistics report by Gov.uk regarding suspected suicides from August 2023 to October 2024 in England stated that suspected suicide was highest among those aged 45 to 64, followed by those aged 25 to 44 as the second highest group, and then people aged 65+ as the third highest group. The report said the age group with the lowest suspected suicide rate in England for that period was those aged 10 to 24 (the report only recorded those aged 10 and above). The report also indicated that suspected suicides in England during this time span were highest in January 2024.

Suicide rate
By sex; United Kingdom (1981–2018), rate per 100,000 people
Year	All	Male	Female
1981	14.7	19.5	10.6
1982	14.4	19.3	10.2
1983	14	19.1	9.6
1984	14	19.2	9.5
1985	14.7	20.1	9.8
1986	14.2	20.4	8.9
1987	13.4	19.6	8.2
1988	14.4	21.4	8.3
1989	12.7	19	7.2
1990	13.2	20.2	6.9
1991	12.8	19.7	6.6
1992	12.9	19.9	6.6
1993	12.5	19.2	6.4
1994	12.1	18.8	6.1
1995	12.1	18.9	6
1996	11.6	18.1	5.8
1997	11.4	17.6	5.8
1998	12.4	19.3	6
1999	12.2	19.3	5.8
2000	11.9	18.4	5.9
2001	11.5	17.9	5.5
2002	11.2	17.1	5.6
2003	10.9	16.9	5.5
2004	11.1	16.9	5.8
2005	10.7	16.4	5.5
2006	10.4	16.2	5
2007	10	15.6	4.7
2008	10.5	16.3	5
2009	10.3	16.1	4.9
2010	10.2	15.8	4.9
2011	10.9	16.8	5.3
2012	10.7	16.8	4.9
2013	11.1	17.8	4.8
2014	10.8	16.8	5.2
2015	10.9	16.6	5.4
2016	10.4	16	5
2017	10.1	15.5	4.9
2018	11.2	17.2	5.4
Source: Office for National Statistics, National Records of Scotland, Northern Ireland Statistics and Research Agency

Age standardised suicide rate
By gender and age group, United Kingdom (1981–2017), rate per 100,000 people (standardised to the European Standard Population)
	Males aged					Females aged				
Year	10–29	30–44	45–59	60–74	75+	10–29	30–44	45–59	60–74	75+
1981	9.8	19.5	23.1	22.0	28.6	3	8.5	15	16.2	13.6
1982	9.1	19.0	23.6	22.0	28.1	3.2	8.4	13.9	15.4	14.2
1983	9.0	19.7	22.5	22.5	28.6	2.9	8	12.8	14.8	13.4
1984	9.5	20.4	23.0	21.3	27.9	2.7	7.7	13.1	14.4	13.5
1985	10.8	21.6	23.2	22.6	29.1	2.7	7.5	13.7	15.9	13.5
1986	11.5	20.9	22.5	23.5	31.3	3.2	7	11.3	13.8	13.3
1987	12.3	21.0	21.1	21.5	27.7	3.6	7	10.5	11.8	10.8
1988	14.5	24.0	21.2	21.8	33.8	3.5	7.7	10.2	11.2	12.5
1989	13.8	21.4	21.1	16.9	26.8	3.7	6.4	9	9.3	10.6
1990	15.8	23.0	21.9	18.0	25.4	3.3	6.8	8.2	9.5	9.5
1991	15.1	25.0	21.5	15.6	24.0	3.4	6.4	8.4	8.1	9
1992	15.5	24.3	21.6	17.2	22.7	3.8	6.2	8.1	8.4	8.3
1993	15.9	23.3	21.4	15.2	21.2	3.6	6.6	7.5	7	9.5
1994	15.8	23.0	18.6	15.4	24.2	3.4	6.4	6.7	7.1	9.3
1995	15.3	24.8	19.5	14.2	21.2	3.3	6.5	7	6.3	8.3
1996	14.2	23.7	18.6	14.2	21.3	3.7	6.4	6.8	5.8	7.5
1997	15.1	22.1	18.6	13.0	20.0	3.5	6.5	7.2	6.3	6
1998	16.8	26.0	20.1	13.6	17.8	3.9	6.8	6.7	6.5	6.9
1999	14.9	25.7	19.9	15.1	20.6	3.6	6.7	6.4	6	7
2000	14.9	24.4	19.3	13.6	18.7	3.9	6.4	7.5	5.6	6.5
2001	13.0	23.4	20.4	13.5	18.1	3	6.7	6.7	5.7	6.2
2002	12.4	24.2	19.1	13.0	14.2	3.7	6.1	6.6	5.4	6.8
2003	11.3	23.8	18.2	13.1	16.8	3	6.5	7.1	4.9	6.4
2004	10.6	23.7	19.1	12.7	18.2	3.1	6.6	7.5	5.9	7
2005	9.8	23.0	18.9	13.1	16.3	3.1	6.2	7.7	4.9	5.5
2006	9.6	22.7	19.6	13.1	14.9	2.8	5.2	7.5	5	4.7
2007	9.8	22.3	18.3	12.0	15.4	2.2	5.4	6.8	5.1	4.4
2008	10.7	23.4	19.3	12.8	14.3	2.8	6.1	7.1	4.4	4.5
2009	10.5	22.4	20.6	11.6	13.9	3	5.9	6.5	4.6	4.8
2010	9.4	21.3	20.7	12.4	15.0	3	5.8	6.8	4.7	4.3
2011	10.4	23.5	22.1	12.7	13.8	3.3	6.4	7.3	4.6	4.8
2012	10.6	23.0	23.0	12.3	13.2	2.7	5.7	7.4	4.2	4.4
2013	9.8	23.4	25.1	14.5	15.4	2.3	6.3	7	3.9	4.7
2014	9.9	21.3	23.9	13.6	14.4	3.2	6.1	7.3	4.6	4.6
2015	10.6	21.0	22.3	13.8	14.8	3.2	6	7.6	5.4	4.8
2016	10.5	20.7	21.8	12.3	13.4	3.4	5.5	7.3	4.6	3.5
2017	9.9	19.7	21.8	12.0	12.1	3.2	5.8	6.3	4.6	4.5
Source: Office for National Statistics, National Records of Scotland, Northern Ireland Statistics and Research Agency

Suicide rate in England and Wales per 100,000 population

Suicides as a percentage of total deaths in the United Kingdom

Suicide rate per 100,000 people

Proportion of suicides by method in England and Wales

Suicide rate of males by age group in England and Wales

Suicide rate of females of different age groups in England and Wales

== Suicide prevention ==
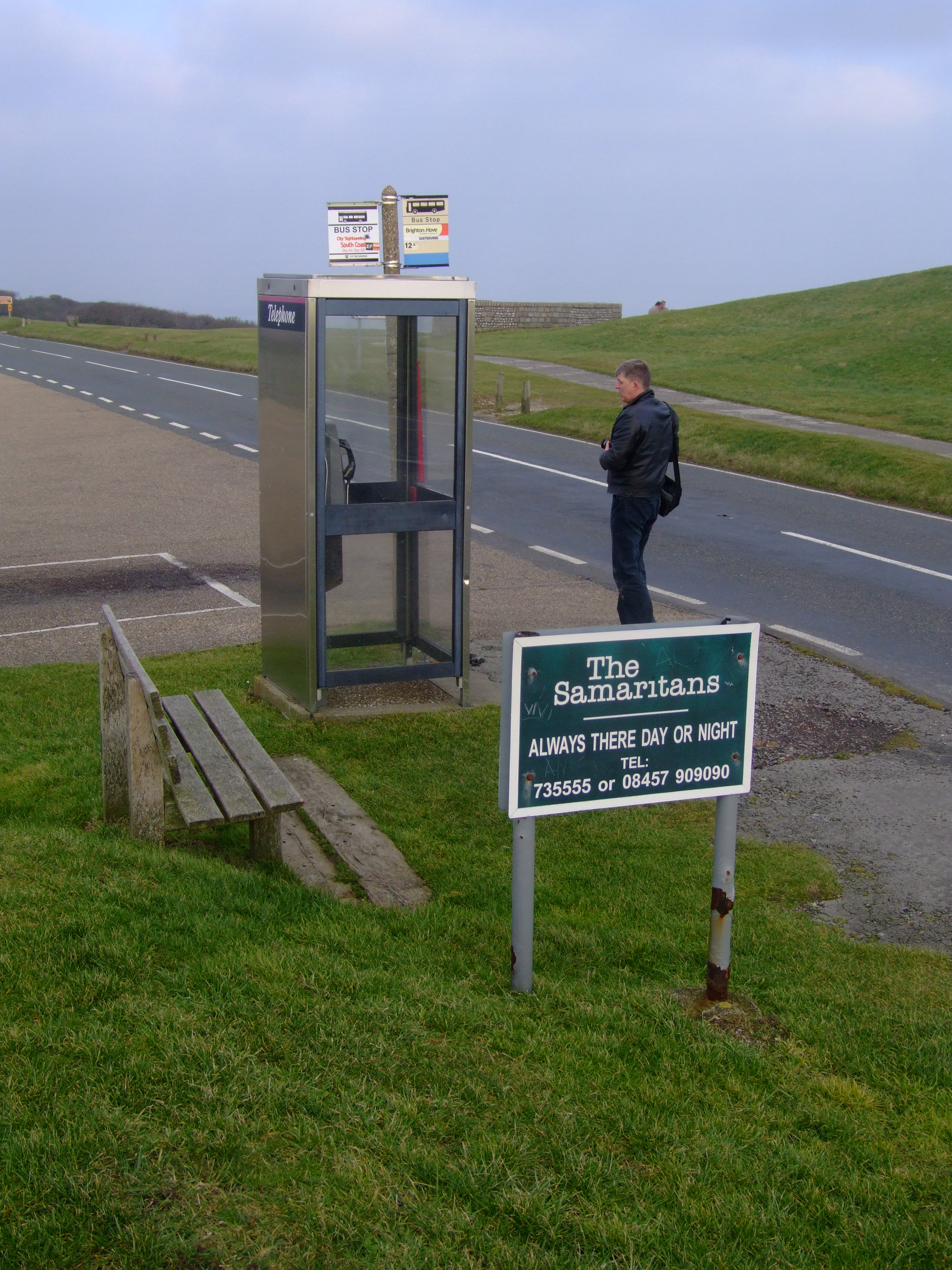
Sign promoting Samaritans near a payphone in the United Kingdom

Within the UK there are various organisations providing free mental health support.

The National Health Service (NHS) is the main provider of a range of mental health services, including 24/7 mental health crisis lines.

There are also prominent charities providing support via free helplines including Samaritans, the Campaign Against Living Miserably (CALM) and Inner Allies (previously named Mind Allies).

The government of the United Kingdom and a number of international and national organizations have undertaken a variety of efforts and initiatives to prevent suicides. There are different associations that provide help and suggestions to suicidal people. Some notable organisations include Grassroots Suicide Prevention (who developed the first UK suicide prevention app - Stay Alive), Papyrus (a suicide prevention group founded in 1997 by Jean Kerr – who lost her son to suicide), Maytree (a sanctuary for the suicidal), and U can cope.

In 2012, the United Kingdom government decided to spend £1.5 million to develop planning and strategies on preventing suicides. In January 2013, the social networking site Facebook started a partnership with suicide-prevention organisation "Save.org" to provide data that will be used to identify warning signs of people at risk of suicide. The service became live in the UK in 2016.

On 10 October 2018, the Prime Minister, Theresa May, announced the UK's first Minister for Suicide Prevention.

On 8 September 2026, the British suicide prevention charity Papyrus UK went into administration. The administrators said the charity would close with immediate effect. The closure meant the immediate ending of the charity's HopeLine24/7 phone-line, which was staffed by suicide prevention experts. The charity concluded that it couldn't continue operating "against a backdrop of rising demand, increased trading costs, and ongoing a reduction in reliable funding across the sector". Three fathers who lost their daughters to suicide called for the Prime Minister of the United Kingdom to save the charity.

== Terminology ==
There have been calls in the UK to change the language used around the topic of suicide, particularly the use of the phrase "commit suicide". The phrase is seen by some as suggesting suicide is a criminal act, thereby enforcing a notion of legal wrongdoing in the same way as "committing rape" or "committing murder".

The mainstream UK media currently observes the practice of avoiding the phrase "commit suicide" in line with the media reporting guidelines published by suicide prevention charity Samaritans, who refer to it as "inappropriate language".

On 10 September 2018 (World Suicide Prevention Day) more than 130 British celebrities and campaigners called for an end to the phrase "commit suicide", instead preferring the term "die by suicide". The letter was backed by Samaritans, mental health charity Mind, Members of Parliament from all political parties, London Mayor Sadiq Khan, June Sarpong, Stephen Fry, Zoe Ball and others.

== See also ==
- Campaign Against Living Miserably, UK charity
- Criminal Justice Act (Northern Ireland) 1966
- Project84
- Suicide Act 1961
- Suicide legislation

=== General ===
- Mental health in the United Kingdom
