= Plaster cast =

Copy of a solid form made in plaster

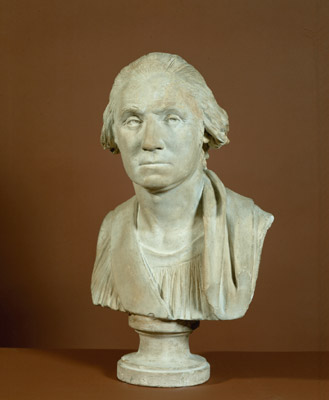
Plaster cast bust of George Washington by Jean-Antoine Houdon based on a life mask cast in 1786.

A plaster cast is a copy made in plaster of another 3-dimensional form. The original from which the cast is taken may be a sculpture, building, a face, a pregnant belly, a fossil or other remains such as fresh or fossilised footprints – particularly in palaeontology (a track of dinosaur footprints made in this way can be seen outside the Oxford University Museum of Natural History).

Sometimes a blank block of plaster itself was carved to produce mock-ups or first drafts of sculptures (usually relief sculptures) that would ultimately be sculpted in stone, by measuring exactly from the cast, for example by using a pointing machine. These are still described as plaster casts. Examples of these by John Flaxman may be found in the central rotunda of the library at University College London, and elsewhere in the university's collections. It may also describe a finished original sculpture made out of plaster, though these are rarer.

== Method ==
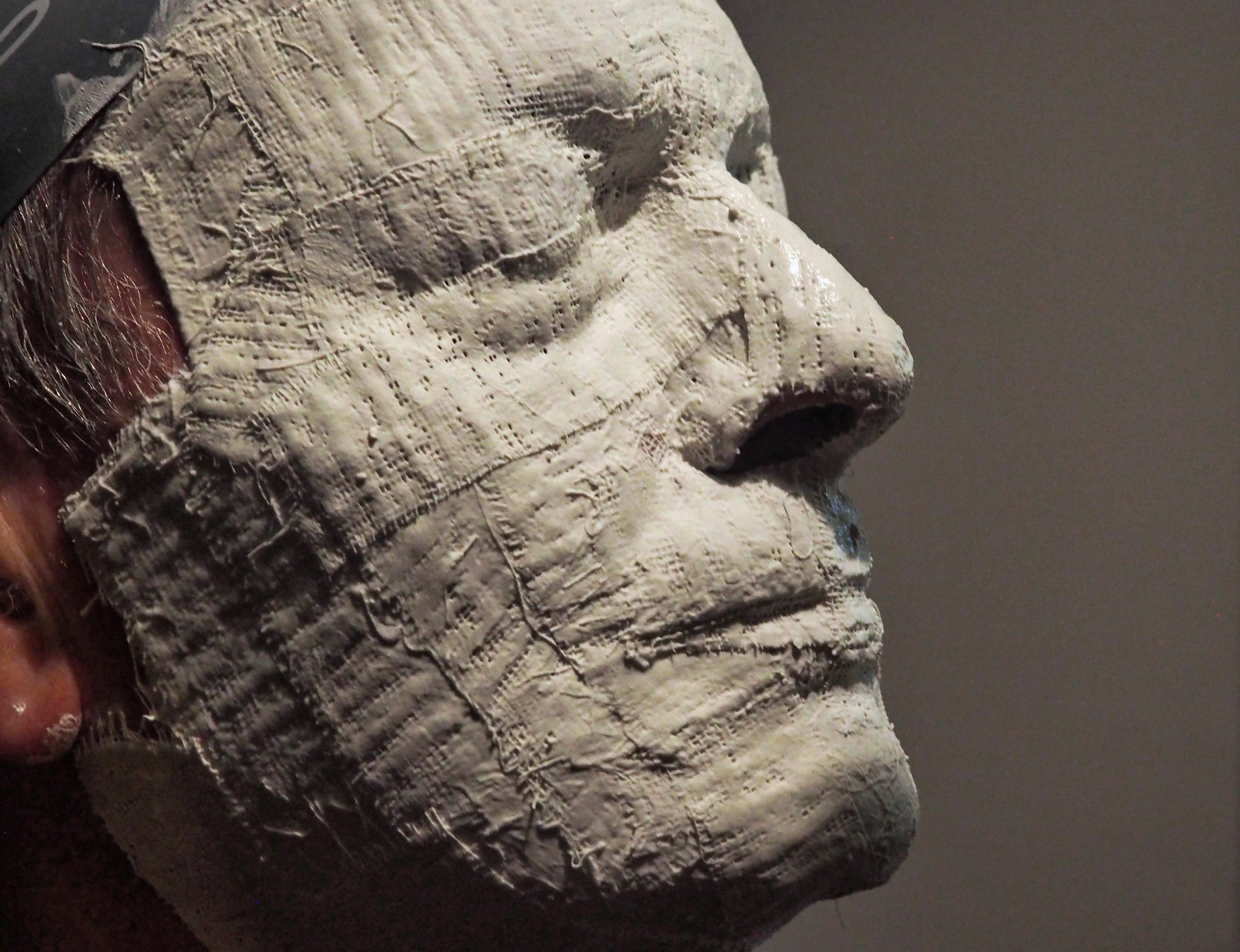
Face casting process, with plastered bandage

Plaster is applied to the original to create a mould or cast (that is, a negative impression) of the original. This mould is then removed and fresh plaster is poured into it, creating a copy in plaster of the original. Usually very elaborate moulds were made out of several to even dozens of pieces, to cast the more difficult undercut sculptures. Plaster is not flexible, therefore the moulds were made as 3D jigsaw puzzles for easy removal of the original and the cast from the mould. Later gelatine, rubber and silicone moulds were used, backed by plaster or polyester for support.

== History ==
=== Early ===
During the ancient era, plaster was used for transferring sculptural forms from one place to another, as well as a production aid for more durable sculptures or even a primary material.

The practice of reproducing ancient sculptures in plaster emerged around to the sixteenth century, when artists such as Leone Leoni assembled a collection of casts in Milan. He collected "as many of the most celebrated works… carved and cast, antique and modern as he was able to obtain anywhere". Such private collections, however, remained modest and uncommon until the 18th century.

=== Classical sculpture ===
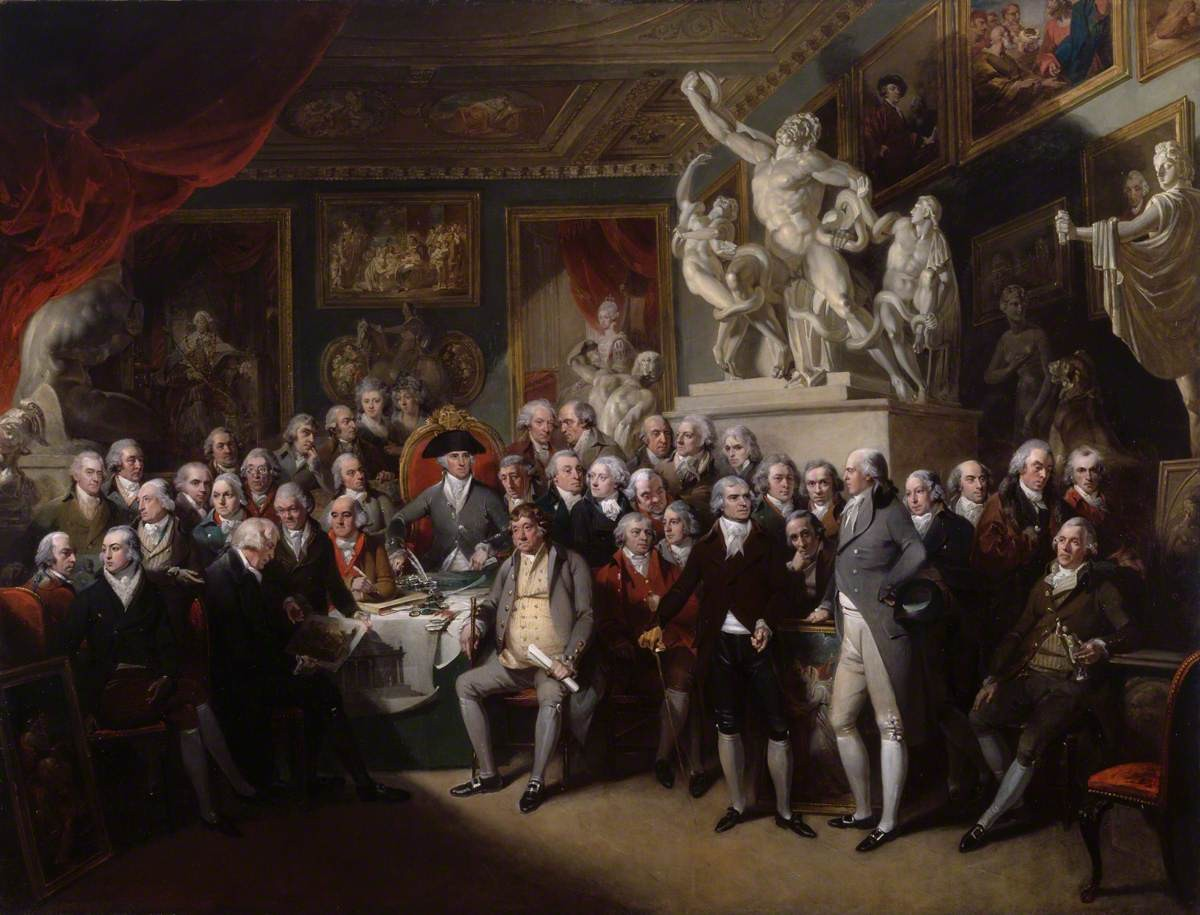
The Royal Academicians in General Assembly by Henry Singleton. A number of casts of classical statues are on displays behind the artists.

Use of such casts was particularly prevalent among classicists of the 18th and 19th centuries, and by 1800 there were extensive collections in Berlin, Paris, Vienna and elsewhere. A museum or gallery of plaster casts may be called by the French term gypsotheque. By creating copies of ancient Greek and Roman sculptures held at various museums across Europe in this way, a reference collection of all the best and most representative sculptural types could be formed, at a fraction of the cost of purchasing original sculptures, which scholars could consult without necessarily having to travel abroad to see all the originals. These casts could also be used in experiments in polychromy (reconstructing paint layers found on sculptures), reconstruction (e.g. Adolf Furtwängler's reconstruction of the Lemnian Athena from pieces found in different places), and for filling holes in a museum's collections of actual sculpture (e.g. the British Museum sent casts of some of its Mesopotamian collection to the Louvre in return for a cast of the Louvre's Code of Hammurabi).

=== Other ancient cultures ===
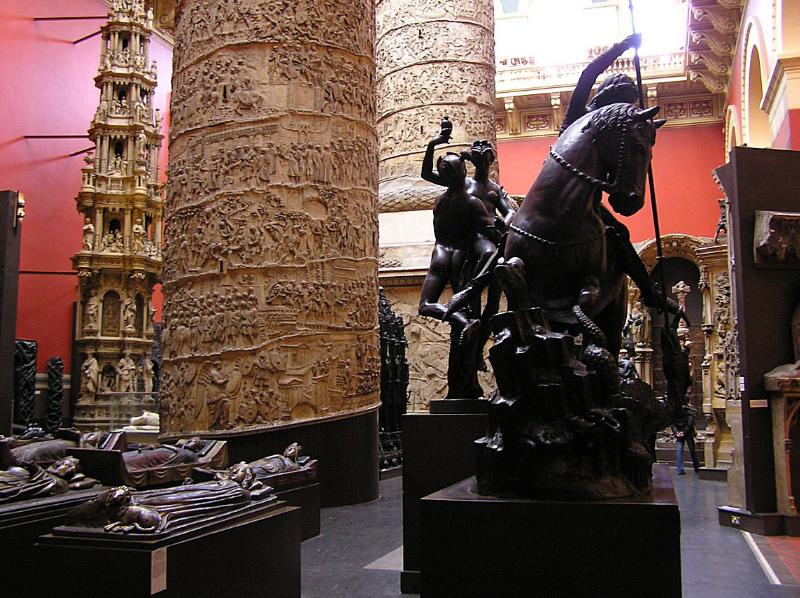
The West Court of the Cast Courts of the Victoria and Albert Museum

The technique was also applied later that century to reliefs from Ancient Egypt and friezes from Mesopotamia (examples of both of which may be seen on the North-East Staircase and in Room 52 of the British Museum), as well as to medieval and Renaissance sculptures (as may be seen in the Cast Courts at the Victoria and Albert Museum, which were a product of growing interest in medieval art at that time and the resulting desire to have a "reference collection" of such art). In the early 19th century, for example, perhaps as an expression of national pride, casts were made of outstanding national monuments particularly in France and Germany.

== Cast collections ==
With the advent of other methods of reproduction such as photography, as well as changing cultural trends, cast collections have entered a decline. The Metropolitan Museum of Art sold their collection in 2006, and many others have been relegated to storage.

As well as those locations mentioned above, classical cast collections may still be seen at the Museum of Classical Archaeology at the University of Cambridge, at the Ashmolean Museum in Oxford, in the Royal Cast Collection in Copenhagen, and the Bellarmine Museum of Art at Fairfield University. The British Museum also holds classical casts, but these are currently all in storage.

The French term for a collection or gallery of casts is a gypsotheque, as at the Louvre.

== See also ==
- Death mask – Wax or plaster cast made of a person's face following death
