= Life cast =

A life cast or life casting may refer to:

- Lifecasting, the process of creating a three-dimensional copy of a living human body through molding and casting techniques
- Lifestreaming#Lifecasting, a continual live streaming of events in a person's life through digital media
