= Torso =

Central part of the living body

Details

Identifiers
- Latin: truncus
- Greek: θύρσος (thúrsos)
- MeSH: D060726
- TA98: A01.1.00.013; A14.1.09.244; A14.2.03.003
- TA2: 124
- FMA: 7181

The torso or trunk is the central part, or the core, of the body of many animals (including human beings), from which the head, neck, limbs, tail and other appendages extend.

The tetrapod torso — including that of a human — can be divided into segments:

1. The chest or upper torso. This section is also called the thorax or the thoracic region. This is where the forelimbs extend.
2. The abdomen. The abdomenal section is also known as the "mid-section" or midriff.
3. The pelvis and perineum.

Sometimes the pelvic, perineal, and abdomenal regions are grouped together and called the lower torso.

The hindlimbs extend from the lower torso.

The back is also part of the torso.

== Anatomy ==
=== Major organs ===
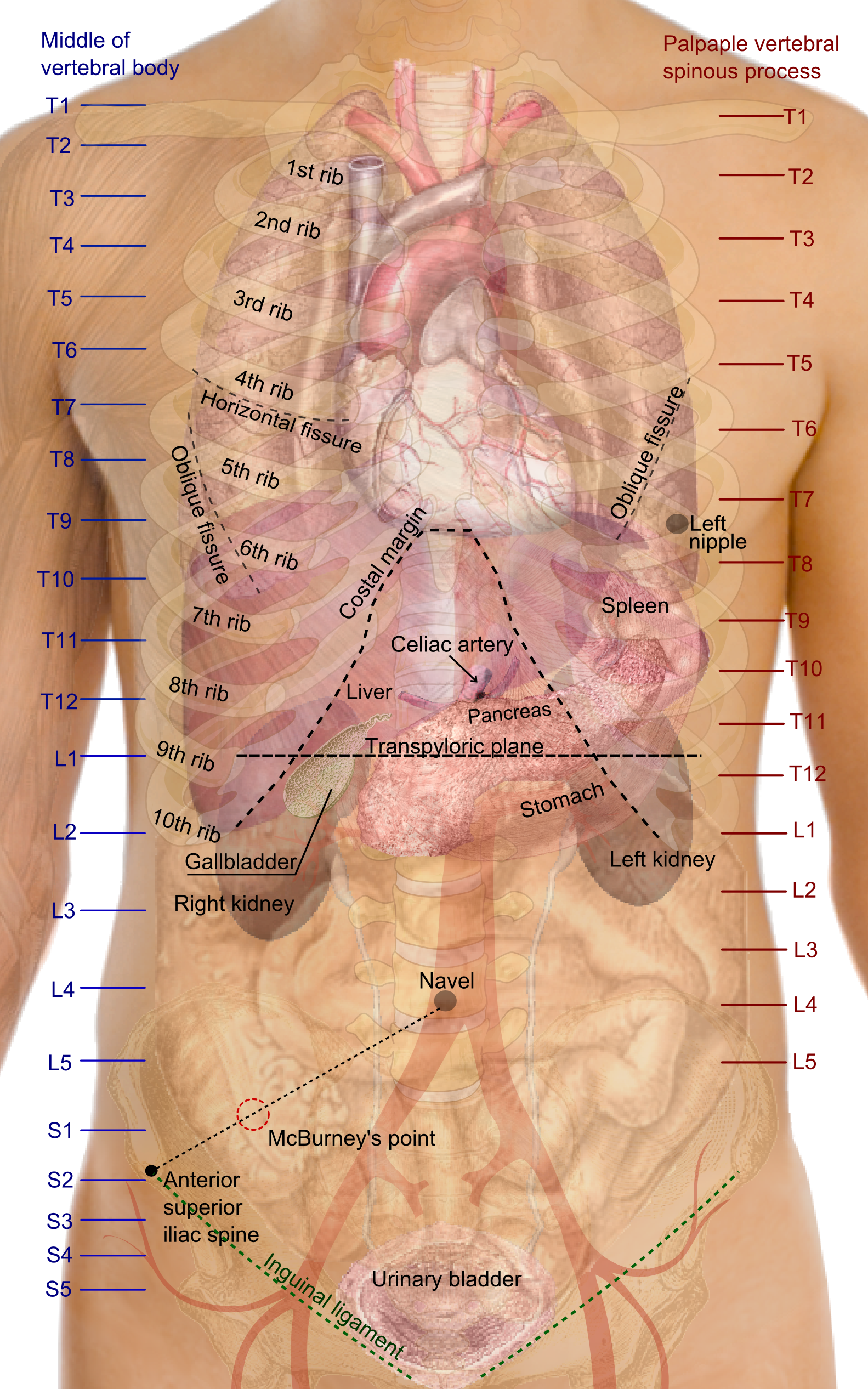
Surface projections of major organs of the torso, using the vertebral column and rib cage as main reference sources.

In humans, most critical organs, with the notable exception of the brain, are housed within the torso. In the upper chest, the heart and lungs are protected by the rib cage, and the abdomen contains most of the organs responsible for digestion: the stomach, which breaks down partially digested food via gastric acid; the liver, which respectively produces bile necessary for digestion; the large and small intestines, which extract nutrients from food; the anus, from which fecal wastes are egested; the rectum, which stores feces; the gallbladder, which stores and concentrates bile; the kidneys, which produce urine, the ureters, which pass it to the bladder for storage; and the urethra, which excretes urine and in a male passes sperm through the seminal vesicles. Finally, the pelvic region houses both the male and female reproductive organs.

=== Major muscle groups ===
The torso also harbours many of the main groups of muscles in the tetrapod body, including the pectoral, abdominal, lateral and epaxial muscles.

=== Nerve supply ===
The organs, muscles, and other contents of the torso are supplied by nerves, which mainly originate as nerve roots from the thoracic and lumbar parts of the spinal cord. Some organs also receive a nerve supply from the vagus nerve. The sensation to the skin is provided by the lateral and dorsal cutaneous branches.

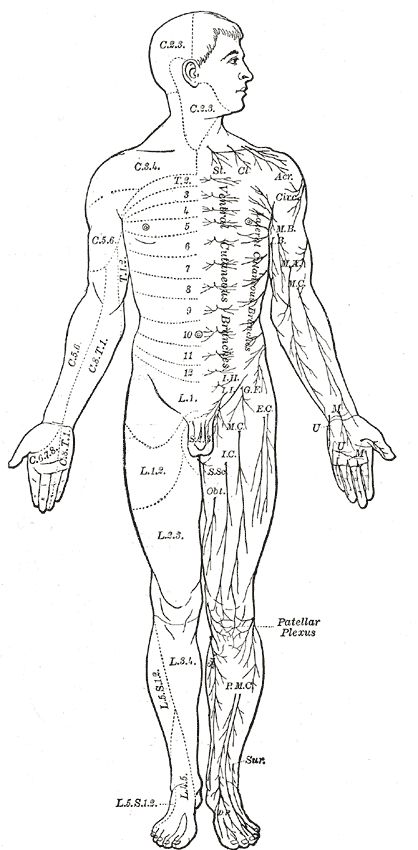
Distribution of cutaneous nerves. Ventral aspect. Dorsal and lateral cutaneous branches labeled at center right.

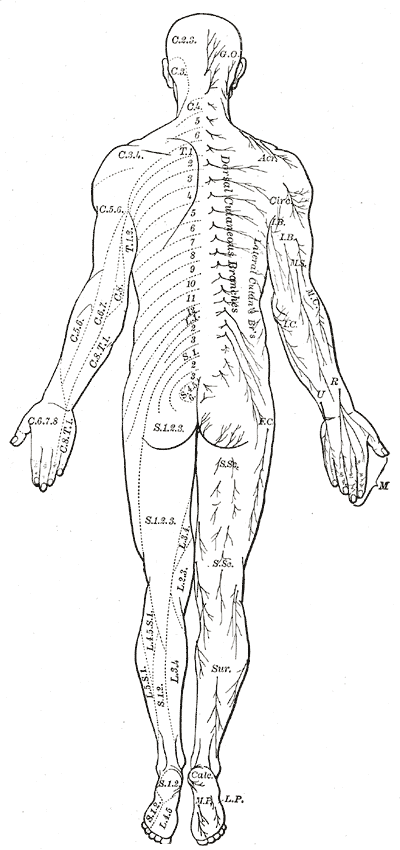
Dorsal aspect. Ventral and lateral cutaneous branches labeled at center right.

== See also ==
- Belly cast
- Waist
- Belvedere Torso
