= Mark Jenkins (artist) =

American artist (born 1970)

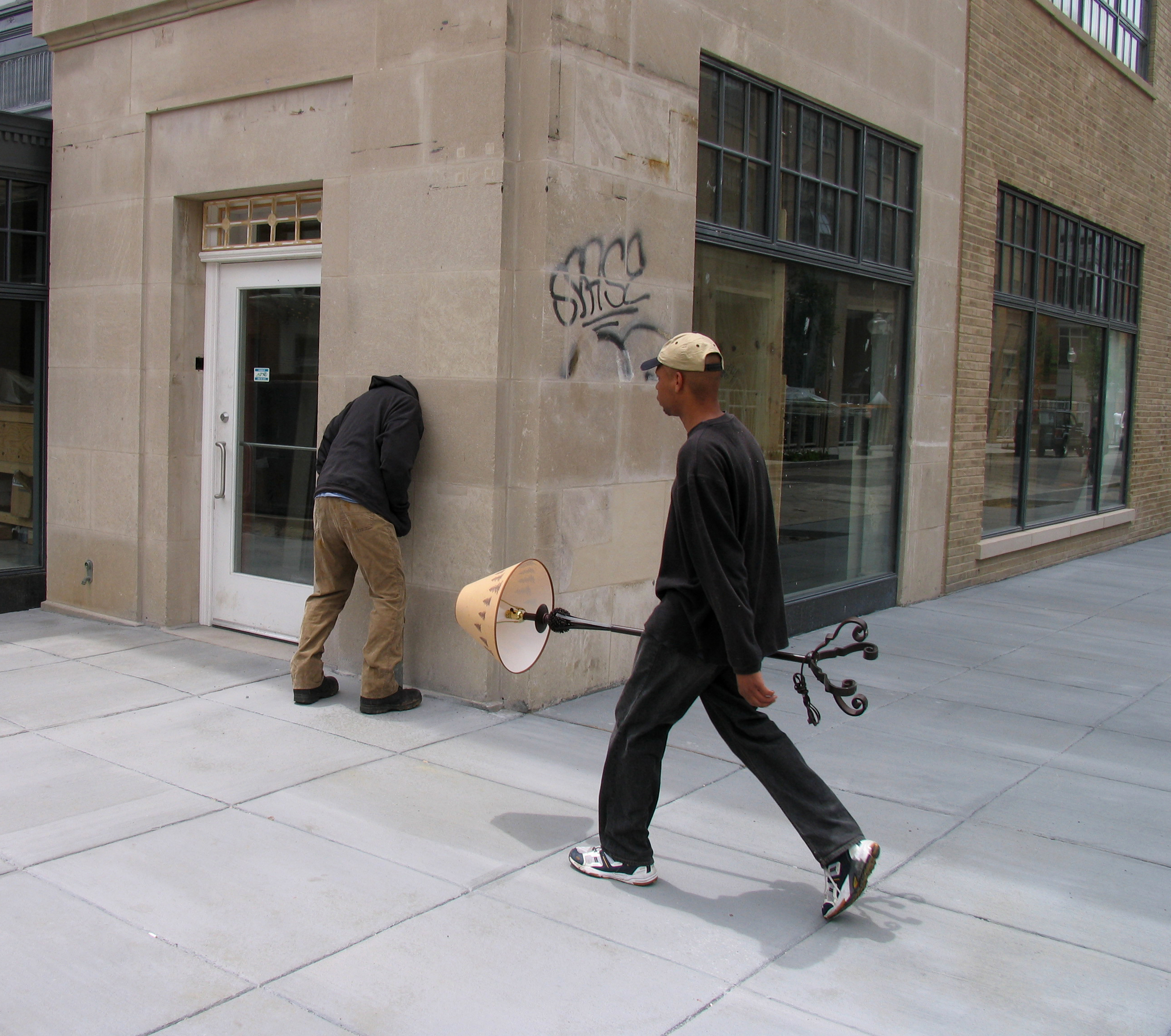
- Mark Jenkins' Embed sculpture.
- Born: October 7, 1970 (age 56); Alexandria, Virginia, U.S.
- Known for: Public art, installation art, street art, sculpture, tape art, hyperrealism, lifecasting, street installation
- Website: www.xmarkjenkinsx.com

Mark Jenkins (born October 7, 1970) is an American artist who emerged with the street art movement of the 2000s and whose work focuses on hyperrealistic casts that he places in the city, notably his Embed series of figures camouflaged into their surroundings. He views the city as a human body, seeing the police who often respond to his installations as its white blood cells. He alters civic structures, as in Signs of Spring, in which petals added to stop signs turn them into flowers. Marc Schiller of the Wooster Collective said his work "pulls you out of that zombielike experience that all of us have in the cities."

Jenkins pioneered packing-tape sculpture. His sculptural method uses packing tape to cast objects and people, a dry-casting process that he has popularized through workshops around the world. Indoors, Jenkins explores similar themes of hyperrealism, many of them integrating the canvas, such as his Kicked Paintings series of a foot kicking through still lifes and landscapes. He works together with Sandra Fernandez as Glazed Paradise. Jenkins cites Juan Muñoz as his initial inspiration. The critic Marguerite Pilven has placed Jenkins in a line with Duane Hanson and George Segal, noting that his figures' faces are often absent and that he sets aside their psychological approach in favor of the absurd.

== Early life ==
Jenkins grew up in Fairfax, Virginia, where music was his main focus; he played the saxophone from grade school through college and later in bands ranging from funk to rap-electronica. He graduated from Virginia Tech with a degree in geology.

His interest in installation sculpture came from seeing a Juan Muñoz exhibition at the Hirshhorn Museum in Washington, D.C. After traveling in South America, including hiking in the Andes, he settled in Rio de Janeiro to teach English, where he met the visual artists Adriana Branco and Alexandre Waldrich. His first installation there was a broken beach-umbrella frame arranged to look like a spider, at Arpoador. In 2003 he began experimenting with tape molding, a technique he had first tried as a child by casting a pencil in tape.

== Life and career ==
Storker Project

Wrapping an object in plastic wrap and covering it in tape, Jenkins was able to make casts of objects including himself. One of his first street projects was a series of clear tape self-casts that he installed on the streets of Rio de Janeiro. Jenkins became immediately interested in the reactions of the people and considered his installation as much a social experiment as an art project.

Tape Giraffe

In 2004 he returned to Fairfax, where he set up a studio in his parents' backyard to experiment with resin and fiberglass; it was about a year before he began installing work on the street again. In 2005 his work began appearing frequently on the Wooster Collective, Marc Schiller's online hub for street art. Schiller said his work "pulls you out of that zombielike experience that all of us have in the cities." That year he also began working with Sandra Fernandez on the Storker Project, a series in which clear casts of toy babies are installed in different cities to interact with their surrounding environment. Jenkins and Fernandez continued to create other installations using tape animals—dogs playing in litter, giraffes nibbling plastic bags from trees, and ducks swimming in gutters. Other outdoor projects that hack civic structures include Meterpops, Traffic-Go-Round, and Signs of Spring.

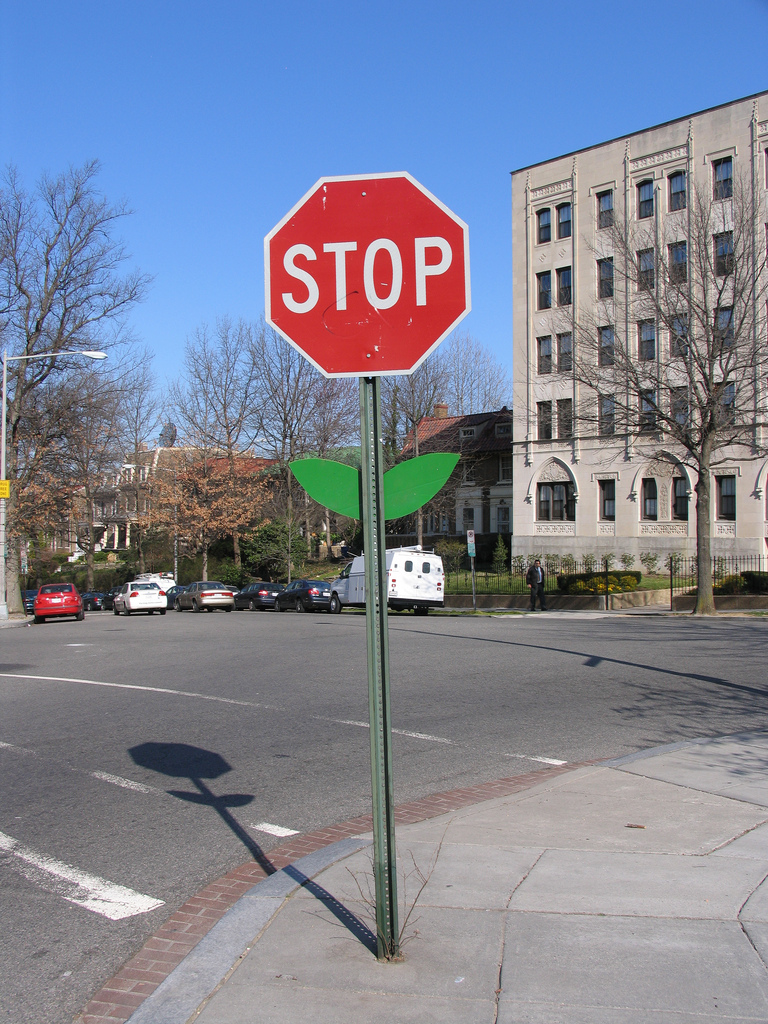
Signs of Spring

In 2006 Jenkins began the Embed Series. The tape casts were filled with newspaper and cement and dressed to create hyperrealistic sculptural duplicates of himself and Fernandez. These new lifelike sculpture installations created confusion causing some passers-by to make calls to 911 which caused police and sometimes rescue units to arrive on his "stage".

Also in 2006, Jenkins collaborated with the Graffiti Research Lab, a group based at the New York arts and technology center Eyebeam that developed new tools for graffiti and street art, on Jesus 2.0, which was shown at an evening of technology-based street art presented by Eyebeam and the Wooster Collective in May 2006. In 2007 he gave a tape sculpture workshop at Eyebeam during the Graffiti Research Lab's Open City exhibition. That year he also had his first solo exhibition in the UK, Outcasts, at Lazarides Gallery in London, and took part in the group show Santa's Ghetto in Bethlehem, where he placed a real donkey ridden by a figure in traditional Palestinian dress at the entrance.

The Golden Ass (2008), Barcelona

In 2008, in Barcelona, Jenkins installed The Golden Ass, a sculpture of a donkey disguised as a "living statue", among the living-statue street performers who collect coins from tourists; the sculpture collected coins from passersby.

Later in 2008, Jenkins collaborated with Greenpeace on an awareness campaign, Plight of the Polar Bears, to draw attention to the melting Arctic sea ice. Jenkins created realistic figures appearing to be homeless people but with plush polar bear heads. At the Columbia Heights Metro station, police treated one of the figures as a suspicious package; the bomb squad cut it open, and Metro closed the station and moved 218 people "out of the blast zone" by shuttle bus. Jenkins has described the police response to his installations as a kind of autoimmune disease.

In May 2009 Jenkins contributed sculptural figures to Tunnel 228, an installation and immersive theatre project presented by Punchdrunk and the Old Vic in disused tunnels beneath Waterloo station in London.

Kicked Paintings series.

In 2009 Jenkins began the Kicked Paintings, canvases pierced by a kicking figure. In March 2011 Carmichael Gallery presented his solo installation Family Room at the VOLTA NY art fair, converting its booth into a furnished family room.

Hoodie Bust sculpture by Jenkins

In 2010 Jenkins curated Les Grandes Traversées, a contemporary arts festival held between Bordeaux and Royan. The works he and his guests presented were all meant to interact with the public: in-situ installations that transformed the city, technological works revealing overlooked aspects of streets and buildings, and collective actions that reconfigured everyday urban space. Participants included Evan Roth, Improv Everywhere, Tim Conlon, Theo Watson and others, alongside workshops, films and talks.

In 2011 Jenkins collaborated with the dancers Jared Gradinger and Angela Schubot on Is Maybe, a performance at HAU Hebbel am Ufer in Berlin that explores the borders between bodies; he made transparent tape body casts of the two dancers wrapped chest to chest.

In September 2011 Jenkins installed The Death of Death in Dublin during Suicide Awareness Week, part of the public programme of Dublin Contemporary 2011.

From April 2015 to June 2016 Jenkins was artist in residence at Arsenal Contemporary Art in Montreal, where he developed a body of work reimagining art-historical images, among them Michelangelo's Pietà as a gored Goldilocks held by a repentant Papa Bear, and Lunch atop a Skyscraper as Terrorists atop a Skyscraper. The work was shown as Remix at Arsenal Montreal in 2016 and at Arsenal Toronto in 2017, where neighbors called the police about two figures on the gallery's roof.

In 2017 Jenkins began collaborating with Balenciaga under Demna at the Colette boutique in Paris, followed by installations at the brand's new Madison Avenue store in New York and its Avenue Montaigne flagship in Paris. In 2018 he created an installation at Selfridges in London.

Installation on a war-damaged building in Mostar, made for the Street Arts Festival Mostar

In 2018 Jenkins and his collaborator Sandra Fernandez, at the instigation of the charity 'CALM' (Campaign Against Living Miserably) created Project84 comprising life-size statues of 84 men on top of the ITV buildings at Southbank in London, England. It aimed to highlight the fact that, in the United Kingdom, an average 84 men die by suicide each week. Each of the statues represented a specific, named individual who died by suicide.

In July 2019, Jenkins installed a hooded fisherman beside the statue of Pierre Goudouli in Toulouse's Place Wilson, with a fishing line leading to a second figure submerged in the fountain, as part of the Rose Béton festival. The installation prompted a call to municipal police from a member of the public. Both sculptures were subsequently reported stolen.

In June 2022, for the festival Un Été au Havre in Le Havre, Jenkins installed six figures from the series Embed Bodies, including a skateboarder on the Volcan and a woman on a swing above the Bassin du Commerce. A figure hanging upside down from a building on Rue de Bretagne, in the Saint-François quarter, drew complaints; some residents called the police after mistaking it for a dead body, and the figure was taken down the day after it was installed.

In 2022, Jenkins was commissioned by Steve Lazarides to make a hyperrealistic sculpture of a woman passed out in a bowl of soup for his gallery, which subsequently resulted in police breaking down the gallery doors in a rescue attempt.

In 2022 Jenkins made six installations for the Street Arts Festival in Mostar, five of them placed at the former Razvitak building, on the Bulevar and in Titova and Zagrebačka streets. The festival said the pieces drew public attention to the city's unreconstructed ruins, and a 2024 study in Political Geography cited them as an example of art used to "denaturalise living with ruins".

In June 2024, the City of Longueuil removed Jenkins's sculpture of a figure on a swing suspended from a tree in St. Mark Park following complaints. The city said the work's lifelike appearance had caused confusion among residents.

In 2025 he made a sculpture of Demna for the exhibition Balenciaga by Demna in Paris.

In 2026 Jenkins presented The Casting Show at the AMUSEUM of Contemporary Art in Munich, his first solo museum exhibition in Europe. The show also includes his Kick-Paintings and new Hand-Signed Paintings, old oil paintings with arms or legs reaching out of the canvas. An Abendschau report described the museum rooms as staged like domestic interiors, with a figure lying in a bed and another reading a book while hanging from the ceiling.

== Philosophy ==
Jenkins frames his work through what he calls the "Human City", a reading of the city as a human body in which people are blood cells, streets are veins and arteries, and advertising is plaque on the vessel walls. Within that body his work acts as nutrition, medication or virus; his hyperrealistic figures are the virus, camouflaged as cells to provoke a reaction. In his words, "police or firefighters react to my sculptures like white blood cells react to foreign bodies or pathogens in the blood". In a 2009 lecture at Reynolda House presented by the Southeastern Center for Contemporary Art, Jenkins likened people in public space to blood cells and police to white blood cells that "protect the body from anything that they deem to be dangerous," comparing heavy charges against street art and graffiti to "some sort of immune system disorder where... the body attacks itself."

He has argued that because "the only visual content that's updated with any real frequency are commercial advertising spaces", the ephemeral nature of street art is essential, as it "creates a visual heartbeat in the city by people who are living in it, rather than just marketing to it." He sees sculpture as turning "regular space into art space", in which "signs and people and everything around a street sculpture—they all become part of it", whereas "a two-dimensional work, being confined to surfaces, doesn't have as much of a capacity."

== Characters ==
Several types of figure recur in Jenkins's sculpture, distinguished mainly by how the head is treated; his life-size figures have no faces.

Seated faceless hoodie sculpture (2006) by Jenkins

Mole Sitter (2008) by Jenkins

Some figures wear a hoodie with the drawstrings pulled tight; Jenkins called them "moles because they can't really see". Hooded figures appear in his first Embed installation, in Washington, D.C. in June 2006, which leaned face-first into a wall. The same year he set up a seated figure resembling a panhandler, in jeans and a hardened hoodie with no head inside. In 2008 The Japan Times described another street installation "disguised as a homeless man in a hood, but without a head".

Blonde (2007) by Jenkins

Other figures wear ski masks or balaclavas, sometimes holding a bat. Other figures are of women or girls, in some cases with hair covering the face. In 2010 Die Presse described his "astonishingly realistic-looking woman" vomiting in front of the entrance of the Kunsthalle Wien. In 2019 in Toulouse he installed a girl "with her face hidden by her hair" on a swing hanging from the Saint-Pierre bridge.

Trasher (2009) sculpture by artist Mark Jenkins

Another figure is a standing pair of legs, in trousers and sneakers, topped by a tied black garbage bag in place of a torso, arms, or head. Jenkins has described the idea as "this guy living inside of his own trash, unable to see". One such sculpture, Trasher (2009), was shown in Purple Splendor at Ve.Sch in Vienna and later at Kunsthalle Wien.

== Workshops ==
Jenkins has said he hoped to "push packing tape upwards to join the ranks of other popular sculpting mediums such as papier mache, bronze and Legos." He teaches his tape casting process in workshops and master classes, in which participants make their own sculptures and install them in public space; in his words, "teaching people this idea of using their body to make self-replicas to put out into public space." He also publishes a do-it-yourself guide to the method on his website tapesculpture.org. His method has been taken up by others, including art teachers who have used tape casting in their classes.

Participants making a dry cast with plastic wrap and packing tape at a workshop in Baku, 2013.

In 2009 he taught a workshop at the Center for Creative Communications in Shizuoka, Japan, during his solo exhibition there, and with the curator Arseny Sergeev of Artpolitika he led Unbodied, a series of master classes and street interventions in Yekaterinburg and Moscow, part of the parallel program of the 3rd Moscow Biennale. Participants in Yekaterinburg set a tape polar bear afloat on the city pond. The project continued in Perm in 2010 with the Perm Museum of Contemporary Art, curated by Sergeev and Nailya Allakhverdieva, and he returned to the museum in 2012 for Anonymous, a master class whose participants installed their figures on the streets of Perm. In 2011 he taught in Tashkent, Uzbekistan, and in 2013 Allakhverdieva curated his workshop and Manimals project for the Participate Baku public art festival at YARAT Contemporary Art Space in Baku.

== Selected exhibitions ==
=== Public art events ===
- 2007 – Polar Christ, STEP, Warsaw
- 2008 – Under the Rainbow, Malmö
- 2008 – Interferencia, Barcelona
- 2008 – VII Simposio Puerto del Rosario, Fuerteventura
- 2009 – Fame Festival, Studio Cromie, Grottaglie
- 2009 – BELEF, Belgrade, workshop and street installations supported by the US Embassy in Belgrade
- 2009 – Inside Out, Southeastern Center for Contemporary Art, Winston-Salem
- 2010 – 42° Latitud Arte, Tudela
- 2012 – Living Layers, Wunderkammern, Rome
- 2012 – Katowice Street Art Festival, Katowice
- 2012 – Walk & Talk, São Miguel, Azores
- 2012 – Bien Urbain, Besançon
- 2013 – CityLeaks Urban Art Festival, Cologne
- 2013 – Vilnius Street Art Festival, Vilnius
- 2013 – Tic Tac Toe, Positive-Propaganda, Munich
- 2014 – Les Vraisemblables, Nuit Blanche, Paris
- 2017 – Splash and Burn, Riau, Sumatra
- 2017 – Street installations, San Sebastián
- 2019 – Big Brother, Positive-Propaganda, Munich
- 2019 – Doomsday Clock, Positive-Propaganda, Munich
- 2021 – Passages Insolites, Ex Muro, Quebec City
- 2022 – Chrysalis, Manif d'art 10, Quebec City
- 2022 – Embed Bodies, Un Été au Havre, Le Havre
- 2022 – Street Arts Festival Mostar, Mostar
- 2023 – The Ledge, Rümelinsplatz, Basel
- 2026 – Glazed Paradise (nr 12), OpenArt, Örebro

=== Gallery exhibitions ===
- 2007 – Outcasts, Lazarides Gallery, London
- 2008 – Glazed Paradise, Diesel Gallery, Tokyo
- 2009 – The Golden Ass and Other Stories, Stricola Contemporary, New York
- 2010 – Meaning Is Overrated, Carmichael Gallery, Los Angeles
- 2011 – Family Room, VOLTA, New York
- 2012 – Glazed Paradise, Gestalten Space, Berlin
- 2012 – Holding Cell, Ruttkowski;68, Cologne
- 2013 – Unsupervised (with Tameka Norris), Lombard-Freid Gallery, New York
- 2013 – The Studio, Patricia Dorfmann Gallery, Paris
- 2014 – Terrible Horrible, Ruttkowski;68 Gallery, Cologne
- 2015 – Moment of Impact, Lazarides Gallery, London
- 2016 – Remix, L'Arsenal, Montreal
- 2016 – Knock Knock, Ruttkowski;68, Cologne
- 2017 – Rubber Time (with Andrew Schoultz), Castanier Gallery, Miami
- 2017 – Rules of Engagement (with Rero), Wunderkammern, Milan
- 2018 – BRD SHT, Magda Danysz Gallery, Paris
- 2019 – From Here to Nowhere, Castanier Gallery, Miami
- 2021 – The Games That We Play…, Ruttkowski;68, Düsseldorf
- 2022 – The Harder They Come, Castanier Gallery, Miami
- 2022 – Fight or Flight, Zone Contemporaine, Bern

=== Museum exhibitions ===
- 2008 – Fresh Air Smells Funny, Kunsthalle Dominikanerkirche, Osnabrück
- 2008 – Call It What You Like, Kunstcentret Silkeborg Bad, Silkeborg
- 2008 – Recordings, Taubman Museum of Art, Roanoke, VA
- 2009 – Urban-Art – Werke aus der Sammlung Reinking, Weserburg Museum für moderne Kunst, Bremen
- 2010 – Unbodied, Perm Museum of Contemporary Art (PERMM), Perm
- 2010 – Street and Studio, Kunsthalle Wien, Vienna
- 2011 – Street Art – meanwhile in deepest east anglia, thunderbirds were go…, Von der Heydt-Museum, Kunsthalle Barmen, Wuppertal
- 2013 – Ex Situ, Centre Pompidou, Paris
- 2026 – WE ARE [still] HERE, Petit Palais, Paris
- 2026 – The Casting Show, AMUSEUM of Contemporary Art, Munich

== Publications ==
=== Monographs ===
- The Urban Theater: Mark Jenkins (2012) ISBN 3899553969
- Mark Jenkins: la rue mise en scène (2013) ISBN 2917829834

=== Publications with contributions by Jenkins ===
- Hidden Track: How Visual Culture Is Going Places (2007) ISBN 3899550846
- Tactile: High Touch Visuals (2007) ISBN 3899552008
- Street World: Urban Art and Culture from Five Continents (2007) ISBN 0810994380
- Outsiders: Art by People (2008) ISBN 1846055466
- Street Art: The Graffiti Revolution (2008) ISBN 0810983206
- Untitled II. The Beautiful Renaissance: Street Art and Graffiti (2009) ISBN 0955912121
- Modart No. 01: Forget Art: In Order to Feel It (2010) ISBN 1584233745
- Urban Interventions: Personal Projects in Public Places (2010) ISBN 3899552911
- Beyond the Street: The 100 Leading Figures in Urban Art (2010) ISBN 3899552903
- The Art of Rebellion #3 (2010) ISBN 3939566292
- Street Art Cookbook: A Guide to Techniques and Materials (2011; new edition 2024) ISBN 918563946X, ISBN 9789188369888
- Art & Agenda: Political Art and Activism (2011) ISBN 389955342X
- Walls & Frames: Fine Art from the Streets (2011) ISBN 3899553764
- Trespass: A History Of Uncommissioned Urban Art (2011) ISBN 3836509644
- The World Atlas of Street Art and Graffiti (2013) ISBN 0300199422
- Street Craft: Yarnbombing, Guerrilla Gardening, Light Tagging, Lace Graffiti and More (2015) ISBN 0500517843
- The Art of Rebellion 4: Masterpieces of Urban Art (2016) ISBN 3939566497
