= Steve Lazarides =

British-Greek Cypriot art dealer

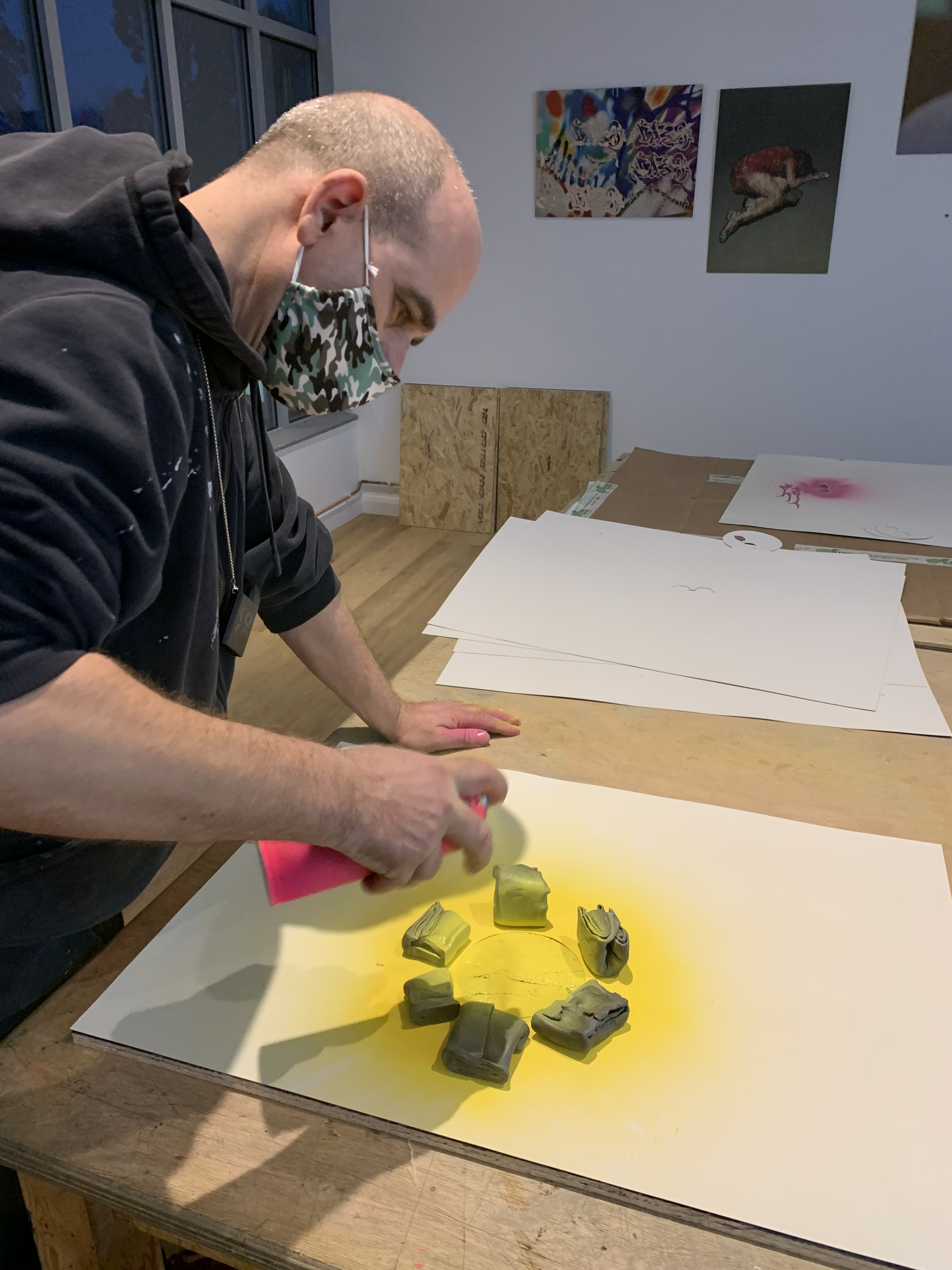
- Lazarides in his West Country studio
- Born: 1969 (age 56–57); Bristol, England
- Occupations: Gallerist, art promoter
- Known for: One time associate of Banksy and promoter of street art
- Website: lazemporium.com

Steve Lazarides (Greek: Στηβ Λαζαρίδης; born c. 1969) is a British-Greek Cypriot publisher, photographer, collector and curator. He has helped popularise street art and underground art. He worked with Banksy from 1997 until around 2008, first as his photographer and later as his agent and dealer.

== Early life ==
Steve Lazarides grew up in Bristol, England, and studied photography at Newcastle Polytechnic. He became interested in graffiti as a teenager in Bristol, where he followed the city's emerging graffiti scene.

== Art career ==
Lazarides worked as a photographer and photo editor for the magazine Sleazenation, and also photographed for The Face. In the early 1990s he documented British youth subcultures, including the UK rave scene, skate culture and the rise of outsider street art.

Sleazenation sent Lazarides to Bristol to photograph Banksy in 1997. He continued to work with the artist as a driver and photographer before becoming his gallerist, and began selling Banksy's work to friends. By his own account he soon sold more of Banksy's prints than the artist's then agent, and both Vanity Fair and The Times described him as the dealer who "launched Banksy's career".

Lazarides and Banksy launched the Pictures on Walls website in 2001, selling prints by graffiti and street artists, and Lazarides established an in-house print studio, Lazarides Editions, to produce prints with the artists. The market in street art became commercially successful in 2007, shortly before the 2008 recession, with Banksy's work Laugh Now selling for £228,000 at auction in early 2008. Andrew Child wrote in the Financial Times: "If there had been one individual responsible for whipping up and sustaining the fever around urban art, and who stood to lose most from its demise, it was Steve Lazarides."

Lazarides opened his first gallery, in a former shop in Soho, London, in early 2006. In 2007 the gallery held Invader's first London solo exhibition, Space Invader's Invasion London and Rubik Bad Men II. Sky News credited him with launching the careers of artists including Invader, JR and Vhils. Lazarides also represented the portrait painter Jonathan Yeo and the English painter Antony Micallef.

In 2009 he moved headquarters from Charing Cross Road into a five-storey townhouse on Rathbone Place, near Oxford Street, his third gallery; its first exhibition was by the Portuguese street artist Vhils. In December 2016 Lazarides opened the Banksy Prints Gallery in the Mondrian London hotel on the South Bank, dedicated to Banksy's prints and Lazarides' photographs of the artist. In January 2018 he opened Lazinc, a two-storey gallery on Sackville Street in Mayfair, in partnership with the Qatari businessman Wissam Al Mana.

In September 2019, Lazarides left Lazinc to pursue independent projects, criticising the "snobbery of the art world".

=== Post-Banksy ===
Lazarides stopped working with Banksy around 2008; the BBC and HuffPost give 2008, while The Sunday Times and Sky News give 2009. The reasons were not made public. Lazarides has said that he wanted to work with other artists and that there was no animosity, although the two no longer speak. In 2014 he staged Banksy: The Unauthorised Retrospective at Sotheby's S2 gallery in London, an exhibition and sale of about 70 works; he told the BBC that Banksy would "hate it".

Lazarides began to organise shows that "would not look out of place on a Turner Prize shortlist". He also staged annual off-site exhibitions in London during the Frieze Art Fair, beginning with the Shadow Lounge Auction in 2007 and the Shut Down Show in 2008, followed by three shows in The Old Vic Tunnels from 2010 to 2012.

The first, Hell's Half Acre (12–17 October 2010), was held in The Old Vic Tunnels beneath Waterloo station and co-curated with the actor Kevin Spacey, then artistic director of the Old Vic. Based on Dante's Inferno, it divided the tunnels into the nine circles of Hell, with each artist making work on their own interpretation of hell. Participating artists included Conor Harrington, Mark Jenkins, George Osodi, Christian Lemmerz, Doug Foster, Jonathan Yeo, Paul Insect and Tokujin Yoshioka. Lazarides described it as "a vision of our hellish society under coalition rule". Writing in Cool Hunting, Leonora Oppenheim called it "one of the most exciting art shows this decade".

He returned to the tunnels in October 2011 with Minotaur, which included a maze with a sound installation by Thom Yorke, work by Stanley Donwood, Jonathan Yeo, Antony Micallef, Conor Harrington, Doug Foster and Lucy McLauchlan, and a pop-up restaurant. Bedlam (9–21 October 2012), the third and last of the Old Vic Tunnels shows, took its theme from London's Bethlem Royal Hospital and included work by Tessa Farmer, Tobias Klein, Tina Tsang and Artists Anonymous. The sixth of the Frieze-week shows, BRUTAL (15–27 October 2013), was presented with The Vinyl Factory at 180 The Strand and included work by Cleon Peterson, DALeast, Todd James, Pose, Conor Harrington, Mark Jenkins, Brad Downey and James Lavelle.

=== Banksy Captured ===
Lazarides selected about 12,000 photographs he had taken while working with Banksy and self-published them as Banksy Captured in late 2019. The first edition of 5,000 copies sold out within days, sold through his website and Instagram. A second volume followed in 2020. It includes photographs of Banksy's 2006 Los Angeles exhibition Barely Legal and of his unauthorised installation inside London's Natural History Museum.

Lazarides is among the interviewees in the documentary Banksy and the Rise of Outlaw Art, which was screened in cinemas in May 2021.

=== Laz Emporium ===
In 2020 Lazarides launched Laz Emporium, an online store selling art, prints, homeware and Banksy ephemera. In October 2021 it opened a shop on Lexington Street in Soho, London, which was relaunched in February 2022 with an exhibition space, House of Laz, beneath it; it sold editions and design collaborations with artists including Charming Baker, Jake Chapman, Jamie Hewlett and Jonathan Yeo, made at a studio in the Gloucestershire countryside. The first show there, Rave Captured, was his first solo exhibition and featured his 1992 photographs of rave culture in North East England. In 2022 Lazarides commissioned Mark Jenkins to make Kristina, a life-sized sculpture in packing tape and foam filler of Lazarides' sister slumped with her face in a bowl of soup, which was shown in the shop's window. On 25 November 2022 police forced their way into the locked shop after a member of the public reported an unconscious woman inside, and found the sculpture.

In October 2024 Lazarides sold his archive of Banksy artworks and memorabilia at Julien's Auctions in Los Angeles, in a sale titled Under Duress: The Banksy Archive of Steve Lazarides. He told The Guardian that he wanted to return to photography.
