= Maytree (organisation) =

UK health charity

Maytree is a respite centre, located in the London Borough of Islington, England, for people who are feeling suicidal. It is a charitable organisation that opened in October 2002. It is located in a terraced house in north London, and provides a one-off stay of five days and four nights for up to four guests at a time. Contact is generally severed following a stay, although help is provided for guests regarding their long-term wellbeing after Maytree.

== Aims and objectives ==
Maytree aims to support people in suicidal crisis. It provides a non medical environment where people who are feeling suicidal can rest, reflect and talk confidentially. The idea behind Maytree is that people who are in a suicidal crisis are able to come to a place where they can feel safe and secure, but also a place where they can talk through their problems. Maytree is a registered charity and provides this service at no cost. Maytree is intended to help those in a one-off suicidal crisis, as well as those that have longer term mental health problems. Its overall goal is to reduce suicide ideation.

== How Maytree works ==
The Maytree model to suicide prevention is a therapeutic approach, based on the principle of befriending.

=== Befriending ===
The concept of befriending, a term originally used by Samaritans, is a process based on a relationship of compassion and trust to facilitate changes in thoughts, feelings, understanding, intentions and actions that may lead to suicide.

Befriending intends to enable another person to feel heard and valued. Ideally, the befriender discards assumptions, offers unconditional acceptance, compassion, empathy and concern, whilst respecting and encouraging the other's autonomy and sense of equality. The essence of befriending is the giving of undivided attention to the other, tuning in and connecting to mood and feelings, assimilating consciously and intuitively every aspect of the others presence.

=== Assessment of suitability ===
All potential guests are assessed before an offer of stay is made. The process of assessment begins at the first contact, via an agency or a self-referral. Maytree accepts referrals from GPs, hospitals, psychotherapists, counsellors, friends, family and self-referrals, nationwide. Following a series of telephone conversations between potential guests and volunteers, a one-hour informal conversation will determine for both parties whether a stay is in everyone's best interests. Maytree is not for everyone so alternative options are explored for those who are not considered to benefit from a brief period of respite.

=== Characteristics of Maytree guests ===
Maytree has had 300 guests in the period up to January 2007, the majority from London, but also from all over England.

== Analysis ==
Analysis of the Maytree model carried out by independent researchers in 2007 and 2012 found that a stay at the Maytree house had positive outcomes for individuals experiencing suicidal crisis. The 2007 found that the Maytree approach offered potential "for a benign cycle to be established", this was supported by the 2012 study which conducted interviews with ex-guests of Maytree and found that the "large majority of guests felt less suicidal during their stay and for months afterwards. Furthermore, many guests felt their stay was 'transformational', indicating that Maytree had a significant and powerful impact which led them to reappraise their lives."

== See also ==
- The Samaritans
- Mental health in the United Kingdom
- Suicide in the United Kingdom
