= Campaign Against Living Miserably =

UK charity

- Abbreviation: CALM
- Formation: 2006
- Purpose: Suicide prevention
- Headquarters: London
- Region served: UK
- Chair of Trustees: James Scroggs
- CEO: Simon Gunning
- Budget: £10.75 million income (for year to March 2024)
- Staff: 66
- Website: www.thecalmzone.net

Campaign Against Living Miserably, or CALM, is a registered charity based in England.

CALM runs a free, confidential and anonymous helpline as well as a web chat service, offering help, advice and information to anyone who is struggling or in crisis.

== History ==
=== Pilot and relaunch ===
CALM was initially a Department of Health pilot project launched in late 1997 in Manchester with the help of Tony Wilson, and then rolled out to Merseyside in 2000. It was a helpline targeted specifically at young men who were unlikely to contact mainstream services and who were at greater risk of suicide. Jane Powell was commissioned to launch the project and ran it until 2000. When funding for the pilot project ceased in 2004/5, Powell relaunched the pilot as a registered charity in 2006, working with some of the pilot's original commissioners and with Wilson as a founding trustee.

In 2015, rapper and singer-songwriter Professor Green was named as CALM's patron, and the campaign's trustees board includes health professionals and leading figures from the worlds of music, advertising, and management, as well as relatives of men who have taken their own lives. Robin Millar and David Baddiel are former patrons.

The campaign has brought in significant pro bono advertising support from agencies such as Ogilvy Advertising, Tullo Marshall Warren, MTV, and Metro, and most recently Topman and BMB. This has brought CALM a significant number of advertisements on billboards, on TV, on the London Underground and on radio.

In November 2018, CALM partnered with UKTV channel Dave to create a campaign called "Be The Mate You'd Want". This started with a 3-minute ad break, voiced by comedian James Acaster, encouraging the viewer to text, chat or tweet someone who needs support. It occurred again in July 2019, this time with a "comedy festival in an ad break" which featured comedians Ahir Shah, Alex Horne, Dane Baptiste, Darren Harriott, David Mumeni, Ed Gamble, Elf Lyons, Jamali Maddix, Jessie Cave, Lou Sanders, Maisie Adam, Natasia Demetriou, Phil Wang, Pierre Novelli, Sindhu Vee, Stevie Martin and Zoe Lyons, with Jessica Knappett providing intro and outro voiceover.

=== Project84 ===
In 2018, the charity commissioned the artists Mark Jenkins and Sandra Fernandez to create Project84, an art installation in London. The work was sponsored by Harry's and designed to raise awareness of adult male suicide.

=== Conversations Against Living Miserably ===
In May 2019, CALM announced a partnership with Dave for a podcast called Conversations Against Living Miserably hosted by Lauren Pattison and Aaron Gillies talking to comedians about their mental health.

=== After Life benches ===
In 2022, in collaboration with Netflix, a mental health initiative involved installing park benches around the UK, inspired by scenes from the TV series After Life, wherein Tony, played by Ricky Gervais, and Ann, played by Penelope Wilton held many conversations about mental health.

== See also ==
- Mental health in the United Kingdom
- Suicide in the United Kingdom
