= Project84 =

Temporary art installation in London, England

Coordinates: 51.5072°N 0.1113°W

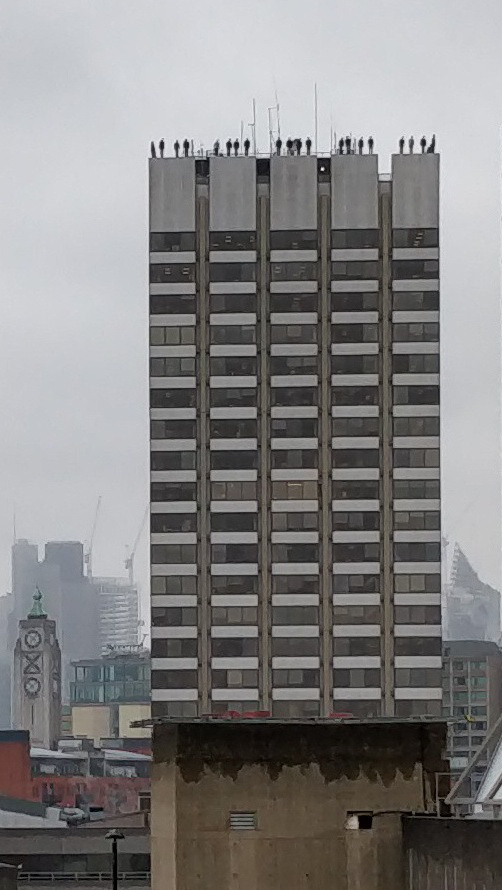
- Artist: Mark Jenkins; Sandra Fernandez
- Completion date: 26 March 2018
- Medium: 84 statues
- Subject: Male suicide victims
- Location: London
- Website: www.projecteightyfour.com

Project84 was an art installation comprising life-size statues of 84 men on top of the ITV buildings at Southbank in London, England. It aimed to highlight the fact that, in the United Kingdom, an average 84 men die by suicide each week.

Each of the statues represents a specific, named individual who died by suicide, and whose biographies are available on the project's website.

The installation was created by artist Mark Jenkins and his collaborator Sandra Fernandez, at the instigation of the charity 'CALM' (Campaign Against Living Miserably) with sponsorship from Harry's. It was launched on the ITV programme This Morning on 26 March 2018, and remained there for five days.

== See also ==
- Event Horizon (sculpture)
