= Befriender =

Type of volunteer

Befrienders are carefully selected volunteers, from a variety of organisations and mental health charities, who are trained to provide support and companionship to lonely, or emotionally distressed, people. Befrienders will usually visit for an hour or so per week. The meeting is usually arranged to suit the person's needs, either at home, or at a neutral venue. Some befriending schemes include social events, creative classes, or self-help groups.

== Selection ==
Training can take upwards of 10 weeks before a befriender is allocated a case. During the befriending process, continuous support is provided, through regular group meetings and individual meetings with a coordinator. Befrienders assignments are chosen on the basis of ethnicity, gender (usually the same sex as the person requiring help), age and needs of the person requiring help.

== Effectiveness ==
Unlike professional careers, such as social workers, befrienders can become emotionally involved with their case, which often results in a more positive outcome as they are able to engage at a much deeper level.

== See also ==
- Peer support
- Peer support specialist
- Befrienders Worldwide
