= Event Horizon (sculpture) =

Public sculpture installation by Antony Gormley

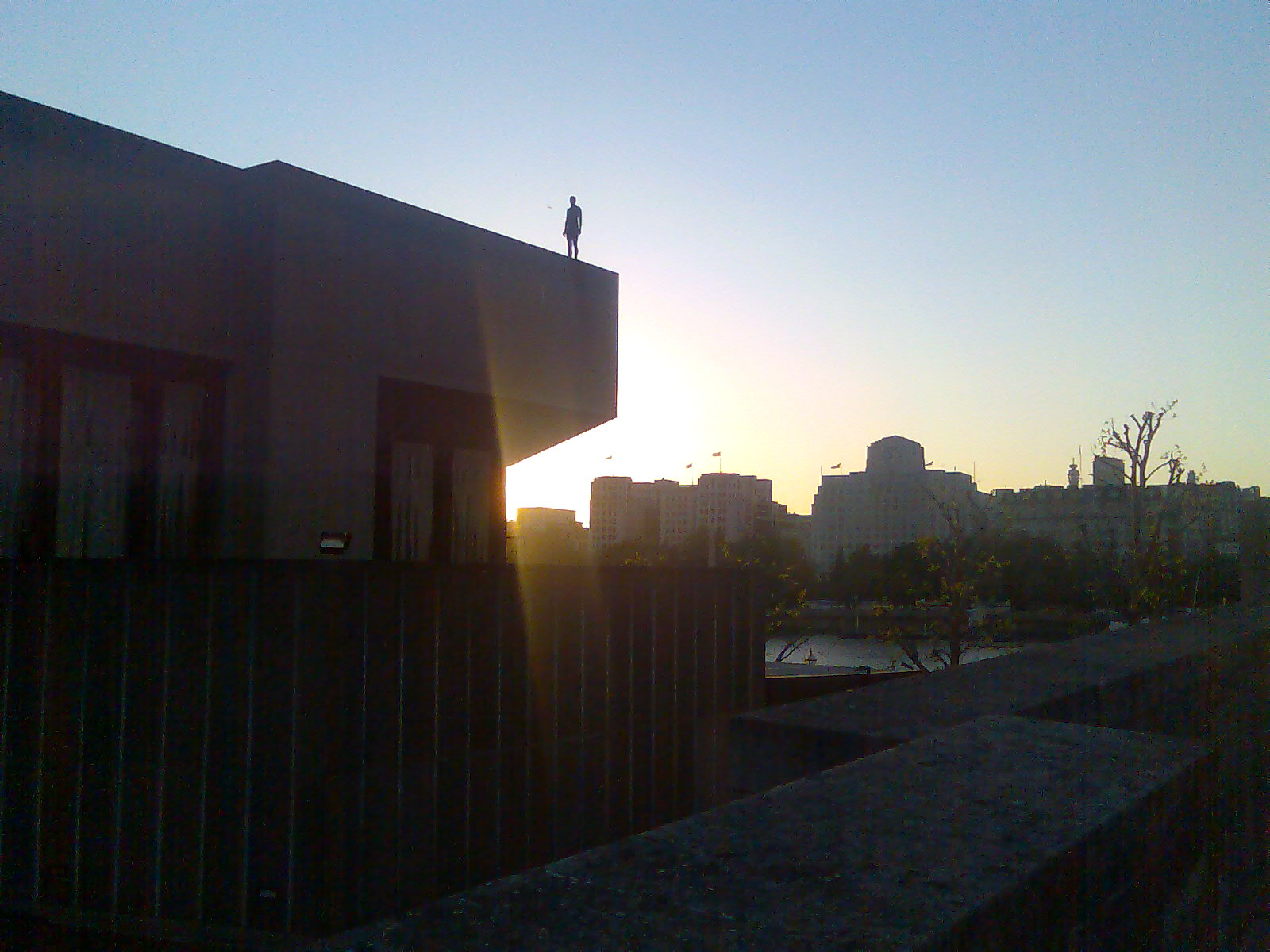
- One of 31 statues placed on top of prominent buildings next to the river Thames
- Artist: Antony Gormley
- Year: 2007
- Medium: Fiberglass and cast iron
- Subject: Self-portrait
- Location: London
- Website: New York installation guide

Event Horizon is the name of a large-scale public sculpture installation by the British artist Antony Gormley. First displayed in London in 2007, they were later displayed in New York, downtown São Paulo and Rio de Janeiro, Brazil. Gormley describes his statues as "...showing solitary figures installed in groups yet retaining their sense of solitude and reflection."

== Installations ==
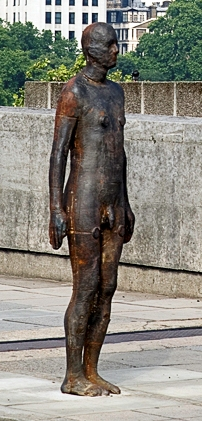
A closer look at one of the figures, which were cast from Gormley's own body

Originally mounted in London in 2007, the project consists of 31 life-size anatomically correct male bodies, 27 constructed of fiberglass and four of cast iron, all cast from the body of the artist himself. which were placed on top of prominent buildings along the London's South Bank – for example the Shell Building and Waterloo Bridge. Part of Gormley's 2007 retrospective exhibition Blind Light at the Hayward Gallery, it was best viewed from the gallery's terraces. The statues were occasionally mistaken as suicide attempts. The installation was taken down in August and September 2007. Gormley had previously constructed a similar project, Another Place, in Crosby Beach, Merseyside, England.

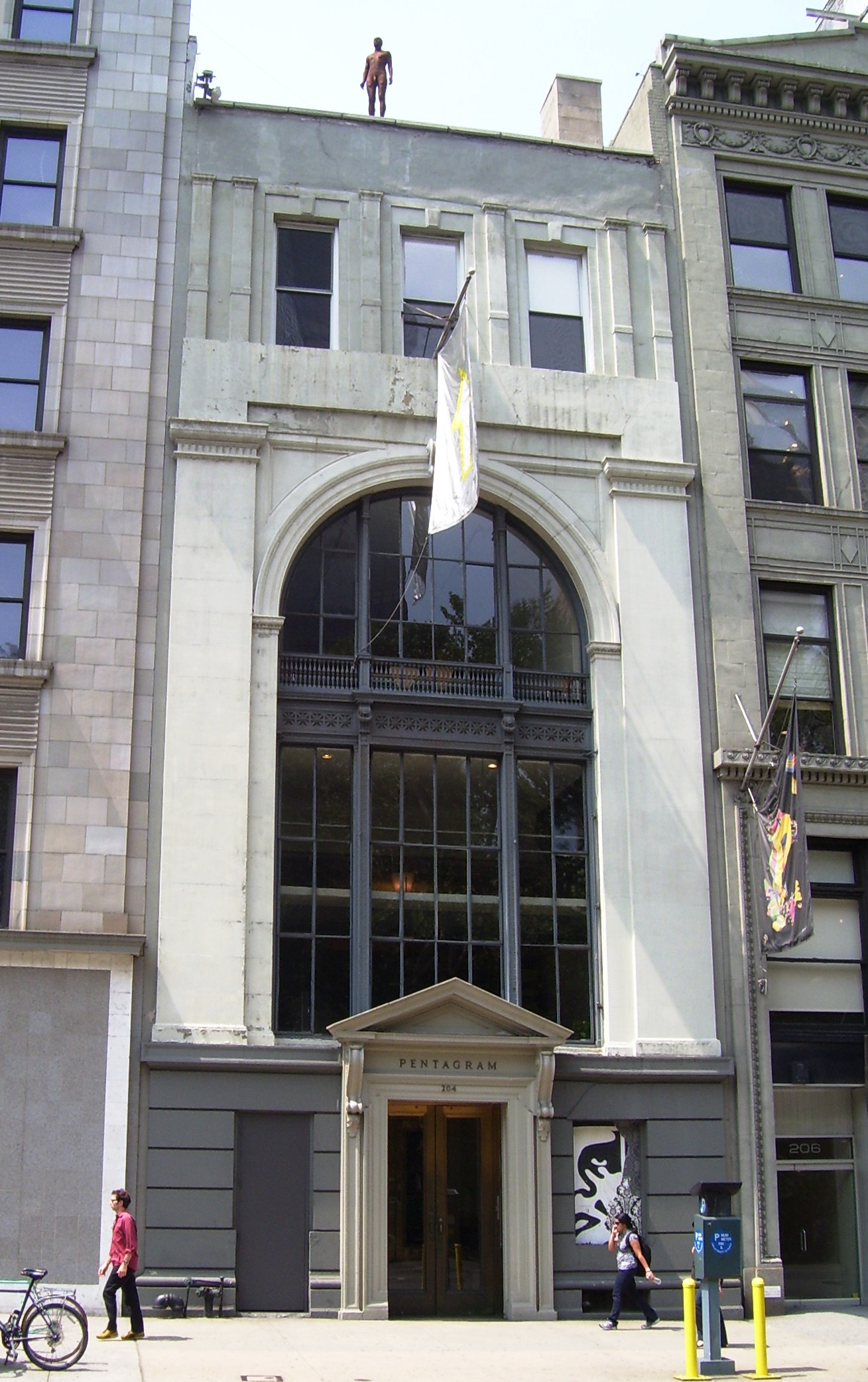
An Event Horizon statue over Madison Square

In 2010, the Event Horizon sculptures were installed in New York City at sites around Madison Square, as far downtown as Union Square and as far uptown as the Empire State Building. The 27 fiberglass figures were placed on setbacks and tops of buildings, while the four cast iron figures were on the ground in Madison Square Park. The installation was sponsored by the Madison Square Park Conservancy. The 2012 installation in São Paulo and the 2015–16 show in Hong Kong are the same as the London design, presented by British Council partnered with K11 Art Foundation.

== Reception ==
Critic Howard Halle said of it that "Using distance and attendant shifts of scale within the very fabric of the city, [Event Horizon] creates a metaphor for urban life and all the contradictory associations – alienation, ambition, anonymity, fame – it entails." Both in New York, London and Hong Kong, the figures were mistaken as suicide attempts. The installation's display at Chater House in Hong Kong was cancelled when US investment bank JPMorgan, which has offices in the 30-storey skyscraper, asked its landlord, Hongkong Land – the sponsor of Event Horizon – to cancel its support for the show after bank employee Dennis Li Junjie jumped to his death from the building's roof in 2014.

== Artist's interpretation ==
Gormley said of the London installation that "it was great to see an individual or groups of people pointing at the horizon. This transfer of the stillness of sculpture to the stillness of an observer is exciting to me: reflexivity becoming shared." Of the New York site he said that "Within the condensed environment of Manhattan's topography, the level of tension between the palpable, the perceivable and the imaginable is heightened because of the density and scale of the buildings" and that in this context, the project should "activate the skyline in order to encourage people to look around. In this process of looking and finding, or looking and seeking, one perhaps re-assesses one's own position in the world and becomes aware of one's status of embedment."

== In popular culture ==
One of the figures from Event Horizon was featured in the opening credits of the 2008 first episode of the British TV series Ashes to Ashes.

== See also ==
- Project84
