= Belly cast =

Keepsake cast of a pregnant abdomen

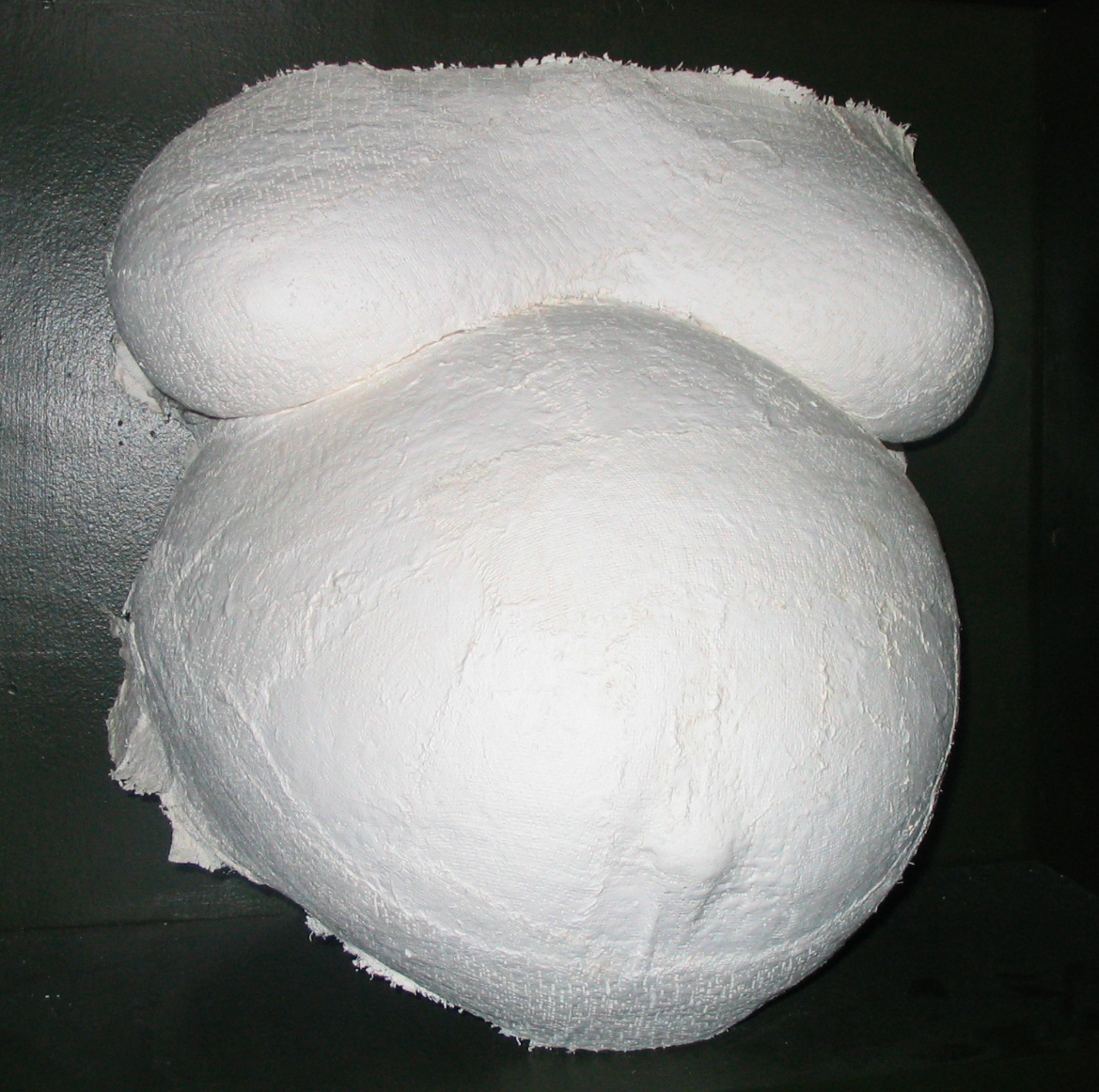
Plaster belly cast of pregnant torso

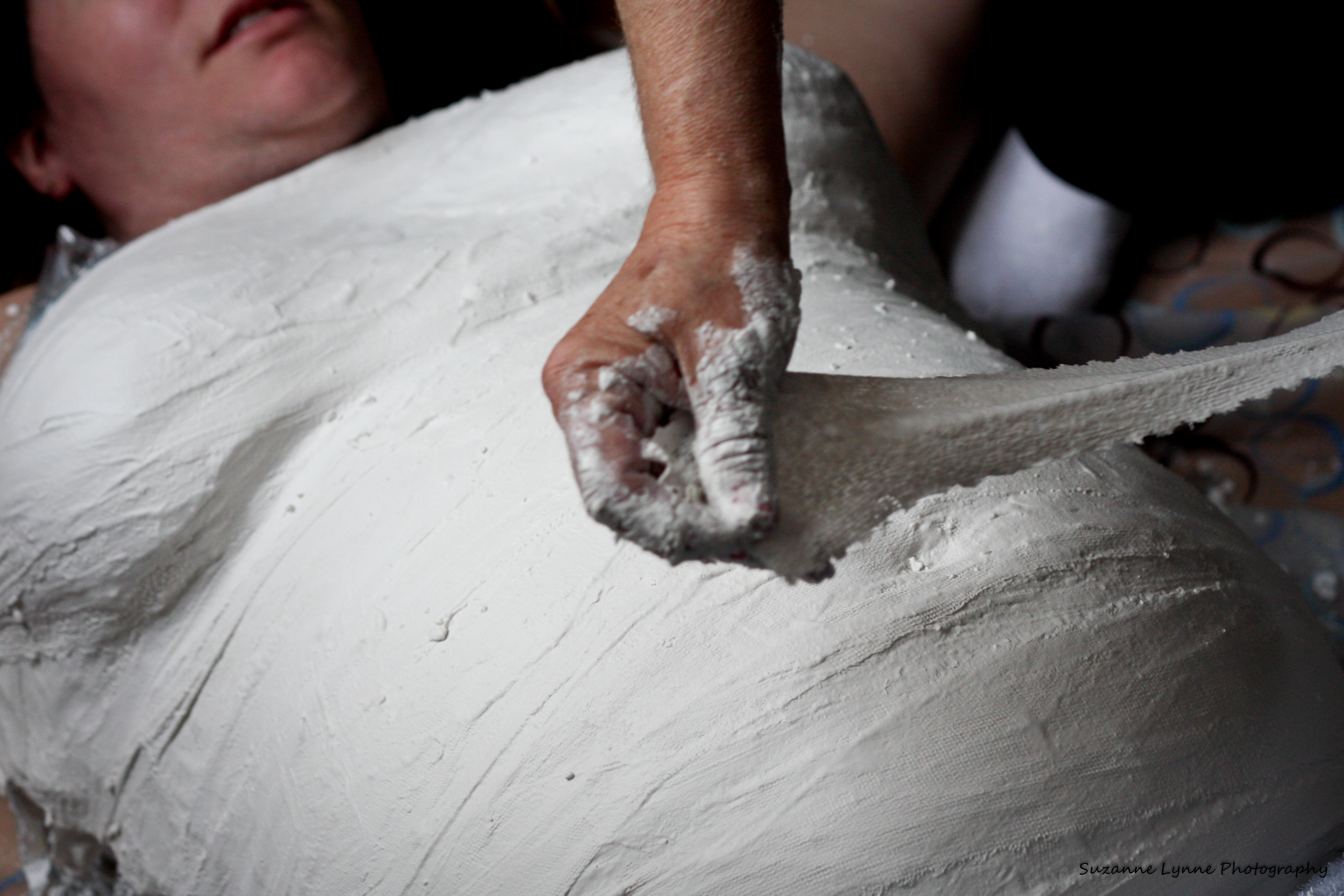
Applying plaster for a belly cast

A belly cast is a three-dimensional plaster sculpture of a woman's pregnant abdomen as a keepsake of her pregnancy. It can also be known as a belly mask, pregnancy belly cast, a pregnant plaster cast, or prenatal cast.

Belly casts are most often made toward the end of the third trimester of pregnancy, though a series of casts may also be made during the pregnancy. They are made by preparing the skin with a coating of Vaseline or a similar lubricant and adding strips of wet plaster gauze over the abdomen to make the cast. Some women also cast their breasts, arms, hands and thighs into a full torso sculpture. The plaster sets in about 20–30 minutes but some fast-setting strips set in five minutes. Once set, the cast is gently removed by the mother using a wriggling motion. It takes one or two days for the cast to dry completely.

Gesso can be painted onto the mask after drying to stop it absorbing moisture from the air. Gesso also works as a surface primer for painting and preserving it. The cast can be decorated with any number of finishes or designs including the baby's hand and foot prints, or left in its natural state. Most popular decorations include painting and decoupage, while some belly casts are mosaicked.
