= Liverpool School Board elections =

Organisation in England to oversee education in a local area 1870 - 1902

Liverpool School Board was one of the school boards in England and Wales established under the Elementary Education Act 1870 (33 & 34 Vict. c. 75).

Liverpool School Board was composed of 15 directly elected members. Each voter had fifteen votes to cast and was "entitled to divide his fifteen votes amongst as many of the candidates as he pleases, or to give whole fifteen to one candidate."

The majority of members elected stood on religious tickets.

School boards were abolished by the Education Act 1902, which transferred control of state funded schools in Liverpool to the Education Committee of Liverpool City Council.

== Liverpool School Board elections ==
- 1900 Liverpool School Board election
- 1897 Liverpool School Board election
- 1894 Liverpool School Board election
- 1891 Liverpool School Board election
- 1888 Liverpool School Board election
- 1885 Liverpool School Board election
- 1882 Liverpool School Board election
- 1879 Liverpool School Board election
- 1876 Liverpool School Board election
- 1873 Liverpool School Board election
- 1870 Liverpool School Board election
