= 1981 Crosby by-election =

By-election held on 26 November 1981

← 1979	26 November 1981	1983 →

Crosby parliamentary seat
- Turnout: 57,297 (69.3%)
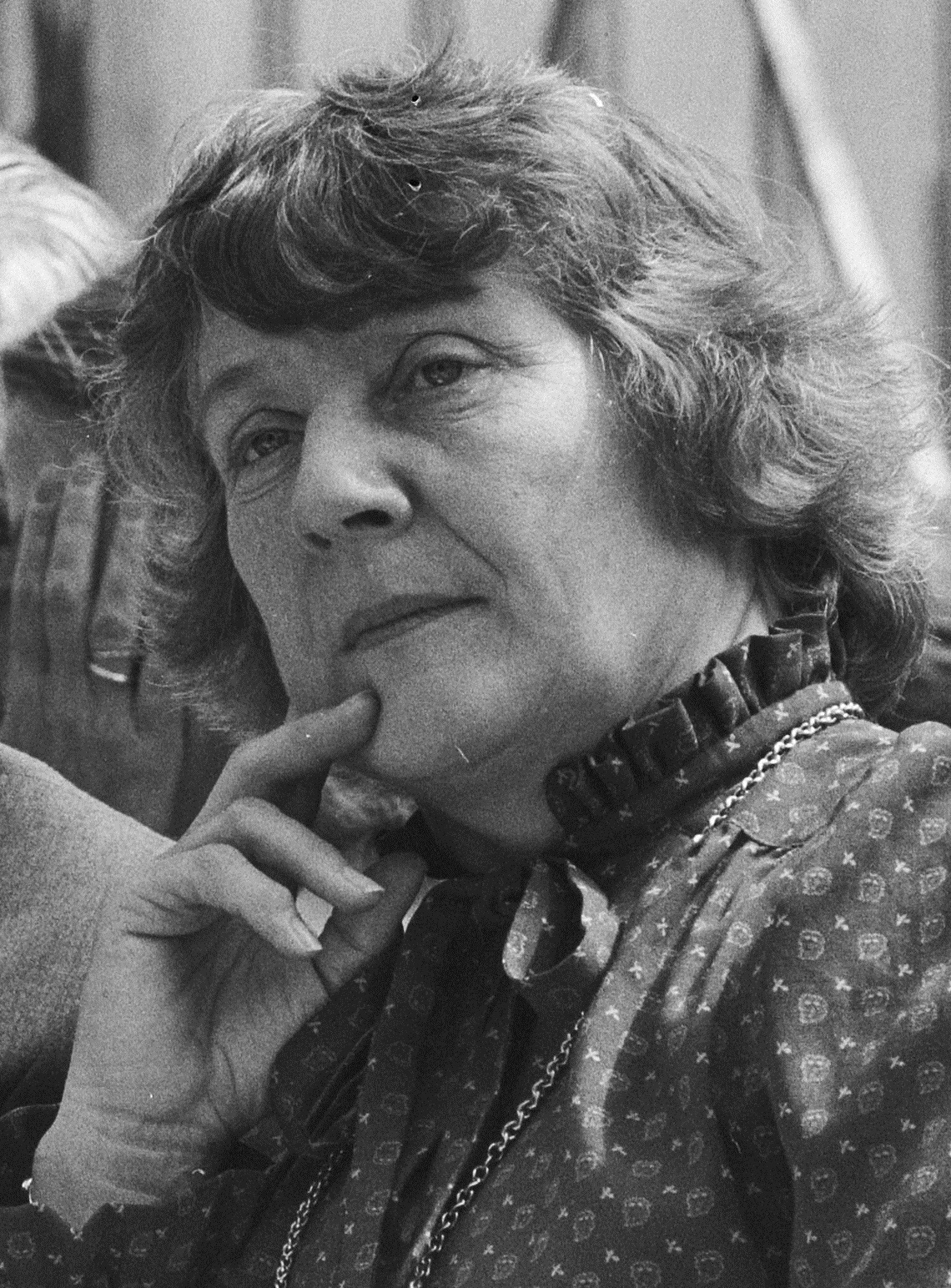

	First party	Second party	Third party
Candidate	Shirley Williams	John Butcher	John Backhouse
Party	SDP	Conservative	Labour
Popular vote	28,118	22,829	5,450
Percentage	49.07%	39.84%	9.51%
Swing	▲33.83%	▼17.11%	▼15.87%
MP before election
Sir Graham Page
Conservative
Subsequent MP
Shirley Williams
SDP

The 1981 Crosby by-election was a by-election held in England on 26 November 1981 to elect a new Member of Parliament (MP) for the House of Commons constituency of Crosby on Merseyside. It followed the death of Crosby's MP Sir Graham Page, of the Conservative Party.

== Background ==
The Crosby by-election took place against an almost unprecedented backdrop of division and disunity within both the Conservative and Labour parties, combined with social unrest and economic recession in the United Kingdom as a whole.

The opposition Labour Party was riven by factionalism and divided over entryism – in particular, that of the Militant tendency. It expounded left-wing policies, with perceived weak leadership provided by Michael Foot, who was routinely ridiculed by the national press.

Prime Minister Margaret Thatcher had recently sacked or neutralised the remaining allies of Edward Heath, the previous more moderate Conservative leader, and the country was being subjected to the full rigours of monetarism, her economic policy. Inflation was over 10%, with unemployment climbing towards three million, a figure not seen since the 1930s.

In July 1981 the most intense and prolonged instance of public unrest in the United Kingdom in the late twentieth century had occurred in the Toxteth area of Liverpool, following on the heels of similar riots in the St Paul's area of Bristol, Handsworth and Brixton.

== Constituency ==
Crosby was regarded as a very safe seat for the Conservatives. Page had sat as the constituency MP since the 1953 Crosby by-election, and the party had held the seat since its creation in 1950, also easily holding its predecessor seat, Waterloo since 1918. The constituency contained some of the wealthiest areas in the North of England. The districts of Blundellsands in Crosby and Freshfield in Formby had more in common with the likes of Surrey than they did with the nearby City of Liverpool. Only Waterloo and Seaforth, at the southern end of the constituency could be considered as working-class. The seat consisted of three main conurbations; Formby, to the north, Maghull, to the east, and Crosby, to the south.

Crosby constituency had one of the top-ten highest levels of owner-occupation in the country, and had one of the largest electorates in England with over 83,000 voters.

Notably, Crosby had one of the largest Roman Catholic electorates in England and Wales, with about one third of the voters adherents of the faith. There were no fewer than eighteen Catholic churches in the constituency, numerous Catholic schools including St. Mary's College, and several Catholic charities including Jospice. The Catholicism of the area could be ascribed to two factors: those of Liverpool-Irish ancestry whose families had migrated the six miles north from the city-centre over the previous century to become the middle-class intelligentsia, doctors, lawyers and the like; and a significant indigenous group who traced their roots to the village of Little Crosby, one of the oldest extant Catholic villages in England.

== Candidates ==
At the 1979 general election, Page had gained more than half the votes cast. For the by-election, the Conservatives stood John Butcher, a chartered accountant and a Royal Navy reservist, living in Cheshire and working in Warrington.

The Labour Party had taken second place in 1979, with just over a quarter of the vote. Their candidate had been Tony Mulhearn, a leading figure on Liverpool City Council, and a prominent member of the Militant tendency, a far left wing group with considerable influence in the city. For the by-election, the party instead chose John Backhouse, the Chair of the Crosby Labour Party, a local teacher and a Campaign for Nuclear Disarmament activist.

The Social Democratic Party (SDP) was formed by a split of some prominent figures on the right of the Labour Party in March 1981. Its main figures were the "Gang of Four" – Shirley Williams, Roy Jenkins, David Owen and Bill Rodgers. Of the four, Williams and Jenkins were out of Parliament, with the party keen for them to stand in by-elections under their new party label. Following the agreement of an electoral pact with the Liberal Party, who had come third in Crosby in 1979, with 15% of the vote, the two parties supported Jenkins in the 1981 Warrington by-election, where he narrowly failed to capture the seat. At Crosby, they agreed to support Williams in an attempt to become the SDP's first successful Parliamentary candidate. Williams, it transpired later, had no particular urge to return to what she described as "an old men's club", and felt her talents would be better used outside Parliament. However, her father, George Catlin, had been born in nearby Liverpool, and the constituency's large Roman Catholic electorate seemed tailor-made for a practising Catholic like Shirley Williams.

The previous month the Liberal Bill Pitt had won the Croydon North West by-election by-election, having finished in a distant third place in the same constituency in 1979. In the wake of that result Liberal leader David Steel had said that the Alliance seemed to have taken support away from both of the main parties in almost equal measure, and as a result he believed "that we are now unstoppable." The victorious Pitt claimed that the Alliance had "caught the imagination of the voters" and that as consequence there were "no longer any safe seats for Tory or Labour in the country." The political editor of The Glasgow Herald, Geoffrey Parkhouse, said the Croydon result "shattered" both Labour and the Conservative leadership who would fear Pitt's prediction. He also stated that the result made Williams the favourite to win in Crosby.

The fourth candidate in 1979 had been from the Ecology Party, receiving 2.4% of the vote, in one of the party's better results. For the by-election, the party selected Richard Small, a local lecturer.

John Desmond Lewis, a 22-year-old student from Hayes in Greater London, contested the election as the President of the Cambridge University Raving Loony Society. For the election, he changed his name by deed poll to Tarquin Fin-tim-lin-bin-whin-bim-lim Bus Stop-F'tang-F'tang-Olé-Biscuitbarrel, the outlandish name of a character from Monty Python's "Election Night Special" sketch. In the sketch, the character by that name wins Luton for the Silly Party.

Veteran candidate Bill Boaks stood as "Democratic Monarchist, Public Safety, White Resident", while Tom Keen stood in support of a Conservative-Liberal Alliance. John Kennedy stood to highlight the case of seven students at Middlesex Polytechnic who had been suspended after a sit-in protest demanding nursery facilities, while Donald Potter, a former Young Conservative and founder of the "Close Encounters" lonely heart group, stood to promote his idea of a national phone line for lonely people.

== Result ==
With the result declared at Chesterfield High School, Williams won the election, taking almost half the votes cast and became the first MP to be elected under the SDP label. The Conservatives and Labour both fell back by more than 15% of the vote and dropped to second and third positions respectively. For Labour, Backhouse took less than 10% of the vote and lost his deposit, while none of the other candidates achieved 1% of the votes cast. Upon her victory, Williams declared "To the day, eight months all to the day. Given that, I think tonight's result is a miracle by anybody's standard's. Don't you?" She went on to declare that "there is no a single safe seat left in the country", in reference to the constituency having previously been a safe Conservative seat.

Jenkins won another seat for the SDP at the Glasgow Hillhead by-election in 1982, but the party suffered setbacks at the 1983 general election, and Williams lost Crosby to a new Conservative candidate aided by the fact that boundary changes had been implemented bringing Aintree into the constituency in place of Waterloo and Seaforth (which transferred to Bootle Constituency).

When the results were declared, Lewis was referred to by the Returning Officer as "Mr Tarquin Biscuit-Barrel". He later worked with Screaming Lord Sutch to form the Official Monster Raving Loony Party for the 1983 Bermondsey by-election.

Crosby by-election 1981
Party	Candidate	Votes	%	±%
SDP	Shirley Williams	28,118	49.07	+33.83
Conservative	John Butcher	22,829	39.84	−17.11
Labour	John Backhouse	5,450	9.51	−15.87
Ecology	Richard Small	480	0.83	−1.61
Raving Loony	Tarquin Fin-tim-lin-bin-whin-bim-lim Bus Stop-F'tang-F'tang-Olé-Biscuitbarrel	223	0.39	New
Independent	Tom Keen	99	0.17	New
Democratic Monarchist, Public Safety, White Resident	Bill Boaks	36	0.06	New
Independent	John Kennedy	31	0.05	New
Independent	Donald Potter	31	0.05	New
Majority		5,289	9.23	N/A
Turnout		57,297	69.3	−5.9
SDP gain from Conservative		Swing		

== Previous result ==
General election 1979: Crosby
Party	Candidate	Votes	%	±%
Conservative	Graham Page	34,768	56.95	+5.44
Labour	Tony Mulhearn	15,496	25.38	−5.06
Liberal	Anthony Hill	9,302	15.24	−2.81
Ecology	Peter Hussey	1,489	2.44	+2.44
Majority		19,272	31.56	+10.49
Turnout		61,055	75.18	+1.67
Conservative hold		Swing		
