= Frederic Sellers =

British barrister and judge

Capt. Sellers

Sir Frederic Aked Sellers_{,} MC** (14 January 1893 – 20 March 1979) was a British barrister and judge. He was a Lord Justice of Appeal from 1957 to 1968.

== Biography ==
Sellers was born in Liverpool, the youngest son of John Shuttleworth Sellers, a Liverpool shipowner, and Elizabeth (née Stuart). He was educated at Silcoates School and the University of Liverpool. In 1917 he married Grace Lilian Malin in Derby.

During the First World War, he served with the 13th Battalion, King's Regiment (Liverpool), reaching the rank of captain. He was awarded the Military Cross in 1916 and received two Bars to that decoration in 1918.

In 1919 he was called to the Bar by Gray's Inn and practised in Liverpool and on the Northern Circuit. He took silk in 1935 and was elected a bencher of Gray's Inn in 1938. From 1938 to 1946, he was Recorder of Bolton. He also served as a member of the Bar Council during this period. During the Second World War, Sellers joined the Home Guard. He personally enlisted 70 volunteers, nicknamed 'Sellers'.

Sellers was appointed a Justice of the Queen's Bench Division of the High Court of England and Wales (known as the King's Bench Division until 1952) on 13 February 1946. A few days later he was knighted. He was promoted to be a Lord Justice of Appeal in the Court of Appeal of England and Wales on 11 January 1957. Following that appointment, Sellers was made a member of the Privy Council of the United Kingdom. He retired from his judicial office on 10 January 1968.

=== Political career ===
Sellers was Liberal candidate for Waterloo at the 1929 general election. He was the first Liberal candidate since 1923. In a three-party contest he came third polling 23%. In 1939 he was prospective Liberal party candidate for Sudbury; the planned election was postponed however and he never contested the seat. He contested the 1945 General Election as a Liberal party candidate at Hendon North, coming third.

=== Electoral record ===
General election 1929: Waterloo
Party	Candidate	Votes	%	±%
Unionist	Malcolm Bullock	17,299	52.1	−19.9
Labour	John Clifford Leigh	8,142	24.5	−3.5
Liberal	Frederic Aked Sellers	7,728	23.3	n/a
Majority		9,157	27.6	−16.4
Turnout		33,169		
Unionist hold		Swing	-8.2	

General election 1945: Hendon North
Party	Candidate	Votes	%	±%
Labour	Barbara Ayrton-Gould	18,251	47.61	
Conservative	Edwin William Conquest Flavell	13,607	35.49	
Liberal	Frederic Aked Sellers	6,478	16.90	
Majority		4,644	12.12	
Turnout		38,336	75.09	
Labour win (new seat)				

== Sources ==
- The Judges of England 1272-1990, by Sir John Sainty (Selden Society, 1993)
