= Robert Lowden Connell =

British politician

Sir Robert Lowden Connell KBE JP (6 December 1867 – 27 December 1936) was a British shipowner and Liberal Party politician.

== Background ==
Connell was born a son of Michael O'Connor of Moresby, Cumberland. He was educated at Ghyllbank, Cumberland. In 1899 he married Sarah Webster of Bootle. They had three daughters. He was knighted in 1918.

== Professional career ==
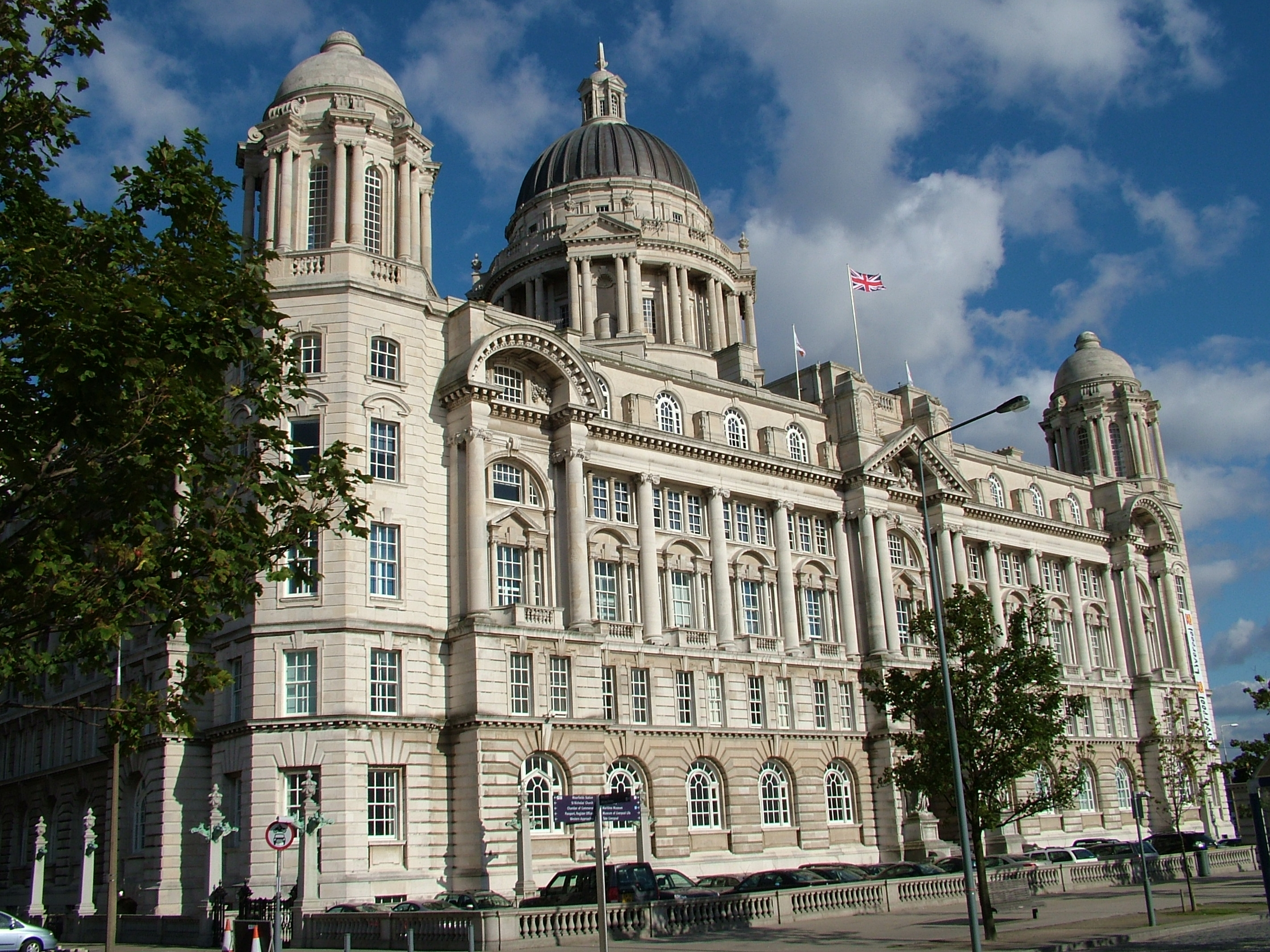
Former offices of the Mersey Docks and Harbour Board

Connell was Chairman of Lowden Connell & Company, Limited. He was a Member of the Mersey Docks and Harbour Board. He was Chairman of the Army Contracts Stores Committee in 1917. He was Deputy Controller of Army Salvage in 1918 and was knighted in the 1918 Birthday Honours. He was a member of the Surplus Government Property Disposal Board from 1919–21.

== Political career ==
Connell was Liberal candidate for the Pontypool division at the 1922 General Election. Pontypool was a Labour seat and he was also faced by a Unionist challenger. He came third polling 28%. He was Liberal candidate for the Waterloo division of Lancashire at the 1923 General Election. It was a safe Unionist seat where the Liberals had come second in 1922. He managed to reduce the Unionist majority but narrowly failed to win. He did not stand for parliament again. He served as a Justice of the peace.

=== Electoral record ===
General Election 1922: Pontypool
Party	Candidate	Votes	%	±%
Labour	Thomas Griffiths	11,198	40.6	
Unionist	Sir Thomas George Jones	8,654	31.4	
Liberal	Sir Robert Lowden Connell	7,733	28.0	
Majority		2,544	9.2	
Turnout				
Labour hold		Swing		

General Election 1923: Waterloo
Party	Candidate	Votes	%	±%
Unionist	Harold Malcolm Bullock	10,615		
Liberal	Sir Robert Lowden Connell	9,965		
Majority		650		
Turnout				
Unionist hold		Swing		
