= 1897 Liverpool School Board election =

Local election in Liverpool, England

Elections to the Liverpool School Board were held in November 1897. These were held every three years, when all fifteen board members were elected. In 1897 there were twenty candidates for the fifteen board member positions.

Each voter had fifteen votes to cast.

After the election, the composition of the School Board was:

Allegiance	Members	±	Votes
Church of England	8		343,646
Non-Sectarian	4		171,881
Catholic	3		206,790
Socialist	0		23,270
Ratepayers	0		8,211
Total Votes cast			753,798
Electorate			101,644
Turnout			49%

* - Retiring board member seeking re-election

Elected

Allegiance	Name	Votes
Non-Sectarian	Anne Jane Davies	48,768
Church of England	James H. Goodyear	47,607
Church of England	Rev. Canon T. M. Lester *	46,459
Non-Sectarian	Thomas C. Ryley *	47,821
Church of England	Colonel G. R. Morrison JP	45,388
Church of England	Rev. W. J. Adams	43,984
Church of England	Rev. George Howell	43,470
Church of England	Hugh A. Bewley	41,253
Church of England	Dr. H. A, Clarke	40,466
Non-Sectarian	Dr. R. J. Lloyd	39,048
Catholic	Michael Fitzpatrick	36,459
Non-Sectarian	Richard G. Hough	36,244
Catholic	Charles McArdle	35,138
Church of England	Rev. J. Bell-Cox	35,019
Catholic	Joseph P. McKenna	34,752

Not Elected

Catholic	William J. Sparrow	34,520
Catholic	Augustine Watts	33,336
Catholic	James F. Taylor	32,585
Socialist	Samuel Reeves	23,270
Ratepayers	Robert A. Bellwood	8,211
