= Albert Buckley =

Albert Buckley CBE DSO* JP

Member of Parliament for Waterloo
- In office 1918–1923
- Preceded by: New constituency
- Succeeded by: Harold Malcolm Bullock

Junior Lord of the Treasury
- In office 1922–1923 Serving with: Douglas King 1922–1923; George Hennessy 1922–1923; Frederick Thomson 1923
- Preceded by: James Parker; Sir John Gilmour
- Succeeded by: Douglas King; George Hennessy; Frederick Thomson; William Cope

Secretary for Overseas Trade
- In office 1923–1923
- Preceded by: Sir William Joynson-Hicks
- Succeeded by: Vacant

Personal details
- Born: 10 April 1877 Great Crosby, Lancashire, England
- Died: 13 November 1965 (aged 88) Hoylake, Cheshire, England
- Party: Conservative

Lt.-Col. Albert Buckley CBE DSO* JP (10 April 1877 – 13 November 1965) was a British Conservative politician and businessman.

== Early life and education ==
Buckley was born in Great Crosby, Lancashire, the son of wool broker William Buckley and Mary Hannah Buckley. His father was a nephew of Edmund Buckley and became a partner in his firm. He was educated at Merchant Taylors' Boys' School, Crosby and Aldenham School.

== War service ==
In the Boer War, he was awarded the Queen's Medal with three clasps. During the First World War, he commanded the 5th Battalion of the King's Liverpool Regiment. He was awarded the Distinguished Service Order and Bar and wounded.

== Career ==
Buckley entered Parliament for Waterloo in the 1918 general election. He held office under Bonar Law as a Junior Lord of the Treasury from 1922 to 1923 and under Bonar Law and later Stanley Baldwin as Secretary for Overseas Trade from March to November 1923. However, as a proponent of Free Trade, Buckley was in disagreement with Baldwin, and his local party withheld its support of him as a prospective candidate. He retired from politics at the 1923 general election and never returned to the House of Commons.

A wool broker by trade, Buckley was a partner in the family firm of Edmund Buckley & Co. He was also chairman and later president of Morris and Jones, Ltd., wholesale grocers in Liverpool. He was chairman of the Liverpool Chamber of Commerce from 1924 to 1928 and served on the Mersey Docks and Harbour Board from 1928 to 1951. He was a magistrate for the city of Liverpool.

From 1931 to 1948, he led the savings movement in Liverpool. He was chairman of the Liverpool Savings Committee from 1931 until its 1942 amalgamation with the Liverpool War Bond Committee, at which point he was appointed chairman of the new body, the Liverpool National Savings Committee. He was appointed a Commander of the Order of the British Empire in the 1946 Birthday Honours for his work in the savings movement.

Buckley was also chairman of the Liverpool Overhead Railway, the Liverpool Gas Company, the Birkenhead Brewery Company, Ltd., and the Bury Felt Manufacturing Company. He was chairman of Lloyd's Bank North-West Committee from 1957 to 1959.

== Personal life ==
Buckley married Elsie Juanita Fisher in 1919. They had three sons and two daughters. He died in November 1965, aged 88, at his home in Hoylake, Cheshire.

Parliament of the United Kingdom
New constituency	Member of Parliament for Waterloo; 1918–1923	Succeeded by Harold Malcolm Bullock
Political offices
Preceded by James Parker; Sir John Gilmour	Junior Lord of the Treasury; 1922–1923; With: Douglas King 1922–1923; George Hennessy 1922–1923; Frederick Thomson 1923	Succeeded by Douglas King; George Hennessy; Frederick Thomson; William Cope
Preceded by Sir William Joynson-Hicks	Secretary for Overseas Trade; 1923	Vacant
