= Crosby (constituency) =

Parliamentary constituency in the United Kingdom, 1950–2010

Coordinates: 53.491°N 3.029°W

- Former borough constituency for the House of Commons
- Boundary of Crosby in Merseyside for the 2005 general election

- Location of Merseyside within England
- County: Merseyside

1950–2010
- Seats: One
- Created from: Waterloo
- Replaced by: Sefton Central, Bootle

Crosby was a constituency in Merseyside, represented in the House of Commons of the Parliament of the United Kingdom from 1950 until 2010. It elected one Member of Parliament (MP) by the first past the post system of election.

== History ==
Prior to 1997, the constituency was seen as a safe seat for the Conservative Party. They held the seat from its creation in 1950 until the death in 1981 of Sir Graham Page. The resulting by-election was notable as it was won by Shirley Williams, one of the "gang of four" senior members of the Labour Party who had founded the new Social Democratic Party (SDP), becoming the first SDP member to be elected. However, Williams lost the seat to the Conservative candidate Malcolm Thornton at the 1983 general election.

Thornton held the seat until the 1997 election, when he lost to Labour's Claire Curtis-Thomas who held the seat until its abolition. On 7 October 2009, it was announced that Curtis-Thomas would stand down at the 2010 general election.

== Boundaries ==
Crosby in Lancashire, boundaries used 1974-83

1950–1955: The Borough of Crosby, and the parish of Ford in the Rural District of West Lancashire.

1955–1974: The Borough of Crosby, and the Urban District of Litherland.

1974–1983: The Borough of Crosby, the Urban District of Formby, and in the Rural District of West Lancashire the parishes of Altcar, Ince Blundell, Maghull, Sefton (part), and Thornton.

1983–1997: The Metropolitan Borough of Sefton wards of Blundellsands, Harington, Manor, Molyneux, Park, Ravenmeols, Sudell, and Victoria.

1997–2010: The Metropolitan Borough of Sefton wards of Blundellsands, Church, Harington, Manor, Ravenmeols, and Victoria.

The predecessor seat to Crosby was the Waterloo constituency, which existed between 1918 and 1950. Crosby constituency covered the whole town of Crosby which includes the localities of Great Crosby, Blundellsands, Brighton-le-Sands, Seaforth, Waterloo, Little Crosby, Hightown and Thornton, as well as the town of Formby and the village of Little Altcar, all in Sefton in Merseyside. On its abolition in 2010 it was bordered to the north by the constituency of Southport, to the east by Lancashire West and Knowsley North and Sefton East, and to the south by Bootle.

Following a review by the Boundary Commission for England, the Crosby constituency was abolished at the 2010 general election. It was replaced by the new Sefton Central seat, which includes parts of the former Knowsley North and Sefton East constituency. As a result, Formby and Little Altcar are part of the new Sefton Central constituency and the town of Crosby has been divided between two constituencies, with the two electoral wards of southern Crosby, Church and Victoria, containing the urbanised bulk of the town which includes the areas of Great Crosby, Waterloo and Seaforth, being absorbed into the expanded Bootle constituency, represented by the Labour MP Joe Benton, and the two electoral wards of northern Crosby, Blundellsands and Manor, which contains residential suburban areas such as, Blundellsands, Brighton-Le-Sands, Little Crosby, Thornton, and Hightown, forming part of the new Sefton Central constituency represented by Bill Esterson, also a Labour MP.

== Members of Parliament ==
Election	Member	Party	Notes
1950	Malcolm Bullock	Conservative	Resigned October 1953
1953 by-election	Graham Page	Conservative	Died October 1981
1981 by-election	Shirley Williams	SDP	
1983	Malcolm Thornton	Conservative	
1997	Claire Curtis-Thomas	Labour	
2010	constituency abolished: see Sefton Central & Bootle		

== Elections ==
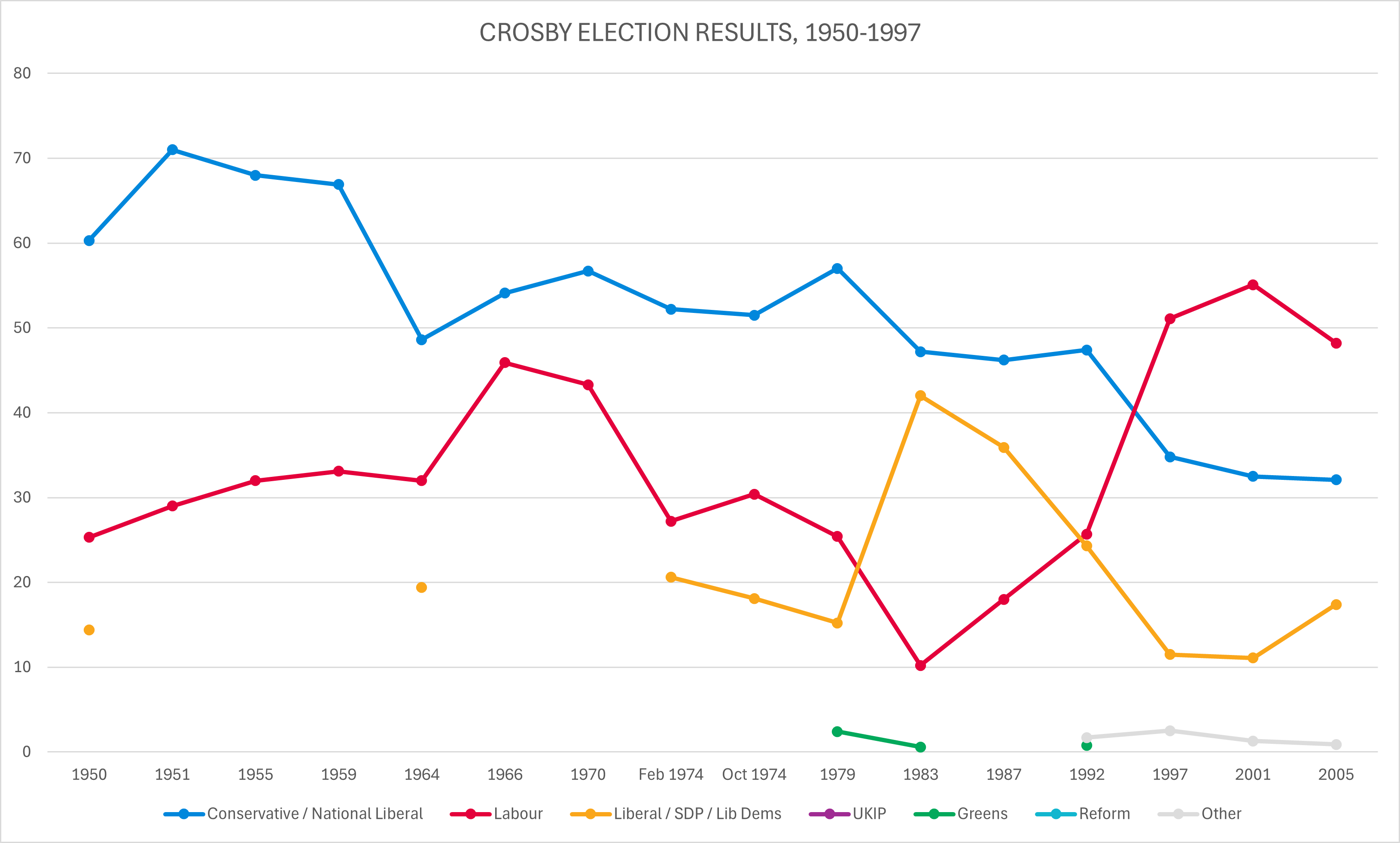
Election results 1950-2005

=== Elections in the 1950s ===
General election 1950: Crosby
Party	Candidate	Votes	%	±%
Conservative	Harold Bullock	22,347	60.26	
Labour	Ronald Lewis	9,403	25.35	
Liberal	James Burnie	5,336	14.39	
Majority		12,944	34.90	
Turnout		37,086	84.50	
Conservative win (new seat)				

General election 1951: Crosby
Party	Candidate	Votes	%	±%
Conservative	Harold Bullock	25,034	70.95	
Labour	Edith Edwards	10,251	29.05	
Majority		14,783	41.90	
Turnout		35,285	79.77	
Conservative hold		Swing		

1953 Crosby by-election
Party	Candidate	Votes	%	±%
Conservative	Graham Page	18,614	68.09	−2.86
Labour	Ernest Adams	7,545	27.60	−1.45
Ind. Conservative	J.A. Freeman	1,180	4.32	New
Majority		11,069	40.49	−1.41
Turnout		27,339		
Conservative hold		Swing		

General election 1955: Crosby
Party	Candidate	Votes	%	±%
Conservative	Graham Page	29,161	68.00	
Labour	Ernest Adams	13,725	32.00	
Majority		15,436	35.99	
Turnout		42,886	73.70	
Conservative hold		Swing		

General election 1959: Crosby
Party	Candidate	Votes	%	±%
Conservative	Graham Page	29,801	66.90	
Labour	Douglas E. Brown	14,745	33.10	
Majority		15,056	33.80	
Turnout		44,546	77.48	
Conservative hold		Swing		

=== Elections in the 1960s ===
General election 1964: Crosby
Party	Candidate	Votes	%	±%
Conservative	Graham Page	21,538	48.63	
Labour	Robert Hodge	14,158	31.97	
Liberal	Norman Sellers	8,590	19.40	New
Majority		7,380	16.66	
Turnout		44,286	76.66	
Conservative hold		Swing		

General election 1966: Crosby
Party	Candidate	Votes	%	±%
Conservative	Graham Page	21,980	54.07	
Labour	Alan John Whipp	18,674	45.93	
Majority		3,306	8.13	
Turnout		40,654	72.19	
Conservative hold		Swing		

=== Elections in the 1970s ===
General election 1970: Crosby
Party	Candidate	Votes	%	±%
Conservative	Graham Page	24,042	56.71	+2.64
Labour	Peter Carswell	18,350	43.29	−2.64
Majority		5,692	13.42	+5.28
Turnout		42,392	71.44	−0.75
Conservative hold		Swing		

1970 notional result on 1974-1983 boundaries: Crosby
Party	Candidate	Votes	%	±%
Conservative		35,200	63.77	
Labour		20,000	36.23	
Majority		15,200	27.54	
Turnout		55,200		
Conservative hold		Swing		

General election February 1974: Crosby
Party	Candidate	Votes	%	±%
Conservative	Graham Page	32,519	52.19	−11.58
Labour	Sean Hughes	16,949	27.20	−9.03
Liberal	Geoffrey Woodcock	12,842	20.61	New
Majority		15,570	24.99	−2.55
Turnout		62,310	80.07	
Conservative hold		Swing		

General election October 1974: Crosby
Party	Candidate	Votes	%	±%
Conservative	Graham Page	29,764	51.51	−0.68
Labour	Margaret Hignett	17,589	30.44	+3.24
Liberal	Anthony Hill	10,429	18.05	−2.56
Majority		12,175	21.07	−3.92
Turnout		57,782	73.51	−6.56
Conservative hold		Swing		

General election 1979: Crosby
Party	Candidate	Votes	%	±%
Conservative	Graham Page	34,768	56.95	+5.44
Labour	Tony Mulhearn	15,496	25.38	−5.06
Liberal	Anthony Hill	9,302	15.24	−2.81
Ecology	Peter Hussey	1,489	2.44	+2.44
Majority		19,272	31.56	+10.49
Turnout		61,055	75.18	+1.67
Conservative hold		Swing		

=== Elections in the 1980s ===
1981 Crosby by-election
Party	Candidate	Votes	%	±%
SDP	Shirley Williams	28,118	49.07	+33.83
Conservative	John Butcher	22,829	39.84	−17.11
Labour	John Backhouse	5,450	9.51	−15.87
Ecology	Richard Small	480	0.83	−1.61
Raving Loony	Tarquin Biscuitbarrel	223	0.39	New
Independent	Tom Keen	99	0.17	New
Democratic Monarchist, Public Safety, White Resident	Bill Boaks	36	0.06	New
Independent	John Kennedy	31	0.05	New
Independent	Donald Potter	31	0.05	New
Majority		5,289	9.23	N/A
Turnout		57,297	69.3	−5.9
SDP gain from Conservative		Swing		

General election 1983: Crosby
Party	Candidate	Votes	%	±%
Conservative	Malcolm Thornton	30,604	47.2	
SDP	Shirley Williams	27,203	42.0	
Labour	Robert Waring	6,611	10.2	
Ecology	Peter Hussey	415	0.6	
Majority		3,401	5.2	N/A
Turnout		64,833	77.9	
Conservative gain from SDP		Swing		

General election 1987: Crosby
Party	Candidate	Votes	%	±%
Conservative	Malcolm Thornton	30,836	46.2	−1.0
SDP	Anthony Donovan	23,989	35.9	−6.1
Labour	Christopher Cheetham	11,992	18.0	+7.8
Majority		6,847	10.3	+5.1
Turnout		66,817	79.6	+1.7
Conservative hold		Swing		

=== Elections in the 1990s ===
General election 1992: Crosby
Party	Candidate	Votes	%	±%
Conservative	Malcolm Thornton	32,267	47.4	+1.2
Labour	Maria Eagle	17,461	25.7	+7.7
Liberal Democrats	Flo Clucas	16,562	24.3	−11.6
Liberal	John Marks	1,052	1.5	N/A
Green	Sean Brady	559	0.8	New
Natural Law	N.L. Paterson	152	0.2	New
Majority		14,806	21.7	+11.4
Turnout		68,053	82.5	+2.9
Conservative hold		Swing	−3.2	

General election 1997: Crosby
Party	Candidate	Votes	%	±%
Labour	Claire Curtis-Thomas	22,549	51.1	+22.3
Conservative	Malcolm Thornton	15,367	34.8	−13.9
Liberal Democrats	Paul McVey	5,080	11.5	−8.5
Referendum	John Gauld	813	1.8	New
Liberal	John Marks	233	0.5	−1.0
Natural Law	William Hite	99	0.2	0.0
Majority		7,182	16.3	N/A
Turnout		44,141	77.2	
Labour gain from Conservative		Swing	+18.1	

=== Elections in the 2000s ===
General election 2001: Crosby
Party	Candidate	Votes	%	±%
Labour	Claire Curtis-Thomas	20,327	55.1	+4.0
Conservative	Robert Collinson	11,974	32.5	−2.3
Liberal Democrats	Tim Drake	4,084	11.1	−0.4
Socialist Labour	Mark Holt	481	1.3	New
Majority		8,353	22.6	+6.3
Turnout		36,866	65.1	−12.1
Labour hold		Swing	+3.2	

General election 2005: Crosby
Party	Candidate	Votes	%	±%
Labour	Claire Curtis-Thomas	17,463	48.2	−6.9
Conservative	Debi Jones	11,623	32.1	−0.4
Liberal Democrats	Jim Murray	6,298	17.4	+6.3
UKIP	John Whittaker	454	1.3	New
Communist	Geoffrey Bottoms	199	0.5	New
Clause 28 Children's Protection Christian Democrats	David Braid	157	0.4	New
Majority		5,840	16.1	−6.5
Turnout		36,194	66.7	+1.6
Labour hold		Swing	−3.2	

== See also ==
- List of parliamentary constituencies in Merseyside
