= 1894 Liverpool School Board election =

Local election in Liverpool, England

Elections to the Liverpool School Board were held on Saturday 17 November 1894.

There were twenty-two candidates for the fifteen Board member positions.

Each voter had fifteen votes to cast.

After the election, the composition of the School Board was:

Allegiance	Members	±	Votes
Church of England	6	+1	281,142
Catholic	6	0	140,620
Progressive	2	+2	87,944
Wesleyan	1	0	25,766
Labour	0		11,190
Independent	0		4,517
Socialist	0		2,906
Total Votes cast			554,085
Electorate			76,303
Turnout			48%

* - Retiring board member seeking re-election

Elected

Allegiance	Name	Votes
Church of England	Rev. W.J. Adams	67,301
Church of England	Lieut-Col. G. H. Morrison J.P.	52,061
Church of England	Rev. F.R. Tyrer MA	46,435
Church of England	Rev. Canon Dyson Rycroft *	44,758
Church of England	Rev. Canon Major Lester *	41,959
Catholic	Michael Fitzpatrick *	30,517
Progressive	Miss Anne Jane Davies *	24,321
Catholic	Charles McArdle *	28,427
Wesleyan	William Culton J.P.	25,766
Catholic	W.J. Sparrow *	28,628
Catholic	Richard Yates *	27,195
Catholic	Augustine Watts MA	27,097
Church of England	Wm. F. Blaxter MA	36,201
Catholic	John Hand *	27,183
Progressive	T.C. Ryley *	18,232

Not Elected

Progressive	W. Dent-Dent MA J.P.	15,242
Independenr	Robert F. Finlay	2,290
Socialist	Joseph Goodman	2,906
Independent	Gustav Morris	2,227
Progressive	W.C. Rawlins C.E.	14,724
Labour	Samuel Reeves	11,190
Progressive	William Rowlandson C.E.	15,425
