= Graham Page =

British politician (1911–1981)

Sir Graham Page MBE PC

Minister of State for Housing and Local Government
- In office October 1970 – 28 February 1974
- Prime Minister: Edward Heath
- Succeeded by: John Silkin (Minister of State for Local Government and Planning)

Minister of State for Local Government and Development
- In office June 1970 – October 1970
- Prime Minister: Edward Heath
- Succeeded by: Self (as Minister of State for Housing and Local Government)

Member of Parliament for Crosby
- In office 12 November 1953 – 1 October 1981
- Preceded by: Malcolm Bullock
- Succeeded by: Shirley Williams

Personal details
- Born: Rodney Graham Page; 30 June 1911 Hertford, England
- Died: 1 October 1981 (aged 70) London, England
- Party: Conservative
- Spouse: Hilda (m. 1934)
- Children: 2
- Education: University of London (LL.B.)
- Profession: Solicitor; business director

Military service
- Allegiance: United Kingdom
- Unit: Royal Air Force Volunteer Reserve
- Battles/wars: World War II

Sir Rodney Graham Page PC, MBE (30 June 1911 – 1 October 1981) was a British solicitor, businessman and Conservative Party politician who was the Member of Parliament for Crosby from 1953 until his death.

== Background ==
Page was born in Hertford to Frank Page, a lieutenant colonel, and Margaret Page (née Farley). He was educated at Magdalen College School, Oxford, and the University of London, where he received an external bachelor of laws (LL.B.) degree, and then became a solicitor. During World War II, he was a flight lieutenant within the Royal Air Force Volunteer Reserve. He was named an MBE in 1944. Page was a Privy Council appeal agent and a company and building society director.

== Political career ==
Page was the unsuccessful Conservative candidate for Islington North in 1950 and 1951. He was elected an MP at a by-election in 1953, for Crosby.

As an MP, he chaired the Select committee on Statutory Instruments from 1964 to 1966. He was appointed a Privy Counsellor in 1972. Page was the Minister of State for Local Government and Development from June to October 1970, and then became the Minister of State for Housing and Local Government in the Department of the Environment from then until the Conservative Government lost the February 1974 general election. He took a particular interest in government administration and played a significant part in the reorganisation of local government and water authorities in the early 1970s.

Page won his last general election victory at the 1979 general election, with majority of over 19,000 votes, and was knighted the following year. He intended to stand down in the following general election, but he died in office before then.

With W. J. Leaper, Page wrote a book called Rent Act 1965 in 1966. He corresponded with Winston Churchill and Enoch Powell. He was a governor of St. Thomas's Hospital, London, and a treasurer of the Pedestrians' Association.

== Personal life and death ==
Page married his wife, Hilda, in 1934, and they had two children. He died from a heart attack in London on 1 October 1981, at the age of 70. In the subsequent by-election for Crosby, the seat was won by former Labour minister Shirley Williams, who became the first person elected to Parliament as a member of the Social Democratic Party.

Parliament of the United Kingdom
Preceded by Malcolm Bullock	Member of Parliament for Crosby; 1953–1981	Succeeded by Shirley Williams
