= 1900 Liverpool School Board election =

Local election in Liverpool, England

Elections to the Liverpool School Board were held on Friday 16 November 1900. These were held every three years, when all fifteen board members were elected. There were nineteen candidates for the fifteen board member positions.

Each voter had fifteen votes to cast.

After the elections, the composition of the school board was:

| Allegiance | Members | ± | Votes |
|---|---|---|---|
| Church of England | 6 | -2 | 174,523 |
| Catholic | 4 | 0 | 199,688 |
| Non-Sectarian | 4 | 0 | 133,603 |
| Protestant | 1 | 0 | 107,063 |
| Labour | 0 | | 20,690 |
| Independent Church of England | 0 | | 18,735 |
| Independent Non-Sectarian | 0 | | 10,967 |
| Total Votes cast | | | 665,269 |
| Electorate | | | 105,201 |
| Turnout | | | 42% |

* - Retiring board member seeking re-election

Elected

| Allegiance | Name | Votes |
|---|---|---|
| Protestant | George Wise | 107,063 |
| Non-sectarian | Miss Melly * | 52,909 |
| Catholic | Michael Fitzpatrick * | 50,458 |
| Catholic | Dr. Sparrow * | 50,280 |
| Catholic | J. R. Yates | 49,809 |
| Catholic | C. McArdle * | 49,141 |
| Non-sectarian | J. C Stitt | 45,280 |
| Non-sectarian | W. Evans * | 39,847 |
| Church of England | Rev. Canon Lester * | 36,427 |
| Non-sectarian | R. G. Hough * | 35,414 |
| Church of England | J. H. Goodyear * | 34,044 |
| Church of England | Rev. W. J. Adams | 33,275 |
| Church of England | Dr. H. A. Clarke | 32,801 |
| Church of England | J. L. Bailey | 29,124 |
| Church of England | Rev. Geo. Howell * | 24,309 |

Not Elected

| Church of England | N. Bewley * | 20,970 |
| Labour | Samuel Reeves | 20,690 |
| Independent Church of England | Rev. J. Bell-Cox * | 18,735 |
| Independent Non-Sectarian | T. C. Ryley * | 10,967 |
