= Shirley Williams =

British politician and academic (1930–2021)

The Right Honourable The Baroness Williams of Crosby CH PC
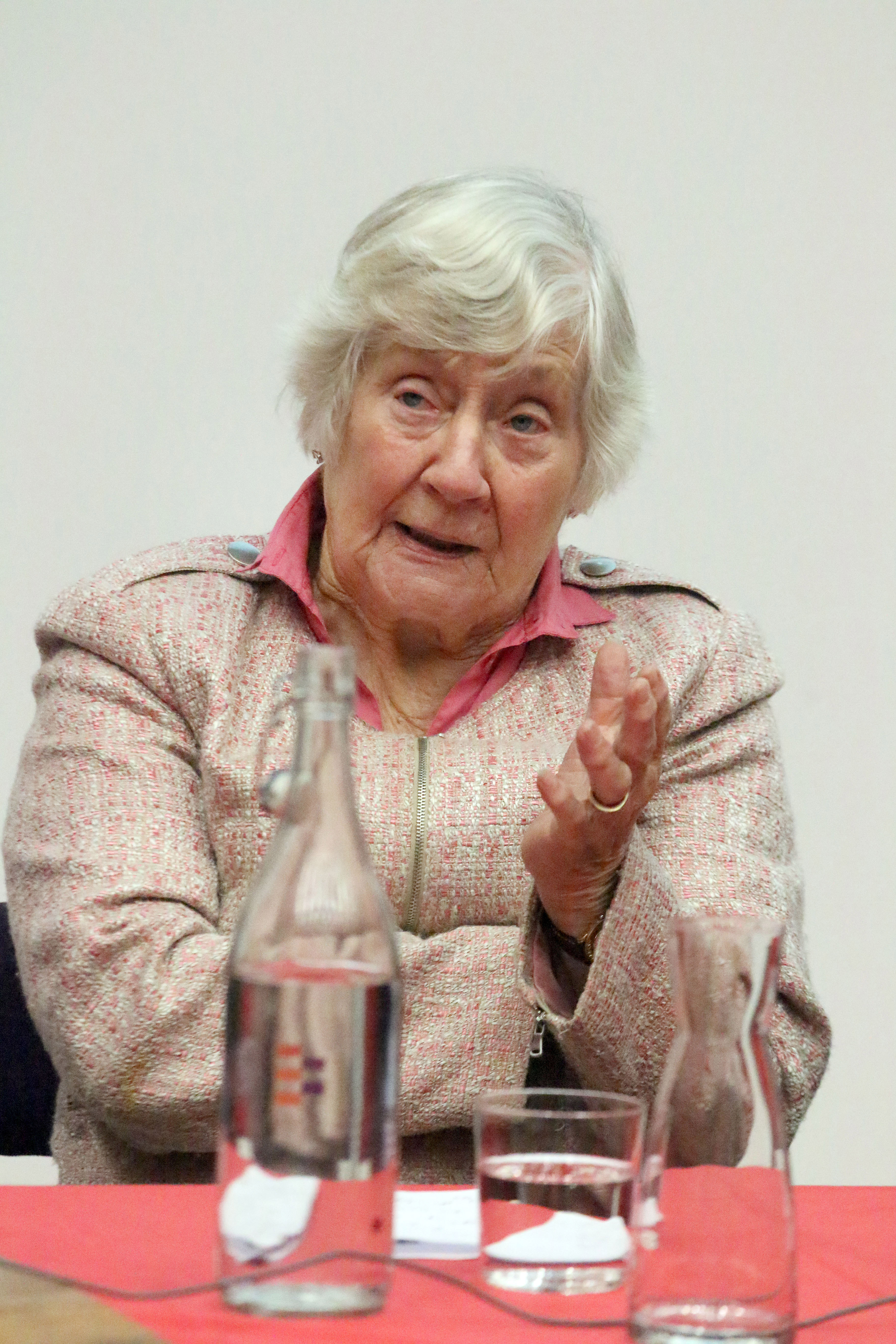
- Williams in 2014

Leader of the Liberal Democrats in the House of Lords
- In office 7 June 2001 – 24 November 2004
- Leader: Charles Kennedy
- Preceded by: The Lord Rodgers of Quarry Bank
- Succeeded by: The Lord McNally

President of the Social Democratic Party
- In office 7 July 1982 – 29 August 1987
- Leader: Roy Jenkins; David Owen
- Preceded by: Office established
- Succeeded by: John Cartwright

Secretary of State for Education and Science
- In office 10 September 1976 – 4 May 1979
- Prime Minister: James Callaghan
- Preceded by: Fred Mulley
- Succeeded by: Mark Carlisle

Paymaster General
- In office 10 September 1976 – 4 May 1979
- Prime Minister: James Callaghan
- Preceded by: Edmund Dell
- Succeeded by: Angus Maude

Secretary of State for Prices and Consumer Protection
- In office 5 March 1974 – 10 September 1976
- Prime Minister: Harold Wilson; James Callaghan
- Preceded by: Peter Walker (as Trade and Industry Secretary)
- Succeeded by: Roy Hattersley
Junior ministerial offices
Minister of State for Home Affairs
In office 13 October 1969 – 23 June 1970
Prime Minister	Harold Wilson
Preceded by	The Lord Stonham
Succeeded by	Richard Sharples
Minister of State for Education and Science
In office 29 August 1967 – 13 October 1969
Prime Minister	Harold Wilson
Preceded by	Goronwy Roberts
Succeeded by	Alice Bacon
Shadow cabinet offices
Shadow Secretary of State for Prices and Consumer Protection
In office 4 May 1973 – 5 March 1974
Leader	Harold Wilson
Preceded by	Office established
Succeeded by	Sally Oppenheim-Barnes
Shadow Home Secretary
In office 19 October 1971 – 4 May 1973
Leader	Harold Wilson
Preceded by	James Callaghan
Succeeded by	Roy Jenkins
Shadow Secretary of State for Health and Social Services
In office 19 June 1970 – 19 October 1971
Leader	Harold Wilson
Preceded by	Richard Crossman
Succeeded by	Barbara Castle
Parliamentary offices
Member of the House of Lords
Lord Temporal
Life peerage 1 February 1993 – 11 February 2016
Member of Parliament for Crosby
In office 26 November 1981 – 13 May 1983
Preceded by	Graham Page
Succeeded by	Malcolm Thornton
Member of Parliament for Hertford and Stevenage
In office 28 February 1974 – 7 April 1979
Preceded by	Constituency established
Succeeded by	Bowen Wells
Member of Parliament for Hitchin
In office 15 October 1964 – 8 February 1974
Preceded by	Martin Maddan
Succeeded by	Ian Stewart

Personal details
- Born: Shirley Vivian Teresa Brittain Catlin; 27 July 1930 Chelsea, London, England
- Died: 12 April 2021 (aged 90)
- Party: Labour (before 1981); SDP (1981–1988); Liberal Democrats (from 1988)
- Spouses: Bernard Williams (m. 1955; div. 1974) Richard Neustadt (m. 1987; died 2003)
- Children: 1
- Parents: Sir George Catlin (father); Vera Brittain (mother)

Academic background
- Education: Somerville College, Oxford; Columbia University

Academic work
- Institutions: Harvard Kennedy School
- Main interests: Electoral politics

Shirley Vivian Teresa Brittain Williams, Baroness Williams of Crosby (née Catlin; 27 July 1930 – 12 April 2021) was a British politician and academic. Originally a Labour Party Member of Parliament (MP), she served in the Labour cabinet from 1974 to 1979. She was one of the "Gang of Four" rebels who founded the Social Democratic Party (SDP) in 1981 and, at the time of her retirement from politics, was a Liberal Democrat.

Williams was elected to the House of Commons for Hitchin in the 1964 general election. She served as minister for Education and Science from 1967 to 1969 and Minister of State for Home Affairs from 1969 to 1970. She served as Shadow Home Secretary from 1971 and 1973. In 1974, she became Secretary of State for Prices and Consumer Protection in Harold Wilson's cabinet. When Wilson was succeeded by James Callaghan, she served as Secretary of State for Education and Science and Paymaster General from 1976 to 1979. She lost her seat to the Conservative Party at the 1979 general election.

In 1981, dismayed with the Labour Party's left-ward movement under Michael Foot, she was one of the "Gang of Four"—centrist Labour figures who formed the SDP. Williams won the 1981 Crosby by-election and became the first SDP member elected to Parliament, but she lost the seat in the 1983 general election. She served as President of the SDP from 1982 to 1987 and supported the SDP's merger with the Liberal Party that formed the Liberal Democrats.

Between 2001 and 2004, she served as Leader of the Liberal Democrats in the House of Lords and, from 2007 to 2010, as Adviser on Nuclear Proliferation to Prime Minister Gordon Brown. She remained an active member of the House of Lords until announcing her retirement in January 2016, and was a Professor Emerita of Electoral Politics at Harvard Kennedy School at the time of her death at age 90, having been one of the last surviving members of the Labour governments of the 1970s.

== Early life and education ==
Born on 27 July 1930 at 19 Glebe Place, Chelsea, London, Williams was the daughter of the political scientist and philosopher Sir George Catlin and the pacifist writer Vera Brittain. Williams's grandmother, Brittain's mother, was born in Aberystwyth, Wales. She was educated at various schools, including Mrs Spencer's School in Brechin Place, South Kensington; Christchurch Elementary School in Chelsea; Talbot Heath School in Bournemouth; and St Paul's Girls' School in London. During the Second World War, from 1940 to 1943, she was evacuated to St. Paul, Minnesota, in the United States, where she attended the all-girls' Summit School.

While she was an undergraduate and an Open Scholar at Somerville College, Oxford, Williams was a member of the Oxford University Dramatic Society (OUDS) and toured the United States playing the role of Cordelia in an OUDS production of Shakespeare's King Lear directed by a young Tony Richardson. In 1950, she became chair of the Oxford University Labour Club, believing herself to be the first woman to hold the position though it has been shown that Betty Tate had chaired a session in 1934. After graduating as a Bachelor of Arts in philosophy, politics and economics, Williams was awarded a Fulbright Scholarship and studied American trade unionism at Columbia University in New York City for a master's degree, awarded by Oxford in 1954.

On returning to Britain, she began her career as a journalist, working firstly for the Daily Mirror and then for the Financial Times. In 1960, she became General Secretary of the Fabian Society, a role she held until 1964.

== Parliamentary career ==
After unsuccessfully contesting the constituency of Harwich at the 1954 by-election and the general election the following year, as well as the constituency of Southampton Test at the 1959 general election, Williams was elected in the 1964 general election as Labour MP for the constituency of Hitchin in Hertfordshire. She retained the seat, renamed Hertford and Stevenage after boundary changes in 1974, until 1979. As Minister for Education and Science (August 1967 – October 1969), Williams launched the first Women in Engineering Year in 1969.

Her colleague David Owen recalled: "You'd watch her work a room at a local Labour event and she'd never start by smarming up to a regional leader or a councillor. She'd settle down next to somebody whom she'd have no political reason to talk to – a solid party worker – and you'd watch this person's face light up. This was always done spontaneously, without any ulterior motives. She just liked people and liked them to like her."

Between 1971 and 1973, she served as Shadow Home Secretary. In 1974, she became Secretary of State for Prices and Consumer Protection in Harold Wilson's cabinet. When Wilson announced his resignation in 1976 and was succeeded by James Callaghan, she became Secretary of State for Education and Paymaster General, holding both cabinet positions at the same time. Williams stood for the Labour deputy leadership in October of that year but lost to Michael Foot.

=== Comprehensive schools ===
While serving as education secretary between 1976 and 1979, Williams pursued the policy introduced by Anthony Crosland in 1965 to introduce the comprehensive school system in place of grammar schools. Previously, in 1972, as her daughter Rebecca approached secondary school age, Williams had moved into the catchment area of the voluntary aided school Godolphin and Latymer School allowing her daughter to gain a place there. However, when Godolphin and Latymer School subsequently voted to go independent in 1977, Rebecca chose to leave that school and instead went to Camden School for Girls because it had chosen to go comprehensive.

=== Europeanism ===
Always a passionately committed supporter of European integration, Williams was one of 68 Labour MPs to defy a three-line whip in the 28 October 1971 Commons vote on membership of the European Communities. Four years later, she was one of the leaders of the Britain in Europe campaign during the 1975 European Communities membership referendum. Labour's anti-Europeanism during the Michael Foot years was one of the factors that drove her to abandon the party in 1981.

In her 2016 valedictory speech to the House of Lords before that year's second membership referendum, she described the UK's European Union (EU) membership as "the most central political question that this country has to answer" and said it was the reason for her retirement. In closing, she called on her colleagues to "think very hard before allowing the United Kingdom to withdraw from ... its major duty to the world—the one it will encounter, and then deliver, through the European Union".

=== Social issues ===
A lifelong Roman Catholic, Williams was a longstanding opponent of the legalisation of abortion. She was one of the two female MPs to vote against the Abortion Act 1967, which legalised abortion. However, Lord Harries of Pentregarth reported that Williams "refused to sign up for the Society for the Protection of Unborn Children (SPUC), and generally kept a low profile on the issue of abortion."

On Thursday 21 June 2007 she appeared on Question Time to discuss Salman Rushdie being honoured. She was strongly opposed to the action.

== Social Democratic Party ==
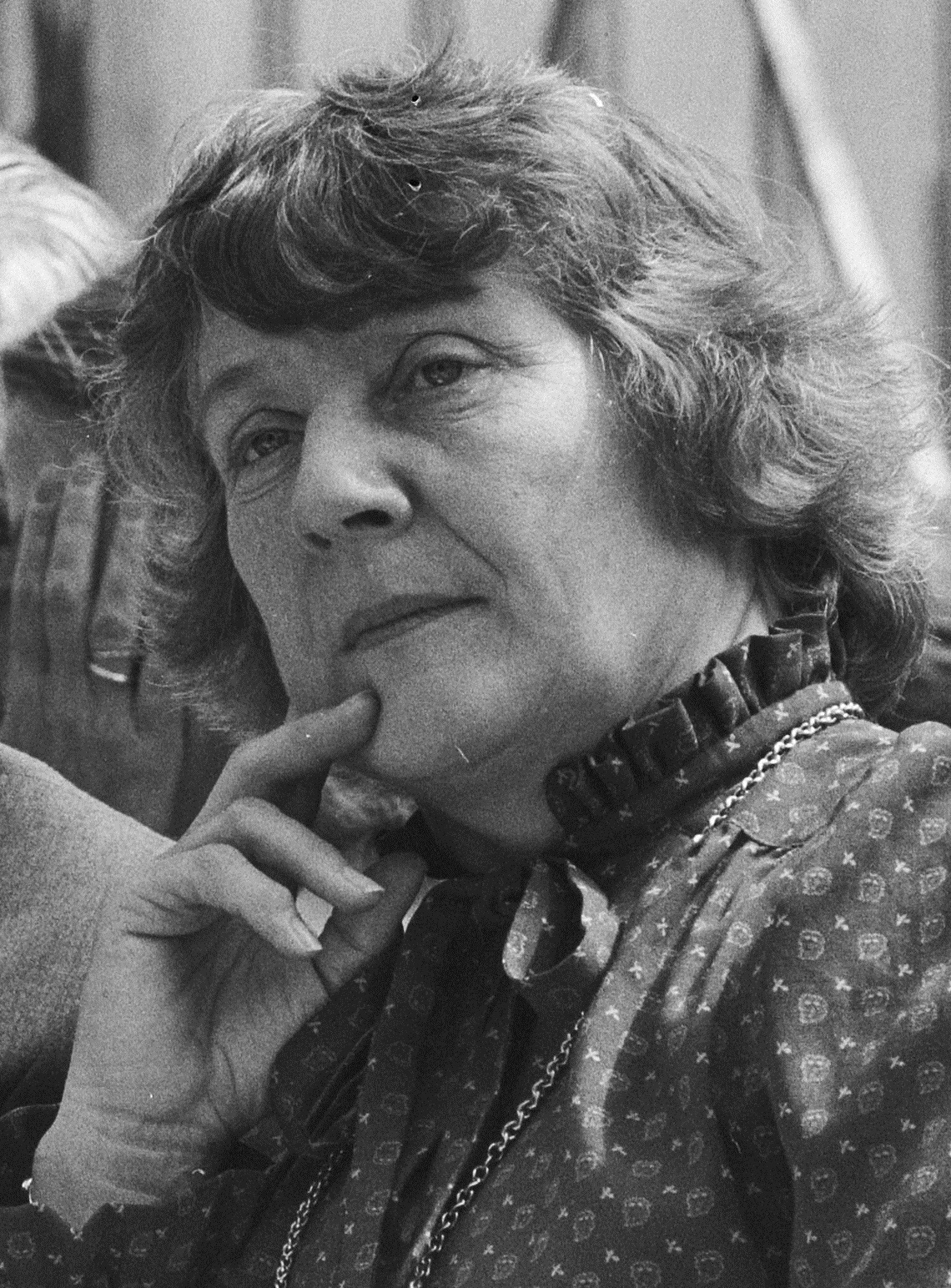
Williams in 1984

Williams lost her seat (renamed Hertford and Stevenage) when the Labour Party was defeated at the 1979 general election. Her defeat came two years after her appearance and arrest on the Grunwick picket lines, for which she had been harshly criticised in the press. When, soon afterward, she was interviewed by Robin Day for the BBC's Decision 79 television coverage of the election results, both Norman St John-Stevas – the Conservative's Education Spokesman who had frequently clashed with her at the despatch box – and Merlyn Rees, the outgoing Home Secretary, paid tribute to her.

Following the election, she hosted the BBC1 TV series Shirley Williams in Conversation, interviewing, in turn, a number of political figures, including former West German chancellor Willy Brandt, former Conservative prime minister Edward Heath and her recently deposed colleague James Callaghan. She later appeared on many television and radio discussion programmes in Britain – in particular, the BBC's Question Time, where her 58 appearances earned her a "Most Frequent Panellist" award. During this period, Williams remained a member of the National Executive of the Labour Party. From 1980 to 1981, she was Chairman of the Fabian Society.

In 1981, unhappy with the influence of the more left-wing members of the Labour Party, she resigned her membership to form – along with fellow Labour resignees Roy Jenkins, David Owen and Bill Rodgers – the Social Democratic Party (SDP). They were joined by 28 other Labour MPs and one Conservative. Later that year, following the death of the Conservative MP Sir Graham Page, she won the Crosby by-election and became the first SDP member elected to Parliament. Two years later, however, having become the SDP's President, she lost the seat at the 1983 general election. At the 1987 general election, Williams stood for the SDP in Cambridge, but lost to the sitting Conservative candidate Robert Rhodes James. She then supported the SDP's merger with the Liberal Party that formed the Liberal Democrats.

== Harvard University ==
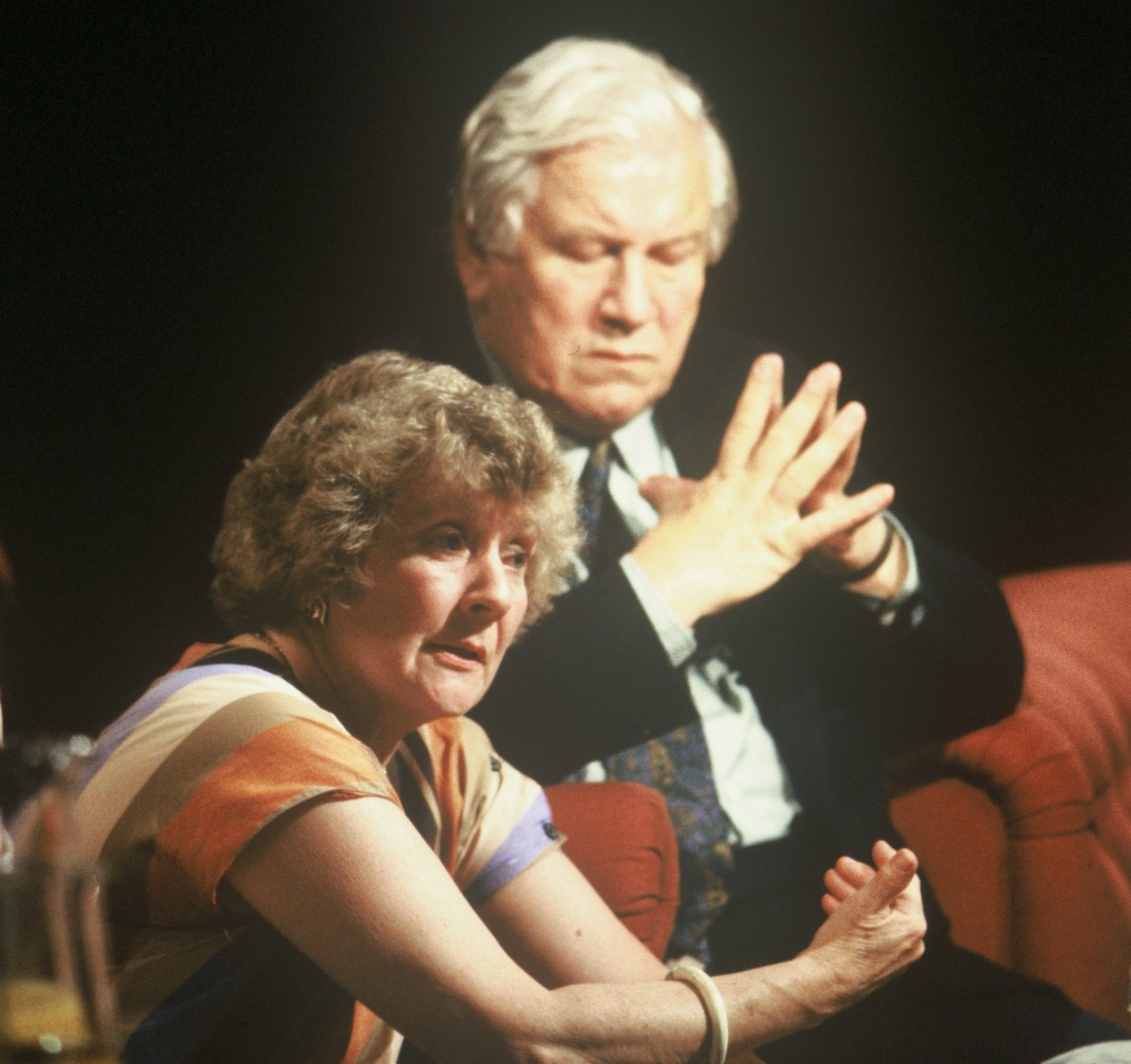
Sitting beside Peter Ustinov during an episode of the late-night TV discussion programme After Dark, 1989

In 1988, Williams moved to the United States to serve as a professor at Harvard Kennedy School, remaining until 2001, and thereafter as Public Service Professor of Electoral Politics, Emerita. Nonetheless, she remained active in politics and public service in Britain, the United States and internationally. During these years, Williams helped draft constitutions in Russia, Ukraine, and South Africa. She also served as director of Harvard's Project Liberty, an initiative designed to assist the emerging democracies in Central and Eastern Europe; and as a board member and acting director of Harvard's Institute of Politics (IOP). Upon her elevation to the House of Lords in 1993, she returned to the United Kingdom.

== Life peer ==
Williams was made a life peer on 1 February 1993, as Baroness Williams of Crosby, of Stevenage in the County of Hertfordshire, and subsequently served as Leader of the Liberal Democrats in the House of Lords from 2001 to 2004.

Among other non-profit boards, Williams was a member of the Council on Foreign Relations, the EU's Comité des Sages (Reflection Group) on Social Policy, the Twentieth Century Fund, the Ditchley Foundation, the Institute for Public Policy Research, and the Nuclear Threat Initiative. She also served as President of the Royal Institute of International Affairs, as Commissioner of the International Commission on Nuclear Non-proliferation and Disarmament and as president of the Cambridge University Liberal Association. Williams was also an attendee of the 2013 and the 2010 Bilderberg conferences in Watford, Hertfordshire, England, and Sitges, Spain, respectively.

In June 2007, after Gordon Brown replaced Tony Blair as Prime Minister, Williams accepted a formal Government position as Advisor on Nuclear Proliferation provided she could serve as an independent advisor; she remained a Liberal Democrat. Her interest and commitment to education continued, and she served as Chair of Judges of the British Teaching Awards. Williams was a member of the Top Level Group of UK Parliamentarians for Multilateral Nuclear Disarmament and Non-proliferation, established in October 2009.

Williams was originally opposed to the Cameron–Clegg coalition's Health and Social Care Bill, describing it as "stealth privatisation" during 2011. The government made some changes to the Bill, described by Williams as "major concessions", but dismissed as "minor" by Guardian commentator Polly Toynbee. Williams urged Liberal Democrats to support the amended Bill during the conference in March 2012, saying "I would not have stuck with the bill, if I believed for one moment it would undermine the NHS."

Williams spoke against same-sex marriage in the House of Lords, saying that "equality is not the same as sameness. That is the fundamental mistake in this Bill" and that women and men "complement one another", arguing that marriage between people of the same sex should not be called marriage but should have "different nomenclature". This was based on her belief that marriage is "a framework for procreation and the raising of children." In late 2015, she announced her intention to retire from the House of Lords. On 28 January 2016 she made her valedictory speech in the chamber, and on 11 February she officially retired, in pursuance of Section 1 of the House of Lords Reform Act 2014. In the 2017 New Year Honours, Williams was appointed to the Order of the Companions of Honour for "services to political and public life".

== Personal life ==
Williams married twice. At Oxford she met Peter Parker (the future head of British Rail) and they had a relationship. In her autobiography (Climbing the Bookshelves) Williams said that "...by the spring of 1949 I was in love with him, and he, a little, with me...". In 1955, she married the moral philosopher Bernard Williams. Bernard left Oxford to accommodate his wife's rising political ambitions, finding a post first at University College London (1959–64) and then as Professor of Philosophy at Bedford College, London (1964–67), while she worked as a journalist for the Financial Times and as Secretary of the Fabian Society. The marriage was dissolved in 1974; Bernard Williams subsequently married Patricia Skinner and had two sons with her. Shirley said of her marriage to Bernard:

... [T]here was something of a strain that comes from two things. One is that we were both too caught up in what we were respectively doing — we didn't spend all that much time together; the other, to be completely honest, is that I'm fairly unjudgmental and I found Bernard's capacity for pretty sharp putting-down of people he thought were stupid unacceptable. Patricia has been cleverer than me in that respect. She just rides it. He can be very painful sometimes. He can eviscerate somebody. Those who are left behind are, as it were, dead personalities. Judge not that ye be not judged. I was influenced by Christian thinking, and he would say "That's frightfully pompous and it's not really the point." So we had a certain jarring over that and over Catholicism.

Her first marriage was annulled in 1980. In 1987 she married the Harvard professor and presidential historian Richard Neustadt, who died in 2003.

She had a daughter with Bernard Williams, a stepdaughter, and two grandchildren. Her daughter, Rebecca, became a lawyer. She was a longtime resident of Hertfordshire, living in Furneux Pelham after she was elected MP for Hitchin, and moving to Little Hadham, Hertfordshire later in life, before spending the final year of her life in a care home.

Williams was a Roman Catholic and, from 2009, attended church every Sunday. In Who's Who, she listed her recreations as "music, poetry, hill walking".

Williams died on 12 April 2021, at the age of 90. Liberal Democrat leader Ed Davey called Williams a "Liberal lion and a true trailblazer" and stated that "political life will be poorer without her intellect, her wisdom and her generosity".

== Honours ==
Williams was made an Honorary Fellow of her alma mater, Somerville College, Oxford, in 1970, and of Newnham College, Cambridge, in 1977. Williams received a number of honorary doctorates:

- Honorary DEd (Doctor of Education), Council for National Academic Awards, 1969
- Honorary DLitt (Doctor of Letters), Heriot-Watt University,1980
- Hon. LLD (Doctor of Laws), University of Sheffield, 1980; University of Southampton, 1981; University of Liverpool, 2008; University of Cambridge, 2009
- Honorary Doctor of Politics and Economics, University of Leuven, 1976; Radcliffe College, Harvard, 1978; University of Leeds, 1980; University of Bath, 1980
- Honorary DSc (Doctor of Science), Aston University, 1981
- Honorary Doctor, Monterey Institute, California, 2006

== Works by and about ==
Shirley Williams wrote several books, including:

- Climbing the Bookshelves: The Autobiography of Shirley Williams, Virago Press (2009). ISBN 9781844084753.
- God and Caesar: Personal Reflections on Politics and Religion, University of Notre Dame Press (2003). ISBN 9780268010461.
- Ambition and Beyond: Career Paths of American Politicians, with Edward L. Lascher Jr, Institute of Governmental Studies Press, University of California, Berkeley (1993). ISBN 9780877723387.
- New Party – The New Technology Social and Liberal Democrats by Hebden Royd, (1988). ISBN 9781851870752.
- Politics is for People Harvard University Press, (1981). ISBN 9780140058888.

Her biography was published in 2013: Shirley Williams: The Biography, Mark Peel (Biteback Publishing)

For details of Williams's early life see:

- Vera Brittain: A Life by Paul Berry and Mark Bostridge (1995).
- Testament of Experience by Vera Brittain (1957).

There is a substantial article on Shirley Williams by Phillip Whitehead in the Dictionary of Labour Biography, edited by Greg Rosen, Politico's Publishing, 2001, and one by Dick Newby in the Dictionary of Liberal Biography, edited by Duncan Brack, Politico's Publishing, 1998.

See also:

- John Campbell (2014). Roy Jenkins, a Well-Rounded Life. Jonathan Cape. ISBN 978-0-224-08750-6.

Williams was a main character in Steve Waters' 2017 play Limehouse, which premiered at the Donmar Warehouse; she was portrayed by Debra Gillett.

== Arms ==
Coat of arms of Shirley Williams
Coronet A Coronet of a Baroness Escutcheon Per chevron Azure and Or three Lions passant guardant in pale counterchanged a Bordure engrailed Ermine Motto Quamdiu (Until)

== Notes and references ==
Party political offices
Preceded by Bill Rodgers	General Secretary of the Fabian Society; 1960–1963	Succeeded by Thomas Ponsonby
Preceded by Peter Archer	Chair of the Fabian Society; 1980–1981	Succeeded by David Lipsey
New office	President of the Social Democratic Party; 1982–1987	Succeeded by John Cartwright
Preceded by The Lord Rodgers of Quarry Bank	Leader of the Liberal Democrats in the House of Lords; 2001–2004	Succeeded by The Lord McNally
Parliament of the United Kingdom
Preceded by Martin Maddan	Member of Parliament for Hitchin; 1964–1974	Succeeded by Ian Stewart
New constituency	Member of Parliament for Hertford and Stevenage; 1974–1979	Succeeded by Bowen Wells
Preceded by Graham Page	Member of Parliament for Crosby; 1981–1983	Succeeded by Malcolm Thornton
Political offices
Preceded by Richard Crossman	Shadow Secretary of State for Health and Social Services; 1970–1971	Succeeded by Barbara Castle
Preceded by James Callaghan	Shadow Home Secretary; 1971–1973	Succeeded by Roy Jenkins
New office	Shadow Secretary of State for Prices and Consumer Protection; 1971–1973	Succeeded by Sally Oppenheim-Barnes
New office	Secretary of State for Prices and Consumer Protection; 1974–1976	Succeeded by Roy Hattersley
Preceded by Fred Mulley	Secretary of State for Education and Science; 1976–1979	Succeeded by Mark Carlisle
Preceded by Edmund Dell	Paymaster General; 1976–1979	Succeeded by Angus Maude
