= 1953 Crosby by-election =

UK Parliamentary by-election

The 1953 Crosby by-election was held on 12 November 1953. It was held due to the incumbent Conservative MP, Malcolm Bullock resigning his seat. The by-election was won by the Conservative candidate Graham Page.

Crosby by-election 12 November 1953
Party	Candidate	Votes	%	±%
Conservative	Graham Page	18,614	68.09	−2.86
Labour	E.J. Adams	7,545	27.60	−1.45
Ind. Conservative	J.A. Freeman	1,180	4.32	New
Majority		11,069	40.49	−1.41
Turnout		27,339		
Conservative hold		Swing		
