= 1873 Liverpool School Board election =

Local election in Liverpool, England

Elections to the Liverpool School Board were held on 19 November 1873.

There were thirty-two candidates for the fifteen Board positions.

After the election, the composition of the school board was:

Allegiance	Members	Percentage	Votes	Percentage
Catholic	5	33%	138,763	40%
Protestant	5	33%	88,939	25%
Liberal Protestant	2	13%	48,434	14%
none	1	6.5%	20,133	6.5%
Wesleyan	1			
Church of England	1			
Total	15		349,191	

Elected

Allegiance	Name	Votes	Occupation	Address
Catholic	Edward Browne	29,392	Corn merchant	7 Olive Mount Villas, Olive Mount
Catholic	John Yates	27,780	Attorney-at-law	Haslington House, Oak-hill Park, West Derby
Catholic	James Whitty	27,703		155 Upper Parliament Street
Catholic	James Fairhurst	27,550	Gentleman	97 Shaw Street, Everton
Catholic	Joseph Walton	26,338	Barrister-at-law	116 Canning Street
Protestant	Henry Carpenter	23,177	Clerk in holy orders	15 Huntly Road
	William Oulton	20,133	shipowner and railway sack contractor	68 Sefton Terrace, Princes Road
Protestant	William Cross	17,138	Physician	29 Islington
Protestant	Rev. Richard Hughes	16,900	Clerk in holy orders	28 Marmaduke Street
Protestant	James Hakes	16,729	surgeon	30 Hope Street
Protestant	Thomas Henry Satchell	14,985	Hatter	Heathfield, Village Road, Oxton
Liberal Protestant	Samuel G. Rathbone JP	12,328	merchant	Yew Tree House, Allerton
Wesleyan	John Bamford Burrows LRCP	10,384	Doctor of Medicine	Ivy House, Aigburth Road
Liberal Protestant	Samuel Booth	9,825	Accountant	20 Caledonia Street
Church of England	Abraham Hume	9,740	Clerk in holy orders	6 Rupert Lane, Everton

Not Elected

Liberal Protestant	Robert Trimble J.P.	9,397	
Liberal Protestant	William Dawbarn	8,850	
Liberal Protestant	Thomas Pritchard	8,034	
	Edward Jones	7,395	35 Newstead Road
Church of England	Gustav Henry Busch	6,983	
	William Shortis	2,807	
	Robert Thomas Lodge	2,647	
	Lewis Williams	2,346	
	Owen Williams	2,148	
	William Shaw Simpson	2,096	
	William Nash	1,389	
	Joseph Shepherd	1,385	29 Everton Crescent
	David Harbridge Ellis	974	
	John Neale Lomax	899	
	George Carr	758	
	Christopher Wardall	740	
	Charles James Fox	241	
