= Waterloo (constituency) =

Parliamentary constituency in the United Kingdom, 1918–1950

- Former borough constituency for the House of Commons

1918–1950
- Seats: one
- Created from: Southport
- Replaced by: Crosby

Waterloo was a parliamentary constituency centred on the district of Waterloo north of Liverpool in Lancashire. It returned one Member of Parliament (MP) to the House of Commons of the Parliament of the United Kingdom, elected by the first past the post system.

== History ==
The constituency was created for the 1918 general election. It was abolished for the 1950 general election.

== Boundaries ==
The Urban Districts of Great Crosby, Litherland, Little Crosby, and Waterloo with Seaforth.

== Members of Parliament ==
Year	Member	Party
1918	Albert Buckley	Unionist
1923	Malcolm Bullock	Unionist
1950	constituency abolished	

== Election results ==
=== Elections in the 1910s ===
General election 1918: Waterloo
Party		Candidate	Votes	%	±%
C	Unionist	Albert Buckley	13,255	83.5	
	Labour	Samuel Reeves	2,619	16.5	
Majority			10,636	67.0	
Turnout			15,874		
	Unionist win (new seat)				
C indicates candidate endorsed by the coalition government.

=== Elections in the 1920s ===
Stewart-Brown

General election 1922: Waterloo
Party	Candidate	Votes	%	±%
Unionist	Albert Buckley	12,967	67.3	−16.2
Liberal	Nessie Stewart-Brown	6,300	32.7	New
Majority		6,667	34.6	−32.4
Turnout		19,267	69.4	+2.4
Unionist hold		Swing		

General election 1923: Waterloo
Party	Candidate	Votes	%	±%
Unionist	Malcolm Bullock	10,615	51.2	−16.1
Liberal	Robert Lowden Connell	9,965	48.4	+15.7
Majority		650	2.4	−32.2
Turnout		20,580		
Unionist hold		Swing	-16.1	

General election 1924: Waterloo
Party	Candidate	Votes	%	±%
Unionist	Malcolm Bullock	15,704	72.0	+20.8
Labour	George Frank Titt	6,116	28.0	New
Majority		9,588	44.0	+41.6
Turnout		21,820		
Unionist hold		Swing		

Sellars

General election 1929: Waterloo
Party	Candidate	Votes	%	±%
Unionist	Malcolm Bullock	17,299	52.1	−19.9
Labour	John Clifford Leigh	8,142	24.5	−3.5
Liberal	Frederic Aked Sellars	7,728	23.3	New
Majority		9,157	27.6	−16.4
Turnout		33,169		
Unionist hold		Swing	-8.2	

=== Elections in the 1930s ===
1931 general election: Waterloo
Party	Candidate	Votes	%	±%
Unionist	Malcolm Bullock	Unopposed		
Unionist hold				

1935 general election: Waterloo
Party	Candidate	Votes	%	±%
Unionist	Malcolm Bullock	Unopposed		
Unionist hold				

=== Elections in the 1940s ===
General election 1945: Waterloo
Party	Candidate	Votes	%	±%
Conservative	Malcolm Bullock	19,650	47.4	N/A
Labour	Philip Vos	13,795	33.3	New
Liberal	Joseph Daniel Weir	7,823	18.8	New
Independent	Cyril Foster	195	0.5	New
Majority		5,855	14.1	N/A
Turnout		41,463		
Conservative hold		Swing	N/A	
