= George Catlin (political scientist) =

English political scientist and philosopher (1896–1979)

Sir George Catlin
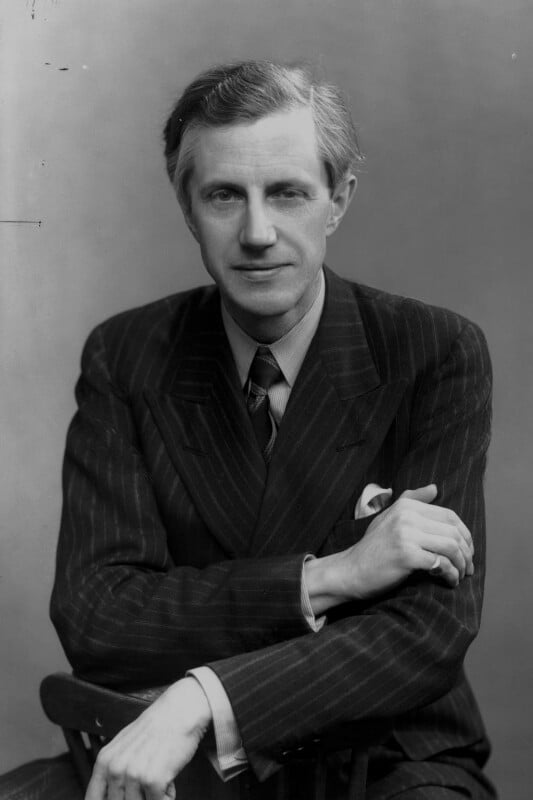
- Catlin in 1941
- Born: George Edward Gordon Catlin; 26 July 1896; Liverpool, England
- Died: 7 February 1979 (aged 82)
- Spouses: Vera Brittain (m. 1925; died 1970) Delinda Gates (m. 1971)
- Children: 2, including Shirley Williams

Academic background
- Education: St Paul's School, London
- Alma mater: New College, Oxford

Academic work
- Discipline: Political science
- Sub-discipline: United Kingdom–United States relations; Thomas Hobbes
- Institutions: Cornell University; Mar Ivanios College; McGill University

Sir George Edward Gordon Catlin (26 July 1896 – 7 February 1979) was an English political scientist and philosopher. A strong proponent of Anglo-American co-operation, he worked for many years as a professor at Cornell University and other universities and colleges in the United States and Canada. He preached the use of a natural science model for political science. McMaster University Library holds his correspondence archive and the body of some of his works. He had two children, one of whom was the politician and academic Shirley Williams.

== Early life ==
Catlin was born in Liverpool, the son of Edith Kate (Orton) and George Edward Catlin (1858–1936), an Anglican clergyman. He was educated at St Paul's School, and New College, Oxford. It was here that he converted to Roman Catholicism after his wartime hiatus.

He volunteered for military service in the early months of the First World War, but was rejected, and spent most of the war working for the liquor traffic department of the Central Control Board. However, he became a soldier in the last months of the war, fighting on the Western Front in Belgium.

== Academic ==
After the war he received a distinction in the Shortened Honours Course in History at Oxford in 1920, and won three major prizes, including the Gladstone Prize and the Matthew Arnold prize in 1921 for his essay on the political thought of Thomas Hobbes entitled Thomas Hobbes as Philosopher, Publicist and Man of Letters. He took up the relatively new field of political science. This was better established in the US and at the invitation of the historian Wallace Notestein he began lecturing at Cornell University where he had the close association of Carl Becker. There he completed his doctoral thesis, published in 1926 entitled The Science and Method of Politics. This was followed in 1929 by A Study of the Principles of Politics. He was an assistant professor of Politics at Cornell by the age of 28 and subsequently twice acting chairman. In 1926 he was appointed to be the director of the National Commission (Social Research Council) to study the impact of prohibition in the United States. His conclusions were subsequently published as a book.

== Politics ==
Catlin was a strong proponent of Anglo-American co-operation, even to the extent of advocating an organic union between the two countries. He published Anglo-Saxony and Its Tradition in 1939. He also had ambitions to be directly involved in British politics through the Labour Party.

Between 1928 and 1931 Catlin was attached to the personal staff of Sir Oswald Mosley. This was a period before Mosley had made his final break with the Labour Party to become openly fascist. In 1929 he assisted H. G. Wells, Arnold Bennett, and others in establishing The Realist magazine.

Catlin was an unsuccessful Labour candidate in two general elections: 1931 in Brentford and Chiswick, and 1935 in Sunderland. From 1935 to 1937 he served on the executive committee of the Fabian Society.

During the 1930s Catlin travelled extensively. He visited Germany, where in 1933 he witnessed the trial of Georgi Dimitrov for, allegedly, setting the Reichstag on fire, a forewarning of what National Socialism was to engender. He travelled to Soviet Russia, for a prolonged study of the newly established Bolshevik regime there, and to Spain, during the height of the Civil War. During this period Catlin wrote a large number of articles as a journalist, mostly for the Yorkshire Post. He served on the campaign team of Presidential candidate Wendell Willkie, during 1940, and his subsequent book, One Anglo-American Nation appeared in 1941. He was an early advocate for the independence of India, after meeting Mahatma Gandhi in 1931 in London. He visited India in 1946 and 1947 and published a tribute to Gandhi after his assassination, In the Path of Mahatma Gandhi (1948). In 1947 Catlin lectured in Peking. He served as Provost of Mar Ivanios College in India for 1953–54 and as chairman and Bronfman Professor in the Department of Economics and Political Science at McGill University between 1956 and 1960. He was a founder of the Movement for Atlantic Union, which was established in 1958. He drafted the constitution of the Paris-based Atlantic Institute, founded in 1961. He was also a member of the Pilgrims Club of Great Britain.

His autobiography, on which he had worked sporadically since the end of the First World War, was finally published in 1972 as For God's Sake, Go!.

== Honours ==
In the 1970 Birthday Honours, Catlin was knighted for services to Anglo-American relations.

== Private life ==
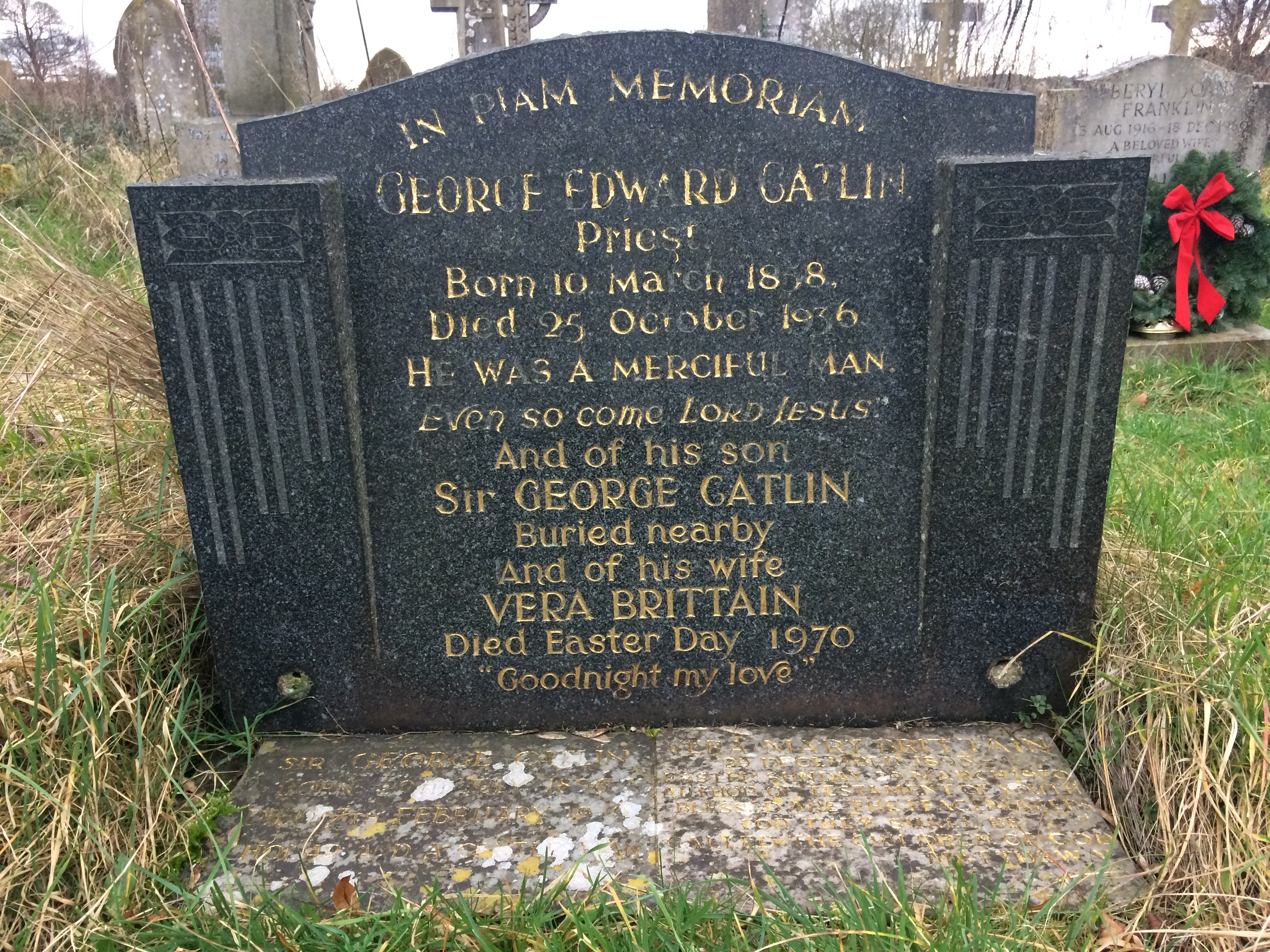
Memorial to Sir George Catlin in Old Milverton churchyard, Warwickshire

Catlin married the English novelist Vera Brittain in 1925 after a courtship that began as a correspondence. She was pursuing her own career as a writer in Britain and the marriage endured many Atlantic-wide separations. They had two children: John Edward Jocelyn Brittain-Catlin (1927–1987), whose memoirs, Family Quartet, appeared in 1987; and the Liberal Democrat politician Shirley Williams, Baroness Williams of Crosby (1930–2021).

After Vera's death in 1970, Catlin married Delinda Gates (1913–2002) in Chelsea, London, in 1971. He died in Southampton, Hampshire, in 1979 at the age of 82 and was buried alongside his father at St James the Great Church, Old Milverton, Warwickshire.
