= 1882 Liverpool School Board election =

Local election in Liverpool, England

Elections to the Liverpool School Board were held on Friday 17 November 1882.

There were twenty-two candidates for the fifteen places on the school board.

Each voter had fifteen votes to cast.

After the election, the composition of the school board was:

Allegiance	Members	±
Church of England	5	
Catholic	4	
Trademen	2	
Nonconformist	2	
Ratepayer	1	
Temperance	1	

* - Retiring board member seeking re-election

Elected

Allegiance	Name	Votes
Tradesmen	H.S. Alpass	
Ratepayers' Association	A. Beatty	
Catholic	John Bligh	
Nonconformist	Samuel Booth *	
Catholic	Patrick Canavan	
Nonconformist	Anne-Jane Davies	
Church of England	H.B. Gilmoor	
Church of England	J.R. Gaskell	
Church of England	James Hakes *	
Catholic	John Hand	
Church of England	J.H. Honeyburn	
Tradesmen	William Hood	
Temperance	J.M. Howie	
Catholic	William Madden	
Church of England	Francis Mulliner *	

Not Elected

Nonconformist	William Oulton
Tradesmen	James Pratt
Neutral	R. G. Rathbone (Chair)
Tradesmen	John Robson
Church of England	Rev. Canon Rycroft
Catholic	Joseph Walton *
Catholic	Richard Yates
