= 1876 Liverpool School Board election =

1876 English local election

Elections to the Liverpool School Board were held on Friday 17 November 1876.

Each voter had fifteen votes to cast.

After the election, the composition of the school board was:

Allegiance	Members	±
Catholic		
Protestant		
Liberal Protestant		
none		
Wesleyan		
Church of England		

* - Retiring board member seeking re-election

Elected

Allegiance	Name	Votes	Occupation	Address
	Rev. J.W. Barsley M.A.		clerk in holy orders	96 Huskisson Street
Liberal Protestant	Samuel Booth *		Agent	20 Caledonia Street
	Rev. Colin Brewster		Congregational Minister	47 Newstead Road
Catholic	Edward Browne *		Corn merchant	7 Olive Mount Villas, Olive Mount
Church of England	J.R. Gaskell		cotton broker	43 Irvine Street
Protestant	James Hakes *		surgeon	30 Hope Street
Protestant	Rev. Richard Hughes		Clerk in holy orders	28 Marmaduke Street
	Rev. Wm. Lefroy		clerk in holy orders	Catharine Street
	F. Mulliner		carriage builder	36 Devonshire Road, Claughton
Nonconformist	William Oulton *		shipowner	Hillside, Woolton
Liberal Protestant	Samuel G. Rathbone JP *		merchant	Yew Tree House, Allerton
	George Segar		barrister at law	231 West Derby Road
Catholic	Joseph Walton *		Barrister-at-law	116 Canning Street
	Peter Williams		Gentleman	17 Percy Street
Catholic	Richarxd Yates		accountant	23 Greenfield Road, Stoneycroft
