= 1891 Liverpool School Board election =

Local election in Liverpool, England

Elections to the Liverpool School Board were held on Tuesday 17 November 1891.

There were twenty-nine candidates for the fifteen board member positions.

Each voter had fifteen votes to cast.

After the election, the composition of the school board was:

Allegiance	Members	±	Votes	Percentage
Church of England	5	+1	188,244	36%
Catholic	6	0	166,833	32%
Nonconformist	3	+1	74,377	14%
Wesleyan	1	+1	41,351	8%
Independent Church of England	0		18,320	3.5%
Orange Order	0		15,894	3.1%
Labour Party	0		5,056	1%
Independent	0		3,593	0.69%
Secular	0		1,994	0.38%
Independent Orange	0		1,418	0.27%
Socialist	0		661	0.13%
Independent Catholic	0		392	0.08%
Total Votes Cast	518,133			
Electorate				
Turnout				

* - Retiring board member seeking re-election

Elected

Allegiance	Name	Votes
Wesleyan	W. Oulton *	41,351
Church of England	Rev. Canon Dyson Rycroft *	39,813
Church of England	Rev. Canon Major Lester *	36,679
Church of England	Rev. Canon E.H. McNeile	33,554
Catholic	M. Fitzpatrick *	30,222
Church of England	Sir James Poole	28,654
Church of England	W. Roberts	27,938
Catholic	J.A. Doughan *	27,762
Catholic	R. Yates *	27,443
Catholic	C. McArdle *	27,344
Catholic	W.J. Sparrow *	27,215
Catholic	J. Hand *	26,847
Nonconformist	Anne Jane Davies *	26,380
Nonconformist	S.G. Rathbone *	26,294
Nonconformist	T.C Ryley	21,703

Not Elected

Church of England	W. Rowlandson	21,606
Independent Church of England	Rev. J. Bell Cox	17,857
Orange	Harry Thomas	15,894
Labour	W.J. Patter	2,529
Labour	C.H. Rouse	2,527
Independent	W.C. Copeland	2,418
Secular	A.E. Newcomb	1,994
Independent Orange	W. Gilbert	1,418
Independent	T.H. Joseph	1,175
Socialist	W. Saxton	661
Independent	C.H. Fox	602
Independent Church of England	H.S. Anthony	463
Independent Catholic	E.J. Walsh	392
