= 1888 Liverpool School Board election =

Local election in Liverpool, England

Election to the Liverpool School Board were held in November 1888.

There were twenty-seven candidates for the fifteen Board member positions.

Each voter had fifteen votes to cast.

After the election, the composition of the school board was:

Allegiance	Members	±
Catholic	6	
Church of England	4	
Independent	3	
Nonconformist	2	

* - Retiring board member seeking re-election

Elected

Allegiance	Name	Votes
Catholic	M. Fitzpatrick	28,053
Catholic	C. McArdle	26,604
Catholic	J.A. Doughan	26,537
Catholic	R. Yates	25,542
Catholic	John Hand *	25,270
Catholic	W.J. Sparrow	25,291
Independent	H. Thomas	22,425
Independent	S.G. Rathbone *	21,337
Church of England	T. Major Lester	18,585
Church of England	R.B. Baron	18,188
Independent	J. Bell Cox	17,763
Church of England	James Hakes *	17,501
Church of England	D. Rycroft *	14,121
Nonconformist	Anne Jane Davies *	13,377
Nonconformist	William Oulton *	11,572

Not Elected

Nonconformist	T.C Ryley	9,705
Church of England	J.H. Parker	8,062
Church of England	W. Pierce	7,698
Independent	J.R. Anderson	4,918
Independent	D.S. Collin	4,432
Independent	W. A. Newcomb	4,131
Independent	H.W. Pearson	2,779
Independent	W. King	755
Independent	W. Saxton	734
Independent	B. Jones	650
Independent	C.J. Fox	452
Independent	H.S. Anthony	252
