= Tony Mulhearn =

British politician and trade union campaigner (1939–2019)

Anthony Mulhearn (24 January 1939 – 7 October 2019) was a British political and trade union campaigner known for being a prominent member of the Socialist Party and its predecessor, the Militant tendency. A native of Liverpool, Mulhearn was a member of the city council from 1984 to 1987 and also held the key role during this time of President of the District Labour Party. With Peter Taaffe, he co-authored a book detailing the struggle of the Liverpool city council called Liverpool: A City that Dared to Fight. Mulhearn's memoirs were published as The Making of a Liverpool Militant.

== Early life ==
Mulhearn was brought up in the downtown Fontenoy Street and Leeds Street area of Everton, Liverpool, and attended Holy Cross School and Bishop Goss secondary modern school before working variously as a baker, tailor, trainee ship steward, apprentice cabinet maker, printer, ship's printer with Canadian Pacific, Ford worker, taxi driver, part-time lecturer and civil servant. He joined the Labour Party in 1963 and stood as the Labour candidate for the constituency of Crosby in the 1979 general election.

== Municipal affairs ==
Mulhearn's involvement with municipal affairs began in March 1980 when he became President of the Liverpool District Labour Party, a body which was responsible for overseeing the activities of Labour councillors on Liverpool city council. In June 1981 he was selected as Labour Party candidate for Liverpool Toxteth, although due to boundary changes the constituency was abolished before the next general election. Mulhearn was elected to Liverpool city council in May 1984 from St Mary's ward.

Mulhearn was a leading member of the controlling group on the city council, and in 1985 played a key role in the budgeting crisis which affected the council. He led the council delegation negotiating with the unions representing council staff when the council, running out of money, decided to issue redundancy notices to its entire workforce in September 1985. Mulhearn insisted that the council would succeed in getting extra funds from the Government, making the notices unnecessary; he also said that Labour Party leader Neil Kinnock had been speaking "from a position of profound ignorance" when he condemned the move. Shortly afterward Mulhearn stood for the Labour candidacy in Knowsley North, attempting to deselect sitting MP Robert Kilroy-Silk.

In 1986, Mulhearn was expelled from the Labour Party following a series of hearings which the party had begun into the involvement of Militant tendency supporters. He remained a councillor until March 1987, when the House of Lords rejected the appeals of 47 Liverpool councillors against the district auditor's finding of 'wilful misconduct' in the council's delayed setting of its budget in 1985.

== Subsequent campaigning ==
After leaving Liverpool City Council, Mulhearn (together with Peter Taaffe) wrote an account of the period when supporters of Militant were leading the council, published as Liverpool: A City that Dared to Fight in 1988. He worked as a taxi driver from 1991 to 2001, and also studied part-time at Liverpool John Moores University for a combined Social Sciences degree (including history, economics and politics). In 1996 he passed with first class honours for his dissertation (on Leon Trotsky), and was given the prize for "most meritorious mature student".

He later worked as an IT support co-ordinator for the Department for Work and Pensions in Warrington, while remaining active in politics as a member of Militant's successor the Socialist Party and a member of the Campaign for a New Workers' Party.

== Liverpool Mayor Election 2012 ==
Mulhearn stood as a TUSC candidate for Mayor of Liverpool on a "6 point programme to defend the working class of Liverpool from cuts to jobs and services". He came fifth, ahead of the Conservative Party candidate.
