= Malcolm Bullock =

British soldier and politician (1889–1966)

Bullock in 1948.

Captain Sir Harold Malcolm Bullock, 1st Baronet, MBE (10 July 1889 – 20 June 1966) was a British soldier and Conservative Party politician.

== Life ==
Bullock was the son of iron merchant Frank M. Bullock, of Milhanger, Thursley, Surrey He was educated at Trinity College, Cambridge. Bullock normally went by his middle name of Malcolm rather than his first name. He reached the rank of Captain in the Scots Guards. In 1923 he was elected as the Member of Parliament (MP) for Waterloo in Lancashire, a position he retained until the constituency was abolished in 1950. He was re-elected in the new Crosby constituency at both the 1950 and 1951 general elections, before resigning as an MP in October 1953 due to ill-health. In February 1954 he was created a baronet, of Crosby in the County Palatine of Lancaster.

Bullock married Lady Victoria Alice Louise Primrose, daughter of Edward Stanley, 17th Earl of Derby and widow of Neil Primrose, in 1919. They had one daughter, Priscilla, who married the racehorse trainer Peter Hastings, later Peter Hastings-Bass. Lady Victoria died in a riding accident in November 1927, aged 35. Bullock died in June 1966, aged 76, when the baronetcy became extinct. His great-granddaughter is Clare Balding.

According to the diaries of close friend and fellow Conservative MP Robert Boothby, Baron Boothby, Bullock was homosexual. At the time, homosexuality was illegal in the United Kingdom, yet Bullock was in a circle of renowned members of British high society who attended Sir Philip Sassoon’s glamorous house parties. Held at Port Lympne Mansion, it was understood as a venue where they could conduct secret relationships in privacy.

Parliament of the United Kingdom
Preceded by Albert Buckley	Member of Parliament for Waterloo; 1923–1950	Constituency abolished
New constituency	Member of Parliament for Crosby; 1950–1953	Succeeded by Graham Page
Baronetage of the United Kingdom
New creation	Baronet (of Crosby); 1954–1966	Extinct
