= Samuel Reeves =

Samuel Reeves (1862 – 9 September 1930) was a British socialist activist.

Reeves was probably born in Glasgow, but grew up in Liverpool, where he began working as a docker before completing an apprenticeship as a coremaker.

Inspired particularly by John Ruskin, Reeves became an active socialist at an early age, and was a founder member of the Democratic Federation. He remained in the group as it became the Social Democratic Federation (SDF), but left in 1887 when the local branch dissolved due to a lack of members. Instead he became a leading figure in the Liverpool Socialist Society, and its secretary from 1889 until 1892, when it became part of the Fabian Society. He contested his first election in 1891, as an independent socialist with the support of the society, coming last in the contest for the School Board.

In 1893, Reeves was a founder of the Independent Labour Party (ILP), and from 1894 chaired its Liverpool District Federal Council. He continued to stand in every local election, now as an ILP candidate, but always without success. Despite this, he was not discouraged, and in 1895 left iron working to set up a newsagent business, believing this would allow him more time for his socialist activism. He also devoted much time to the Liverpool Trades Council, where he was seen as the leading figure in the socialist faction.

Reeves became a dedicated supporter of the Labour Party, and in 1915 was co-opted to the West Derby Board of Guardians. He stood for Labour in Waterloo at the 1918 United Kingdom general election, but was not successful and only just held his deposit. In 1928, he contested his forty-second election, standing for Bootle Town Council, and he finally won a seat, which he held until his death two years later.
