= Mnemosyne (disambiguation) =

Mnemosyne is the Greek goddess of memory.

Mnemosyne may also refer to:

- 57 Mnemosyne, a main belt asteroid
- Mnemosyne (album), by Norwegian saxophonist Jan Garbarek featuring the Hilliard Ensemble
- Mnemosyne (anime), a Japanese animation series
- Mnemosyne: photographs 1974–2004, book surveying the work of Bill Henson
- Mnemosyne: The Parallel Between Literature and the Visual Arts, a book by Mario Praz, published in 1975
- Mnemosyne (journal), a journal of classical studies published since 1852, issued by Brill Publishers
- Mnemosyne (planthopper) Stål, 1866 an insect genus in the Cixiinae
- Mnemosyne (Rossetti), an 1881 painting by Dante Gabriel Rossetti
- Mnemosyne (software), a computer assisted learning tool
- Parnassius mnemosyne, the binomial name for the clouded Apollo butterfly
- Sailor Mnemosyne, a character from the fifth manga arc of Sailor Moon
- Mnemozina (Mnemosyne), a journal published by The Lovers of Wisdom (a Russian society studying German philosophy), 1824–1825
