= Catullus 3 =

Poem by 1st-century BC Roman poet Catullus

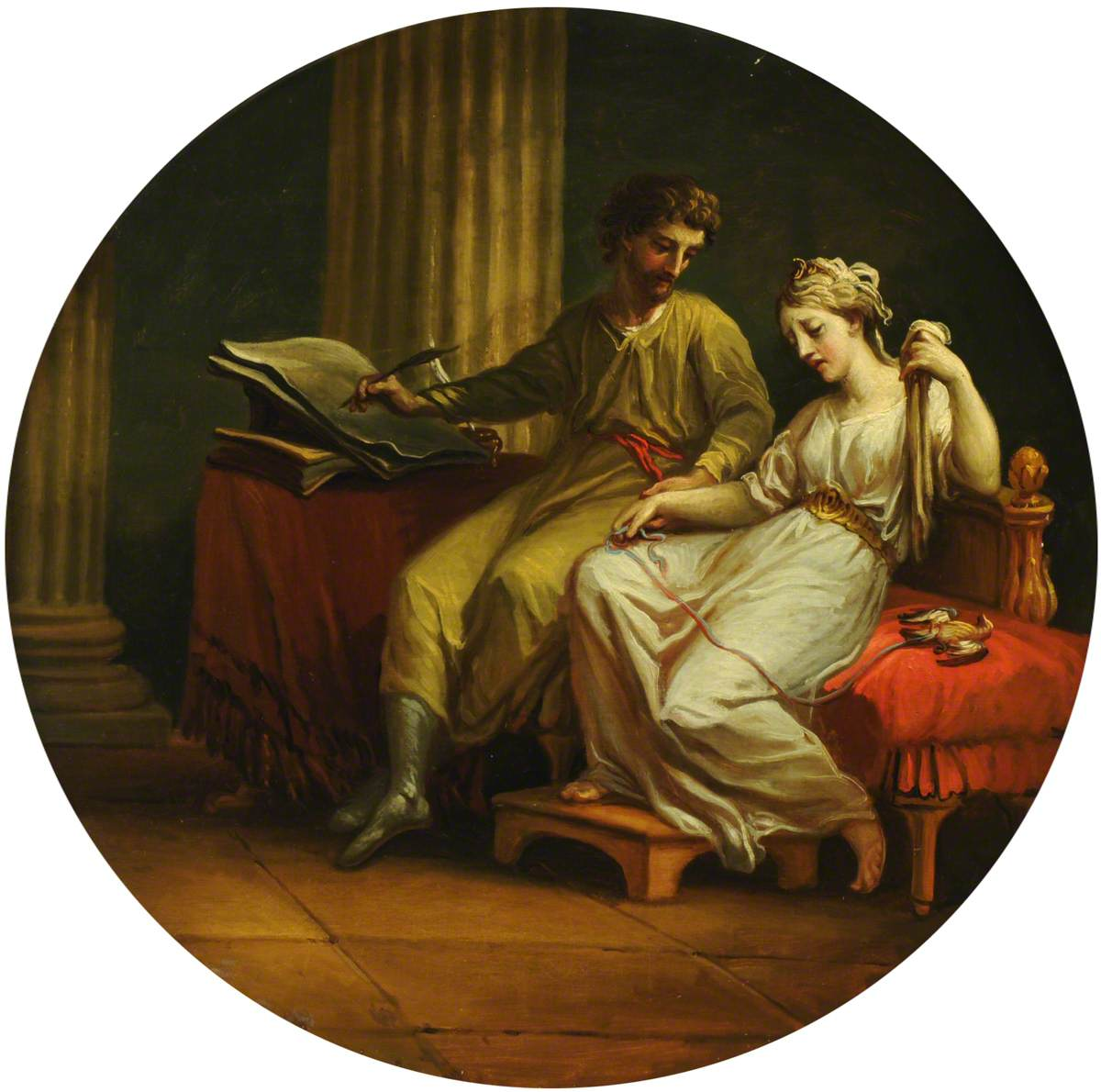
Catullus Comforting Lesbia over the Death of Her Pet Sparrow and Writing an Ode, by Antonio Zucchi, c. 1773

Catullus 3

Catullus 3 is a poem by Roman poet Gaius Valerius Catullus (c. 84–c. 54 BCE) that laments the death of a pet sparrow (passer) for which an unnamed girl (puella), possibly Catullus' lover Lesbia, had an affection. Written in phalaecian hendecasyllabic meter, it is considered to be one of the most famous of Latin poems.

This poem, together with Catullus' other poems, survived from antiquity in a single manuscript discovered c. 1300 in Verona, from which three copies survive. Fourteen centuries of copying from copies left scholars in doubt as to the poem's original wording in a few places, although centuries of scholarship have led to a consensus critical version. Research on Catullus was the first application of the genealogical method of textual criticism.

In the original manuscript, Catullus 3 and Catullus 2 were parts of the same text, but the two poems were separated by scholars in the 16th century.

== Text ==
=== Latin text ===
The metric scheme is ⏒ ⏒ | ‒ ⏑ ⏑ | ‒ ⏑ | ‒ ⏑ | ‒ ⏒ .

Lūgēte, ō Venerēs Cupīdinēsque,
et quantum est hominum venustiōrum:
passer mortuus est meae puellae—
passer, dēliciae meae puellae,
quem plūs illa oculīs suīs amābat.
Nam mellītus erat suamque nōrat
ipsam tam bene quam puella mātrem,
nec sēsē ā gremiō illius movēbat,
sed circumsiliēns modo hūc modo illūc
ad sōlam dominam ūsque pīpiābat.
Quī nunc it per iter tenebricōsum
illūc, unde negant redīre quemquam.
At vōbīs male sit, malae tenebrae
Orcī, quae omnia bella dēvorātis:
tam bellum mihi passerem abstulistis.
Ō factum male! Ō miselle passer!
Tuā nunc operā meae puellae
flendō turgidulī rubent ocellī.

=== English translation ===
Mourn, o Venuses and Cupids
and however many there are of more charming people:
my girl's sparrow is dead—
the sparrow, delight of my girl,
whom that girl loved more than her own eyes.
For he was honey-sweet and had known
the lady as well as a girl [knows] her mother herself,
nor did he move himself from that girl's lap,
but hopping around now here now there
he chirped constantly to his mistress alone,
he who now goes through the shadowy journey
thither, whence they deny that anyone returns.
But may it go badly for you, evil shadows
of hell, who devour all beautiful things.
You have taken from me so beautiful a sparrow.
Oh evil deed! Oh wretched little sparrow!
Now through your deeds the eyes of my girl,
swollen with weeping, are red.

== Analysis ==
Ingleheart finds epigrammatic features in the poem, including a connection with Greek epigrams: the poem, starting with the first word, reads like an epitaph. Tradition of epigrams to dead pets was well established at the time (Thomas points to a potential borrowing from Meleager). The Hellenistic epigrams about dead pets are somewhat parodic, exploiting the disconnect between the ultimately serious topic of death and an insignificance of an animal. Catullus utilizes this effect to focus the attention of the reader on the girl, not the sparrow, producing a celebration of mea puella and essentially turning the girl's loss into his own gain with certain amount of mockery.

In the beginning of the poem, the poet "controls the proceedings", directing Venuses and Amores, and later all men of refine (venustiores) to mourn, following the script of Roman funerals, where a family member or a professional mourner (praefica) would ask the crowd to remember the loss. The fact that all the commotion is about a dead bird is quickly revealed; the standard eulogy would have proceeded along the standard Roman lines: genealogy (skipped in the poem, as pets – and slaves, that also could have been characterized as deliciae – were considered to be creations of their masters), deeds (also none), and character. The latter includes good disposition and loyalty, wording typical for epitaphs. At the end poet refers to the Hades and addresses the deceased in the second person, as was traditional for Roman laudatio funebris.

The traditional reading of the poem (and Catullus 2) is thus straightforward: the poet borrows from the literary tradition of using either a real (or a fictional) connection between a lover and her pet, so he can inject himself into the story as an observer and describe his own relationship with Lesbia. Pomeroy suggests that the poem also reflects on the power relationships in the Roman society, in particular, between a child slave (deliciae, symbolized by the bird) and their master.

=== Latin: passer ===
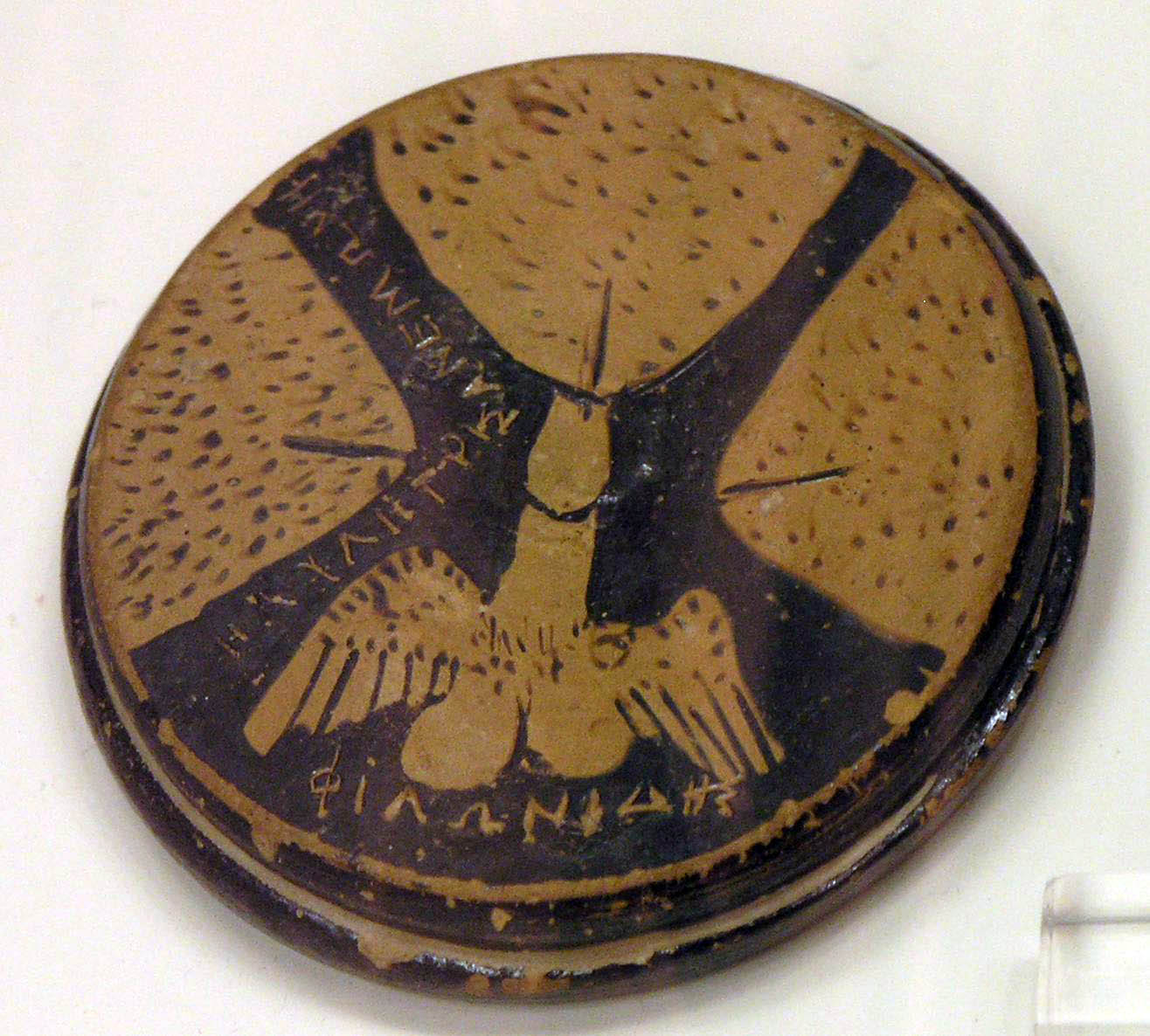
Winged phallus (460-425 B.C.)

Following the printing of Catullus' works in 1472, Poems 2 and 3 gained new influence and ignited the dispute on the meaning of the passer, with some scholars suggesting that the word did not mean a sparrow, but was a phallic symbol, particularly if sinu in line 2 of Catullus 2 is translated as "lap" rather than "bosom". Other scholars, however, have rejected this suggestion. Pomeroy suggests that the clearest arguments "for" belong to Giangrande and "against" – to Jocelyn, Thomas mentions also opposition from Adams, while Vergados and O'Bryhim highlight a collection of papers in a book by Gaisser. This reading of Catullus 3 suggests a description of the end of an amorous affair, while Catullus 2 provides the details of the sexual activities. In Hooper's interpretation, Catullus 3 is a lament about a temporary impotence.

The idea that the word passer in Catullus 2 and 3 is a euphemism for penis apparently dates back to Classical antiquity (cf. Martial with his "I shall give you the sparrow of Catullus"); scholars argued about this interpretation for hundreds of years, since the mid-16th century, when Muretus disagreed with the Politian's 15th century view of passer as a code for obscenity. The dispute even embroiled the Latin dictionaries, with mentions of peculiarly lascivious behavior of passer birds dropped by the Harpers' Latin Dictionary at the end of the 19th century. Elerick credits the longevity of the dispute to Catullus' reputation as a master of double-entendre, and comes up with a translation that keeps the euphemistic interpretation.

Ingleheart states that the sexual interpretation of passer is "certainly not impossible" (suggesting an English equivalent, "pecker"), and points, in addition to the position taken by Martial, to a similar reading of Meleager's epigram on a death of a hare and Catullus 2's imitation of Meleager.

Hooper states that not only the sparrows were associated with general salaciousness by Pliny the Elder (in his Natural history) and Sextus Pompeius Festus, while in Egyptian hieroglyphics an image of the bird denoted "little, evil", but the bird in lines 8–10 of the poem (and in the beginning of Catullus 2) behaves in a very un-sparrow-like way. Festus, in particular, points to mimes that "call the lewd phallus strutheum, evidently from the salaciousness of the sparrow, which in Greek is called strouthos". Thomas stresses that it is unlikely that Catullus was unaware of the metaphorical meaning of a sparrow and points out to the Meleager's poem about a dead hare, where the girl suggestively says, "'Do you see ... that I've stirred up the hare for others."

Vergados and O'Bryhim mark the large erotic vocabulary in Catullus 2 and 3 and suggest a "middle" way: the sparrow is indeed the bird, but it was used by its mistress for sexual acts. Genovese offers interpretations of a passer as a love charm or a symbol of a love rival, Thomas disagrees, but finds these ideas "plausible".

Green analyses the natural behavior of a sparrow and the attitude of Romans towards this bird and suggests that the poem eulogizes either a common house sparrow (Passer domesticus) or the Italian sparrow (Passer italiae).

== Influence on later poetry ==
Catullus 3 in Latin and English

This poem along with the preceding Catullus 2 inspired a genre of poems about lovers' pets. One classical example include Ovid's elegy on the death of his mistress Corinna's parrot (Amores 2.6.). Another is Martial's epigram (Book I number CIX) on a lap dog, which refers to Catullus 2 specifically ("Issa est passere nequior Catulli", "Issa [the dog] is naughtier than Catullus's sparrow"). Hooper, naturally, sees in the latter (although not necessarily in Ovid's writing) a confirmation of the sexual symbolism of the sparrow.

Birds were common love-gifts in the Classical world, and several scholars have speculated that the narrator gave it to the woman; this might explain the poet's identification with the sparrow and his fond lament for the bird in Catullus 3.

== Manuscript tradition ==
A key question concerns the unity of poems 2 and 3. In the copies derived from the original V manuscript, poems 2 (lines 1–10), 2b (lines 11–13), and 3 appear as one poem under the title "Fletus passeris Lesbie" (Lament for Lesbia's Sparrow). Shortly before 1500, Catullus 3 was separated from Catullus 2/2b by Marcantonio Sabellico, which has been supported by scholars ever since.

== Sources ==
- Ingleheart, Jennifer (2003). "Catullus 2 and 3: A Programmatic Pair of Sapphic Epigrams?". Mnemosyne. 56 (5): 551–565. doi:10.1163/156852503770735952.
- Pomeroy, AJ. (2003). "Heavy Petting in Catullus". Arethusa. 36: 49–60. doi:10.1353/are.2003.0006. S2CID 162385298.
- Jones, JW Jr. (1998). "Catullus' Passer as Passer". Greece and Rome. 45 (2): 188–194. doi:10.1093/gr/45.2.188. JSTOR 642982.
- Thomas, Richard F. (1993). "Sparrows, Hares, and Doves: A Catullan Metaphor and its Tradition". Helios. 20 (2): 131–142.
- Vinson M (1989). "And Baby Makes Three? Parental Imagery in the Lesbia Poems of Catullus". The Classical Journal. 85 (1): 47–53. JSTOR 3297486.
- Boyd BW (1987). "The Death of Corinna's Parrot Reconsidered: Poetry and Ovid's "Amores"". The Classical Journal. 82 (3): 199–207. JSTOR 3297900.
- Hooper, RW. (1985). "In Defence of Catullus' Dirty Sparrow". Greece and Rome. 32 (2): 162–178. doi:10.1017/S0017383500030485. JSTOR 642440. S2CID 162225467.
- Nadeau, Y. (1984). "Catullus' Sparrow, Martial, Juvenal and Ovid". Latomus. 43: 861–868.
- Jocelyn, HD. (1980). "On Some Unnecessarily Indecent Interpretations of Catullus 2 and 3". American Journal of Philology. 101 (4). The American Journal of Philology, Vol. 101, No. 4: 421–441. doi:10.2307/293667. JSTOR 293667.
- Giangrande, G. (1975). "Catullus' Lyrics on the Passer". Museum Philologum Londiniense. 1: 137–146.
- Hough JN (1974). "Bird Imagery in Roman Poetry". The Classical Journal. 70 (1): 1–13. JSTOR 3296348.
- Genovese, EN. (1974). "Symbolism in the Passer Poems". Maia. 26: 121–125.
- Lazenby FD (1949). "Greek and Roman Household Pets". The Classical Journal. 44 (5): 299–307. JSTOR 3292469.
- Elerick, Charles (1993). "On translating Catullus 3". Scholia: Studies in Classical Antiquity (2.1): 90–96.
- Vergados, Athanassios; O'Bryhim, Shawn (2012). "Reconsidering Catullus' Passer". Studies in Latin Literature and Roman History. 16: 101–113.
- Gaisser, Julia (2007). "Debating the Sparrow". Catullus. Oxford Readings in Classical Studies. Oxford. pp. 305–340.
- Green, Ashleigh (2021). "Lesbia's Controversial Bird: Testing the Cases for and against Passer as Sparrow". Antichthon. 55: 6–20. doi:10.1017/ann.2021.7. eISSN 2056-8819. ISSN 0066-4774.
- Goold, G. P. (Summer 1969). "Catullus 3.16". Phoenix. 23 (2). Classical Association of Canada: 186–203.
- Ancona, Ronnie (2008). "Catullus 3". Writing Passion: A Catullus Reader 1st Edition. Bolchazy-Carducci Publishers. p. 11. ISBN 978-1-61041-154-7.
