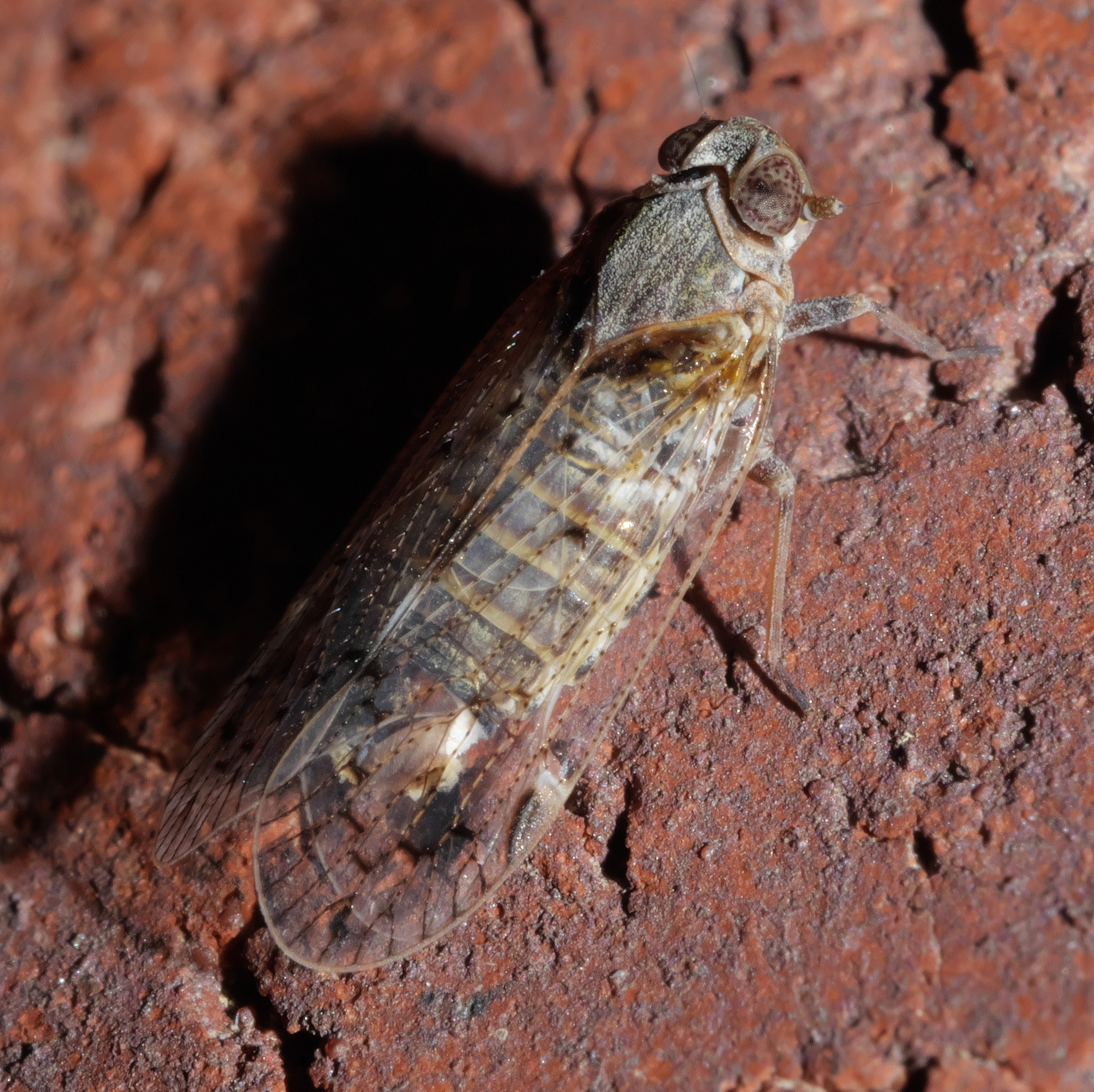
- Oliaridus aridus, Oklahoma

Scientific classification
- Kingdom: Animalia
- Phylum: Arthropoda
- Class: Insecta
- Order: Hemiptera
- Suborder: Auchenorrhyncha
- Infraorder: Fulgoromorpha
- Family: Cixiidae
- Subfamily: Cixiinae
- Tribe: Pentastirini
- Genus: Oliaridus; Hendrix & Bartlett, 2025

= Oliaridus =

Genus of planthoppers

Oliaridus is a genus of cixiid planthoppers in the family Cixiidae. There are about 11 described species in Oliaridus, found in North America.

== Species ==
These 11 species belong to the genus Oliaridus:

- Oliaridus aridus (Ball, 1902)
- Oliaridus caldwelli (Mead & Kramer, 1982)
- Oliaridus californicus (Van Duzee, 1914)
- Oliaridus hesperius (Van Duzee, 1917)
- Oliaridus kieferi (Mead & Kramer, 1982)
- Oliaridus knullorum (Mead & Kramer, 1982)
- Oliaridus lobatus (Caldwell, 1938)
- Oliaridus pima (Kirkaldy, 1907)
- Oliaridus sementinus (Ball, 1902)
- Oliaridus sonoitus (Ball, 1937)
- Oliaridus truncatus (Van Duzee, 1929)
