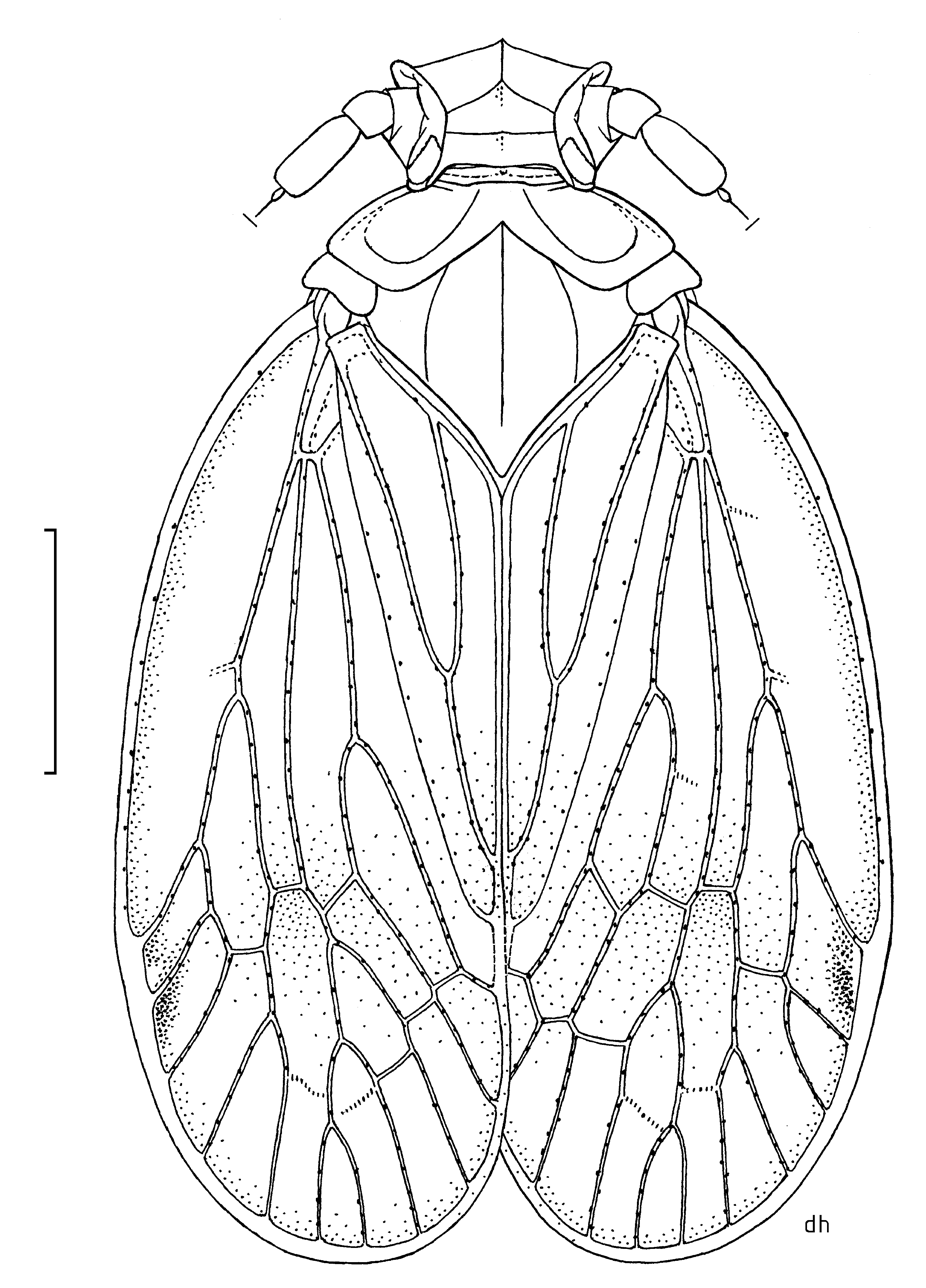
- Drawing of holotype by Des Helmore

Conservation status
- Naturally Uncommon (NZ TCS)

Scientific classification
- Kingdom: Animalia
- Phylum: Arthropoda
- Class: Insecta
- Order: Hemiptera
- Suborder: Auchenorrhyncha
- Infraorder: Fulgoromorpha
- Family: Cixiidae
- Subfamily: Cixiinae
- Tribe: Oecleini
- Genus: Confuga; Fennah, 1975
- Species: C. persephone

Binomial name
- Confuga persephone Fennah, 1975

= Confuga =

Genus of planthoppers

Confuga is a genus of planthoppers in the family Cixiidae. Its only species is Confuga persephone, a troglobitic (cave-dwelling) planthopper that is endemic to New Zealand. It is the only known species of cave-dwelling planthopper in New Zealand. The species was first described by Ronald Gordon Fennah in 1975, from specimens found in a cave east of Tākaka, in the South Island of New Zealand. Under the New Zealand Threat Classification System, it is listed as "Naturally Uncommon" with the qualifier "Range Restricted".
