= Catullus 2 =

Poem by 1st-century BC Roman poet Catullus

Catullus 2 in Latin and English

Catullus 2 is a poem by Roman poet Gaius Valerius Catullus (c. 84–c. 54 BCE) that describes the affectionate relationship between an unnamed puella ('girl', possibly Catullus' lover, Lesbia), and her pet sparrow. As scholar and poet John Swinnerton Phillimore has noted, "The charm of this poem, blurred as it is by a corrupt manuscript tradition, has made it one of the most famous in Catullus' book." The meter of this poem is hendecasyllabic, a common form in Catullus' poetry.

Catullus 2a and 2b read in Latin

This poem, together with Catullus' other poems, survived from antiquity in a single manuscript discovered c. 1300 CE in Verona, from which three copies survive. Fourteen centuries of copying from copies — the "corrupt manuscript tradition" mentioned above — left scholars in doubt as to the poem's original wording in a few places, although centuries of scholarship have led to a consensus critical version. Research on Catullus was the first application of the genealogical method of textual criticism.

Lines 1–10 represent the preserved core of the poem. Lines 11–13 are denoted as "Catullus 2b" and differ significantly in tone and subject from the first 10 lines. Hence, these latter three lines may belong to a different poem. In the original manuscripts, these thirteen lines were combined with Catullus 3, which describes the death of Lesbia's sparrow, but the two poems were separated by scholars in the 16th century.

== Latin text ==
The following Latin text is taken from the 2003 critical edition of D. F. S. Thomson, with macrons added by Wikipedia. The metric scheme is ⏒ ⏒ | ‒ ⏑ ⏑ | ‒ ⏑ | ‒ ⏑ | ‒ ⏒ .

Passer, dēliciae meae puellae,
quīcum lūdere, quem in sinū tenēre,
cui prīmum digitum dare appetentī
et ācrīs solet incitāre morsūs,
cum dēsīderiō meō nitentī
cārum nesciō̆ quid lubet iocārī,
et sōlāciolum suī dolōris,
crēdō, ut tum gravis acquiēscat ardor:
tēcum lūdere sīcut ipsa possem
et trīstīs animī levāre cūrās!

The following lines 11–13 (Catullus 2b) refer to the Greek myth of Atalanta, a young princess who was remarkably swift of foot. To avoid marriage, she stipulated that she would marry only a man who could beat her in a footrace; suitors who failed to defeat her would be put to death. The hero Melanion (also known as Hippomenes) wooed Atalanta, who fell in love with him. During the race, Melanion threw a golden apple to distract her; stooping to pick it up, Atalanta lost the race, possibly deliberately so that she could marry him. The final line refers to undressing on the wedding night.

tam grātum est mihi quam ferunt puellae,
pernīcī aureolum fuisse mālum,
quod zōnam soluit diū ligātam.

== Poetic features ==
Catullus was renowned for his meticulous care in crafting poems, even those with seemingly trifling content. Various artful devices are woven into the text of this poem, composed in hendecasyllabic verse. Lines 2–4 represent a tricolon crescens, in which the three relative clauses become gradually longer in length: quem ludere, quem in sinu tenere, and cui primum digitum dare appetenti et acris solet incitare morsus. The repeated "eee" sounds (corresponding to the letter "i" in Latin) evoke the songbird's peeping (pipiabat in Catullus 3), e.g., (quicum ... in sinu ... cui primum ... appetenti ... acris ... nitenti ... iocari). The "a" sounds may also convey images: the poet's sighs of longing; an "ouch!" at being bitten sharply (appetenti, "pecking" and acris, "sharp"); and a comforting sound (solaciolum, "small comfort", and acquiescat, "calms").

== Influence on later poetry ==
This poem and the following Catullus 3 (a lament for Lesbia's sparrow) inspired a genre of poems about lovers' pets. One classical example include Ovid's elegy on the death of his mistress Corinna's parrot (Amores 2.6.). Another is Martial's epigram (Book I number CIX) on a lap dog, which refers to Catullus 2 specifically ("Issa est passere nequior Catulli", "Issa [the dog] is naughtier than Catullus's sparrow").

Following the printing of Catullus's works in 1472, Poems 2 and 3 gained new influence. From the earliest days after the re-discovery of Catullus' poems, some scholars have suggested that the bird was a phallic symbol, particularly if sinu in line 2 is translated as "lap" rather than "bosom". Other scholars, however, have rejected this suggestion.

Birds were common love-gifts in the Classical world, and several scholars have speculated that the narrator gave it to the woman; this might explain the poet's identification with the sparrow and his fond lament for the bird in Catullus 3. The biting it does in line 4 ties in with Catullus 8, line 18 (cui labella mordebis).

== Manuscript tradition ==
A key question concerns the unity of this poem. In the copies derived from the original V manuscript, poems 2 (lines 1–10 below), 2b (lines 11–13 below), and Catullus 3 appear as one poem under the title "Fletus passeris Lesbie" (Lament for Lesbia's Sparrow). Shortly before 1500, Catullus 3 (the lament) was separated from Catullus 2/2b by Marcantonio Sabellico, which has been supported by scholars ever since.

Scholars have argued over whether the last three lines (2b) belong to a different poem, and whether words are missing between poems 2 and 2b. Scholars suggest that missing words (a lacuna), or a variant reading/rearrangement of the received text, would smooth the presently abrupt transition between lines 10 and 11. As noted above, there is some manuscript evidence for missing words after line 10. However, scholar S.J. Harrison, who believes the 13 lines are unified, has argued that "there seems to be no vital gap in content which short lacuna would supply" and if the missing words are many, then it is impossible to guess what they were and the poem must be accepted as simply broken into fragments.

Catullus 2 and 2b differ significantly in their tone and subject. Catullus 2 is addressed directly to the bird ("with you") and describes its loving, playful relationship with the poet's girlfriend. By contrast, Catullus 2b mentions neither bird nor girlfriend, introducing a simile to the story of Atalanta, and seems to be written in the third person ("it is as welcome to me"), although some scholars have suggested that the text was corrupted from the second person ("you are as welcome to me"). The disjunction between Catullus 2 and 2b was first noted by Aquiles Estaço (Achilles Statius) in 1566; however, the first printed edition to show a lacuna between poems 2 and 2b (by the editor Karl Lachmann) appeared quite late, in 1829. Lachmann's separation of 2 and 2b has been followed by most subsequent editors.

== Classical tradition ==
In The History of Tom Jones, a Foundling (Book IV, ch. III, 1749), Henry Fielding adapts the poem to his prose. Tom gives Sophia a little bird. Fielding writes:

Of this bird, Sophia, then about thirteen years old, was so extremely fond, that her chief business was to feed and tend it, and her chief pleasure to play with it. By these means little Tommy, for so the bird was called, was become so tame, that it would feed out of the hand of its mistress, would perch upon the finger, and lie contented in her bosom, where it seemed almost sensible of its own happiness.

== Bibliography ==
- Johnson M (2003). "Catullus 2b: The Development of a Relationship in the Passer Trilogy". The Classical Journal. 99 (1): 11–34. JSTOR 3298079.
- Jennifer Ingleheart (2003). "Catullus 2 and 3: A Programmatic Pair of Sapphic Epigrams?". Mnemosyne. 56 (5): 551–565. doi:10.1163/156852503770735952.
- Pomeroy AJ. (2003). "Heavy Petting in Catullus". Arethusa. 36: 49–60. doi:10.1353/are.2003.0006. S2CID 162385298.
- Jones, JW Jr. (1998). "Catullus' Passer as Passer". Greece and Rome. 45 (2): 188–194. doi:10.1093/gr/45.2.188. JSTOR 642982.
- Thomas, RF. (1993). "Sparrows, Hares, and Doves: a Catullan Metaphor". Helios. 20: 131–142.
- Vinson M (1989). "And Baby Makes Three? Parental Imagery in the Lesbia Poems of Catullus". The Classical Journal. 85 (1): 47–53. JSTOR 3297486.
- Boyd BW (1987). "The Death of Corinna's Parrot Reconsidered: Poetry and Ovid's "Amores"". The Classical Journal. 82 (3): 199–207. JSTOR 3297900.
- Hooper, RW. (1985). "In Defence of Catullus' Dirty Sparrow". Greece and Rome. 32 (2): 162–178. doi:10.1017/S0017383500030485. JSTOR 642440. S2CID 162225467.
- Nadeau, Y. (1984). "Catullus' Sparrow, Martial, Juvenal and Ovid". Latomus. 43: 861–868.
- Jocelyn, HD. (1980). "On Some Unnecessarily Indecent Interpretations of Catullus 2 and 3". American Journal of Philology. 101 (4). The American Journal of Philology, Vol. 101, No. 4: 421–441. doi:10.2307/293667. JSTOR 293667.
- Giangrande, G. (1975). "Catullus' Lyrics on the Passer". Museum Philologum Londiniense. 1: 137–146.
- Hough JN (1974). "Bird Imagery in Roman Poetry". The Classical Journal. 70 (1): 1–13. JSTOR 3296348.
- Genovese, EN. (1974). "Symbolism in the Passer Poems". Maia. 26: 121–125.
- Bishop JD. (1966). "Catullus 2 and Its Hellenistic Antecedents". Classical Philology. 61 (3): 158–167. doi:10.1086/365126. JSTOR 268677. S2CID 161360041.
- Lazenby FD (1949). "Greek and Roman Household Pets". The Classical Journal. 44 (5): 299–307. JSTOR 3292469.
- Frank T (1927). "On Some Fragments of Catullus". Classical Philology. 22 (4): 413–414. doi:10.1086/360954. JSTOR 262983. S2CID 162291182.
- Brotherton, B. (1926). "Catullus' Carmen II". Classical Philology. 21 (4): 361–363. doi:10.1086/360832. JSTOR 263684. S2CID 162272073.
- Braunlich AF (1923). "Against Curtailing Catullus' "Passer"". The American Journal of Philology. 44 (4). The American Journal of Philology, Vol. 44, No. 4: 349–352. doi:10.2307/289256. JSTOR 289256.
- Kent RG (1923). "Addendum on Catullus' Passer". The American Journal of Philology. 44 (4). The American Journal of Philology, Vol. 44, No. 4: 323–324. doi:10.2307/289257. JSTOR 289257.
- Fay EW (1913). "Catullus Carmen 2". Classical Philology. 8 (3): 301–309. doi:10.1086/359800. JSTOR 261688. S2CID 162227770.

Argues in favor of desiderio meo nitenti meaning "radiant lady of my longing", despite dative case. Also argues that ardor could mean ira, credo might have been quaero or quaeso, and there is likely no lacuna between lines 10 and 11.

- Anderson WB (1911). "Some 'Vexed Passages' in Latin Poetry". The Classical Quarterly. 5 (3): 181–184. doi:10.1017/S0009838800019595. JSTOR 635797. S2CID 170639627.

Calls lines 11-13 the carmen vexatissimum. Suggests subit in line 7: Et solaciolum subit doloris.

- Phillimore JS. (1910). "Passer: Catull. Carm. ii". Classical Philology. 5 (2): 217–219. doi:10.1086/359388. JSTOR 262194.

Makes lines 11-13 into a speech by Lesbia to her bird; "you are as welcome to me..." Argues against desiderio meo nitenti meaning "radiant lady of my longing", but rather "when she is shining with longing for me".

- McDaniel WB (1908). "Catvllvs IIb". The Classical Quarterly. 2 (3): 166–169. doi:10.1017/S0009838800005644. JSTOR 635759. S2CID 170644454.

Excellent review of solutions proposed in the 19th century. Supports a three-poem model, in which gratum refers to meeting his lover, Lesbia.
