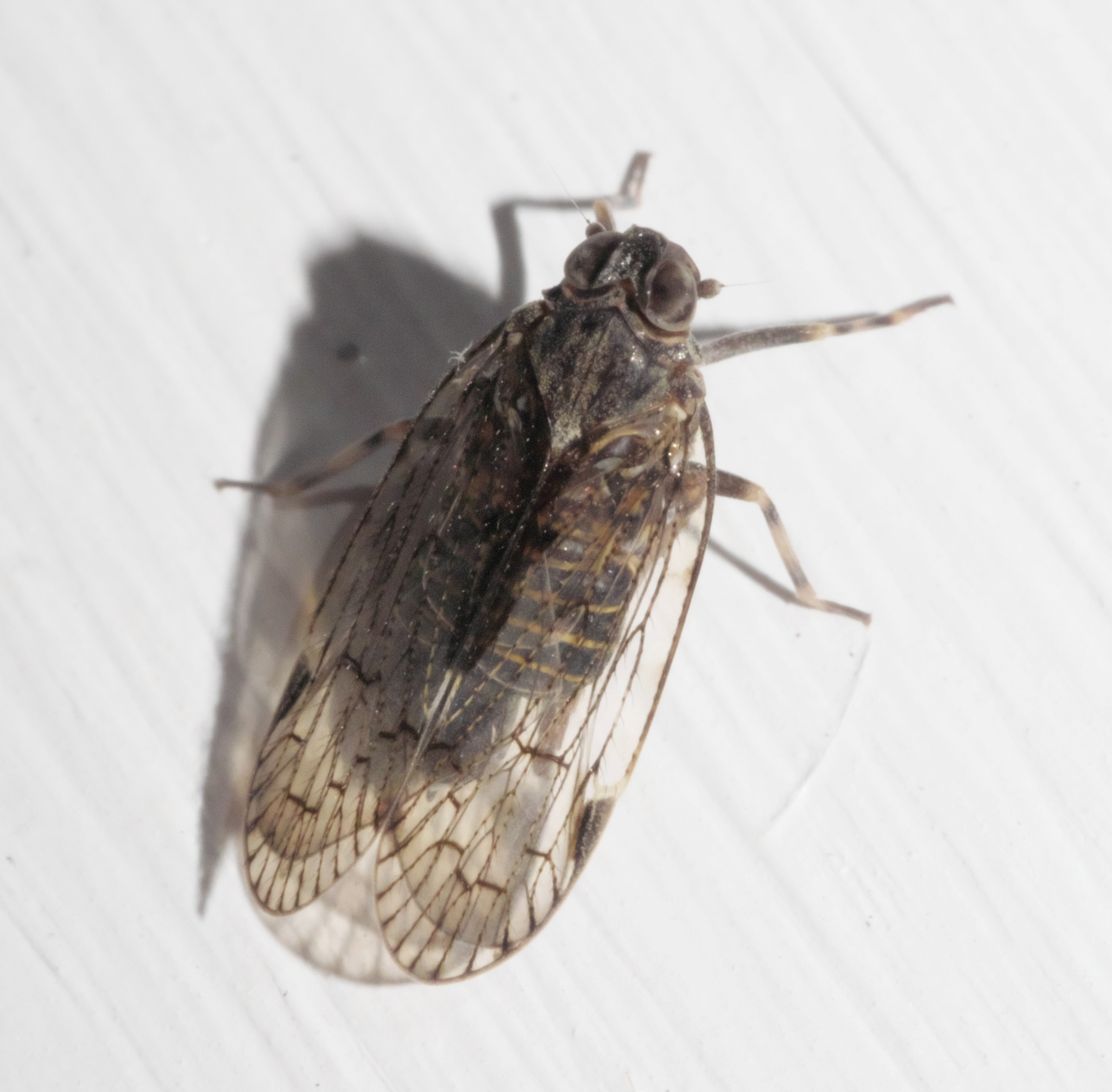
- Xenoliarus placitus, Oklahoma

Scientific classification
- Kingdom: Animalia
- Phylum: Arthropoda
- Class: Insecta
- Order: Hemiptera
- Suborder: Auchenorrhyncha
- Infraorder: Fulgoromorpha
- Family: Cixiidae
- Subfamily: Cixiinae
- Tribe: Pentastirini
- Genus: Xenoliarus; Hendrix & Bartlett, 2025

= Xenoliarus =

Genus of planthoppers

Xenoliarus is a genus of cixiid planthoppers in the family Cixiidae. There are at least four described species in Xenoliarus.

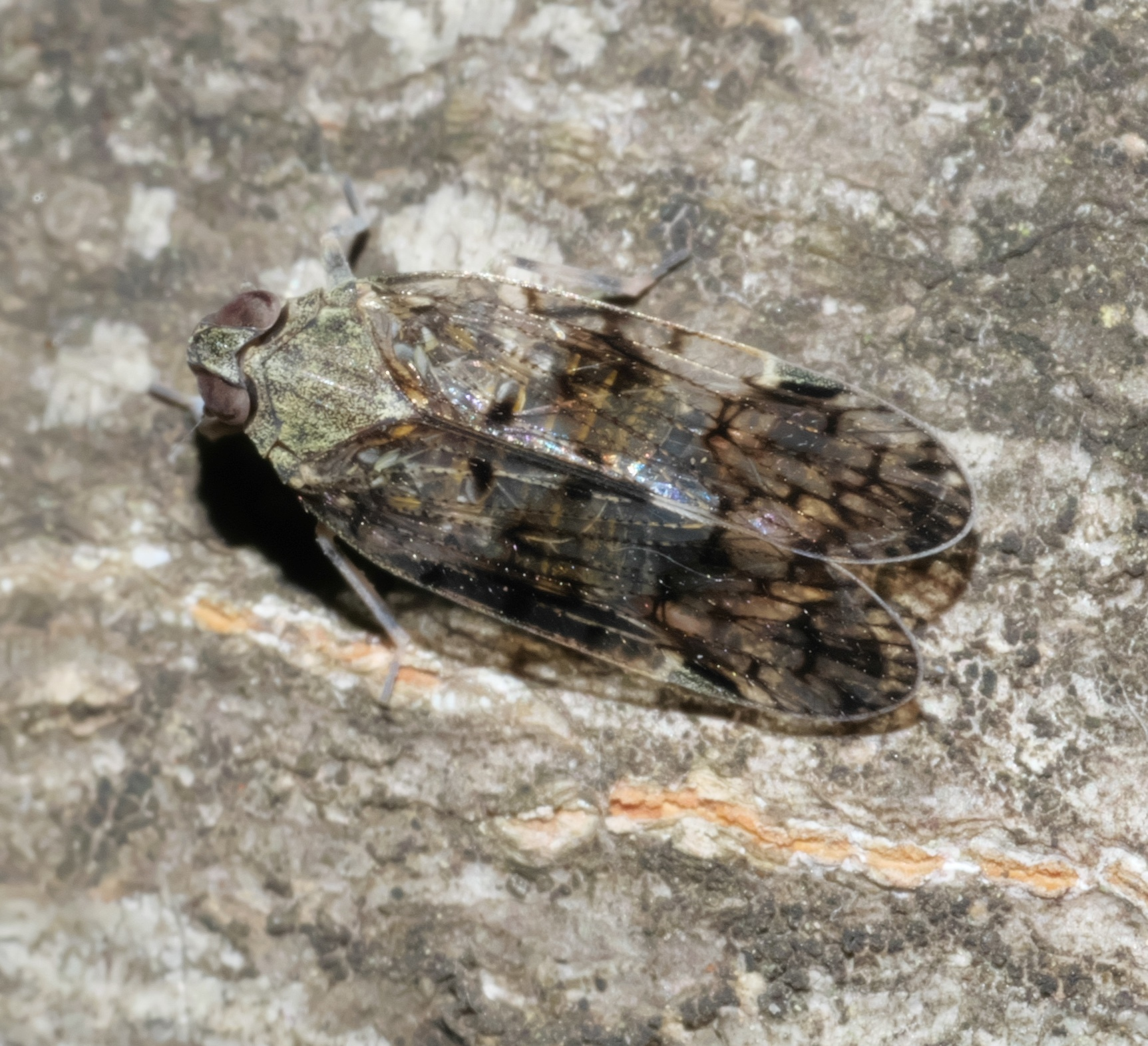
Xenoliarus placitus, Oklahoma

== Species ==
These four species belong to the genus Xenoliarus:

- Xenoliarus eximus (Caldwell, 1947)
- Xenoliarus montanus (Metcalf, 1923)
- Xenoliarus placitus (Van Duzee, 1912)
- Xenoliarus teximus (Caldwell, 1947)
