= Lesbia (play) =

Play by Richard Davey

- Written by: Richard Davey
- Characters: Lesbia, Catullus
- Original language: English
- Genre: Comedy
- Setting: Ancient Rome

Premiere
- Date premiered: 17 September 1888
- Place premiered: Lyceum Theatre, London

Lesbia is a one-act play written by Richard Davey. The story is a comedy about the relationship between the Roman poet Catullus and his lover Lesbia. The actor-manager Richard Mansfield staged the play at the Lyceum Theatre in London, where it debuted on 17 September 1888 with Beatrice Cameron as Lesbia. Mansfield later took the play to the United States as part of the repertory of his company.

== Plot ==
The impoverished poet Catullus decides to break up with his mistress, Lesbia, and marry Affra, an elderly widow, to get access to Affra's fortune. Unwilling to let the relationship end, Lesbia conspires with her servant Sibilla to win Catullus back. They pretend that Lesbia is heartbroken because her pet sparrow has died. Seeing her pretended grief reminds Catullus what a kind, gentle woman Lesbia is, and he decides to stay with her.

== Cast and characters ==
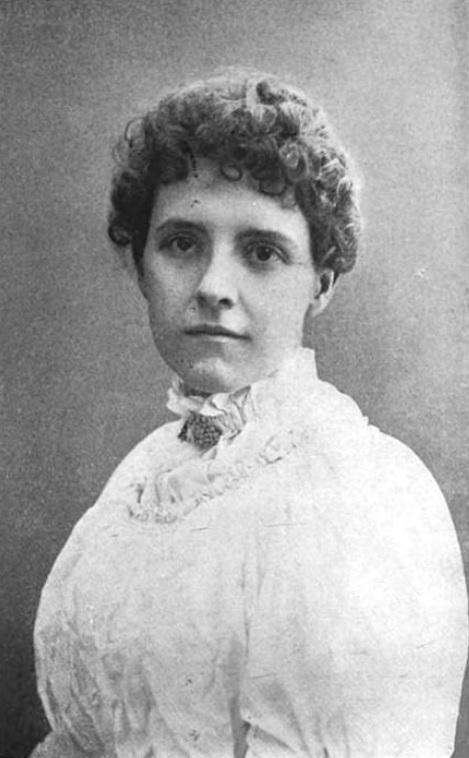
Beatrice Cameron played Lesbia on the West End and Broadway.

The play was produced at the Lyceum Theatre in London's West End and at the Madison Square Theatre on Broadway with the following casts:

Opening night casts
Character	Lyceum cast	Madison Square cast
Lesbia	Beatrice Cameron	Beatrice Cameron
Catullus	John T. Sullivan	Robert S. Taber
Sibilla	Mrs. Sol-Smith	Mrs. Brutone
Affra	Johnstone Bennett	Ethel Sprague
Claudia	Maude White	Edith Day

== History ==
English journalist and playwright Richard Davey wrote the play in 1888. That year the company of Richard Mansfield, which was normally based in the United States, was visiting England. Mansfield selected Lesbia as a showcase for one of the company's actresses, Beatrice Cameron. The play debuted at the Lyceum Theatre in London's West End on 17 September 1888. It served as a comedic curtain raiser before the company's performance of the thriller Dr. Jekyll and Mr. Hyde. When Mansfield's company returned to the U.S., he kept Lesbia as part of the company's repertory. The play opened on Broadway at the Madison Square Theatre on 8 October 1890, again as a curtain raiser before Dr. Jekyll and Mr. Hyde.

== Dramatic analysis ==
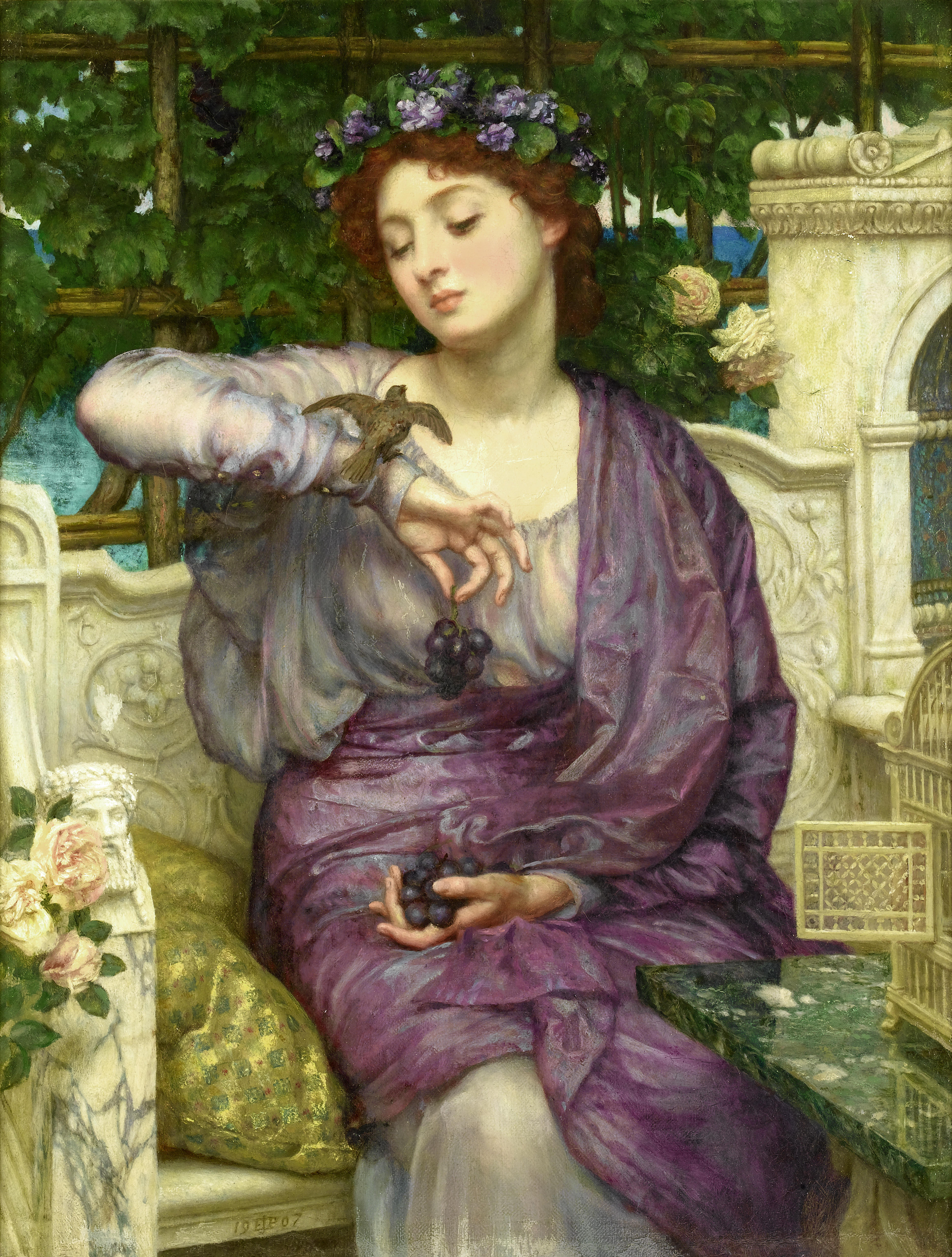
Lesbia with her sparrow, depicted in a 1907 painting by Edward Poynter

Davey based the story on the poems of Catullus, which frequently mention a lover he called Lesbia. (Note: "Lesbia" was not her real name; it is an allusion to the Greek poet Sappho of Lesbos. Her true identity is uncertain, but is most commonly believed to be Clodia, the wife of a Roman politician.) One of the poems focuses on Lesbia's love for her pet sparrow, and a related poem describes her mourning after its death. Some dialogue in the play was based on translations of lines from Catullus' poems.

Other writers had based stories on these poems previously. An article in The Athenaeum speculated that Davey picked up the story idea from "some short novella of an Italian story-teller". The reviewer for The New York Times suggested Davey adapted material from Le Moineau de Lesbie, an 1848 play by the French writer Armand Barthet. Barthet's play also depicts Catullus planning to marry another woman, only to be won back by Lesbia.

== Reception ==
The play received mixed reviews. The Saturday Review described the Lyceum premier as an exercise in "literary self-indulgence" that focused too much on making classical allusions, leaving the cast to struggle with difficult dialogue. The reviewer for The Theatre thought the dialogue was adequate but poorly handled by the cast. The New York Times review of the Madison Square opening described the play as "gracefully written" and mostly well-acted.
