= BGGS =

BGGS may refer to:

- Bradford Girls' Grammar School
- Brisbane Girls Grammar School
- Brigadier-General, General Staff
