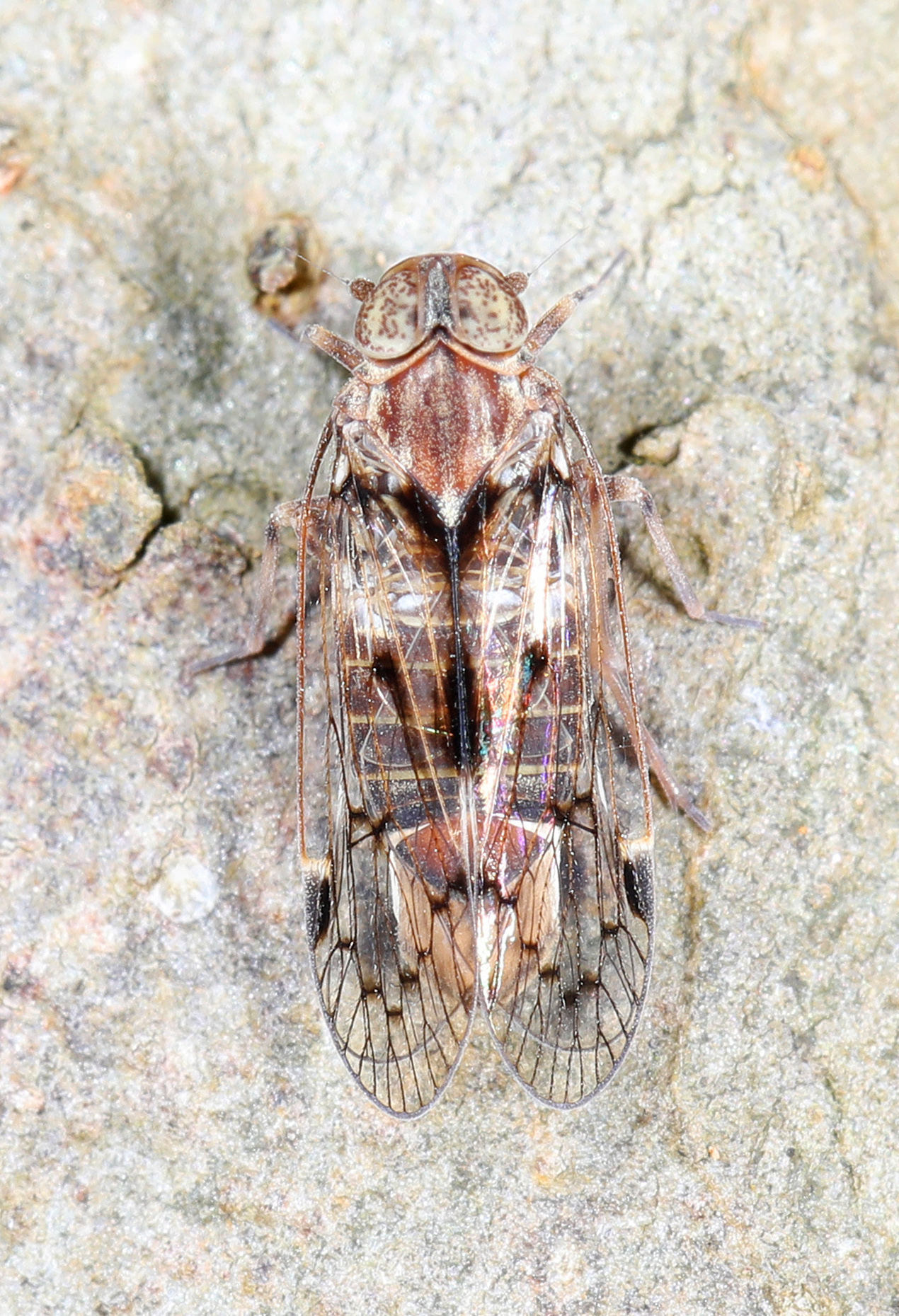
- Antilliarus slossoni, Florida

Scientific classification
- Kingdom: Animalia
- Phylum: Arthropoda
- Class: Insecta
- Order: Hemiptera
- Suborder: Auchenorrhyncha
- Infraorder: Fulgoromorpha
- Family: Cixiidae
- Subfamily: Cixiinae
- Tribe: Pentastirini
- Genus: Antilliarus; Hendrix & Bartlett, 2025

= Antilliarus =

Genus of planthoppers

Antilliarus is a genus of cixiid planthoppers in the family Cixiidae. There are at least four described species in Antilliarus.

== Species ==
These four species belong to the genus Antilliarus:

- Antilliarus aztecus (Caldwell, 1947)
- Antilliarus jamaicensis (Fennah, 1945)
- Antilliarus pirata (Fennah, 1971)
- Antilliarus slossoni (Van Duzee, 1912)
