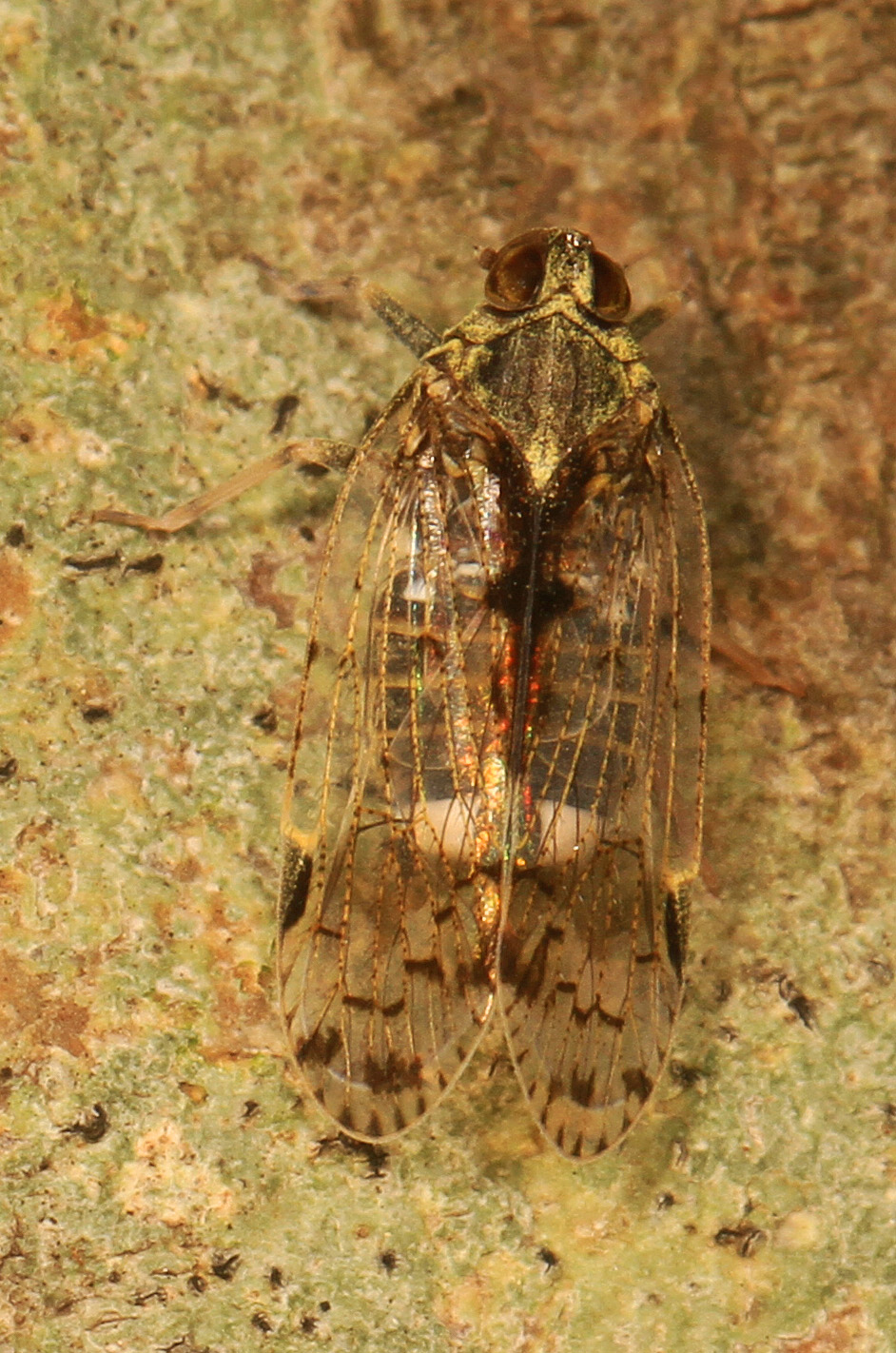

Scientific classification
- Domain: Eukaryota
- Kingdom: Animalia
- Phylum: Arthropoda
- Class: Insecta
- Order: Hemiptera
- Suborder: Auchenorrhyncha
- Infraorder: Fulgoromorpha
- Family: Cixiidae
- Genus: Melanoliarus
- Species: M. placitus

Binomial name
- Melanoliarus placitus Van Duzee, 1912

= Melanoliarus placitus =

Species of true bug

Melanoliarus placitus is a species of cixiid planthopper in the family Cixiidae.
