= Louisa Pesel =

British textile designer

- Born: 1870; Bradford, Yorkshire, England
- Died: 1947 (aged 76–77); Winchester, Hampshire, England
- Education: Bradford Girls' Grammar School; National Art Training School
- Style: Embroidery; Knitting
- Elected: Embroiderers' Guild (president)

Louisa Pesel (1870–1947) was an English embroiderer, educator and textile collector. She was born in Bradford, and studied textile design at the National Art Training School, causing her to become interested in decorative stitchery. She served as the director of the Royal Hellenic School of Needlework and Lace in Athens, Greece, from 1903 to 1907. Pesel served as the first president of the Embroiderers' Guild. She produced samplers for the Victoria and Albert (V&A) Museum and cushions, kneelers, alms bags and a lectern carpet for Winchester Cathedral. She collected textiles extensively, and following her death in Winchester in 1947, her collection went to the University of Leeds.

== Education ==
Pesel was born in Bradford in 1870 to Frederic and Isabella Pesel. Louisa Pesel was of German descent. Frederic was a textile merchant, stockbroker and magistrate, and Isabella was from an influential Leeds family. After attending Bradford Girls' Grammar School, she studied textile design under Lewis Foreman Day, who was active in the Arts and Crafts Movement, at the National Art Training School.

== Commissions and positions ==
In 1900, Pesel won a silver medal for a framed panel with inlay and applique at the Women's Exhibition in Earl's Court, London. After a recommendation by Day, she took a post in 1903 as designer the Royal Hellenic School of Needlework and Lace in Athens, and was its director until 1907. Returning to England to look after her ailing mother, Pesel assisted in setting up the West Riding Needlecraft Association.

In 1910 the Victoria and Albert (V&A) Museum commissioned Pesel to produce a series of samplers of historic English embroidery stitches, which led to three V&A portfolio publications. During this period, Pesel also lectured on stitching at the V&A, the British Council, the British Association, and elsewhere.

During the First World War, Pesel worked with the Bradford Khaki Handicrafts Club to teach embroidery to Belgian refugees and to soldiers who had returned from the front, believing that the colourful designs and soothing effect of handwork could assist in the recovery from shell-shock.

In 1920, Pesel was elected as the first president of the Embroiderers' Guild and served until 1922. She was appointed by the Board of Education as an Extra Inspector of Needlework, to provide instruction to teachers.

== Winchester life and cathedral commissions ==
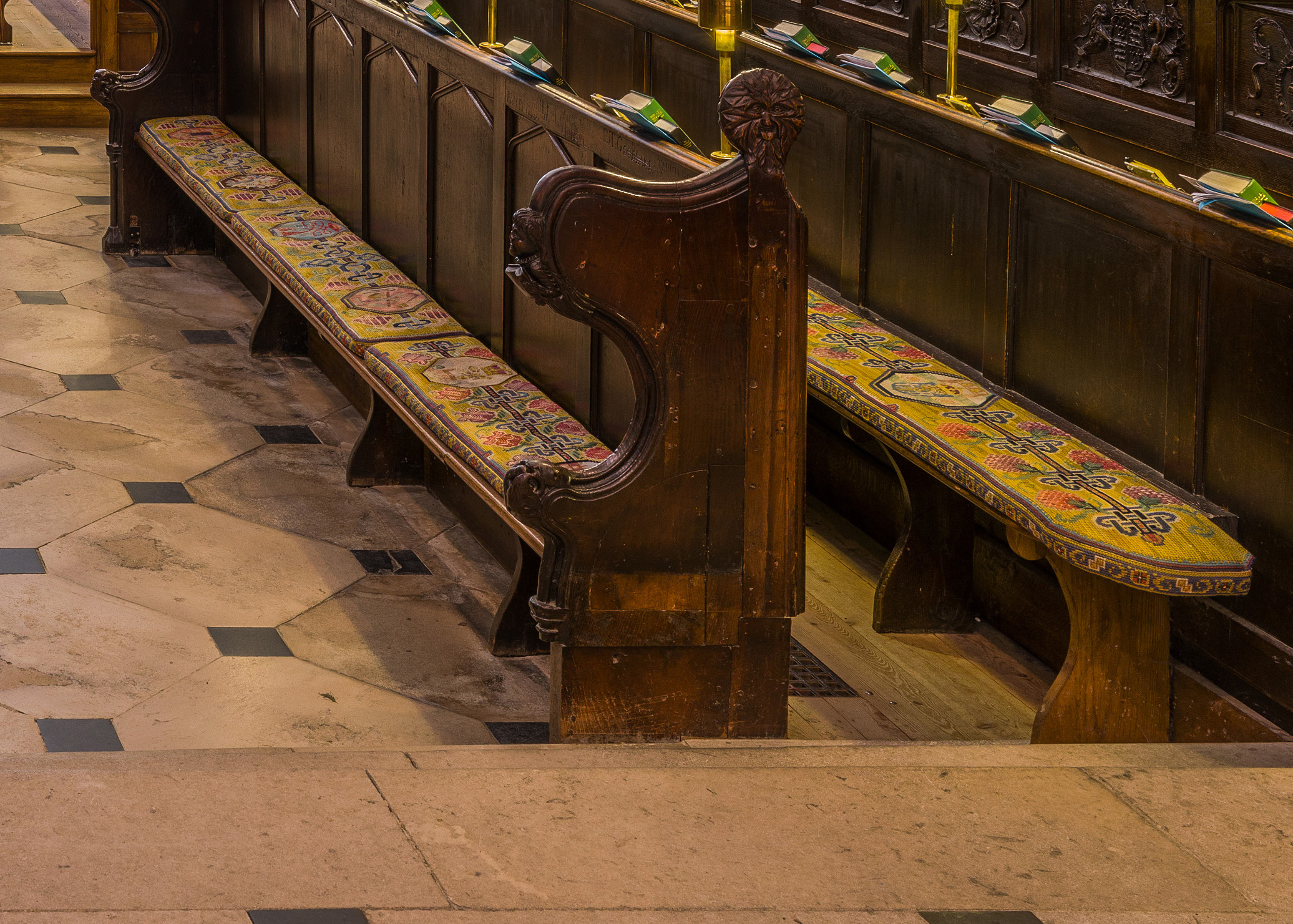
Embroidered cushions in the choir stalls of Winchester Cathedral

After the death of her father in 1922, Pesel moved from Bradford, eventually settling in Twyford, Hampshire, in 1925, teaching embroidery locally. The Bishop of Winchester, Bishop Woods, requested Pesel make cushions for the chapel attached to his residence, in 1931. She designed cushions and kneelers, which were executed by the Wolvesey Canvas Embroidery Guild. The dean of the cathedral, Gordon Selwyn, was so impressed he then asked Pesel to design and sew textiles for the cathedral itself. Pesel, who oversaw the entire project, was helped by the artist Sybil Blunt, who designed the medallions of the bench cushions and many stall cushions. Pesel, Blunt, and two assistants taught new volunteers, tested designs and stitches, and completed work left unfinished by the group of stitchers from the area who were helping. Between May 1932 and 1936, 360 chair kneelers, 96 alms bags, 34 bench cushions, 62 stall cushions, 1 lectern carpet, and more were presented to the cathedral. Over 800 men and women helped with the initiative.

Pesel was appointed as the Mistress of Broderers at Winchester Cathedral in 1938.

Pesel did not marry, and died in Winchester in 1947. A pall that she had designed for use in the cathedral, made of dark blue hessian and embroidered with gold thread and colored wool, was used at her funeral.

== Textile collections ==
Throughout her life and travels, Pesel collected textiles. On her death in 1947, the collection was bequeathed to the University of Leeds. Pesel had amassed or created more than 400 embroidered items, most from Turkey and Greek islands, but also from Morocco, Algeria, Turkestan, India, Pakistan, Persia, Syria, China, and Western Europe. Some of Pesel's own pieces and samples are included, along with personal papers, photograph albums, books and teaching aids.

Works that Pesel collected were included in a 2020 London exhibition, "Unbound: Visionary Women Collecting Textiles".

== In popular culture ==
Louisa Pesel, in her role at Winchester Cathedral, features in Tracy Chevalier's 2019 novel A Single Thread.

== Publications ==
- Embroidery: or, The craft of the needle, by W. G. Paulson Townsend, assisted by Louisa F. Pesel. 1907
- Stitches from old English embroideries. London, P. Lund, Humphries & Co, Ltd, 1912
- Stitches from eastern embroideries from countries bordering on the Mediterranean, from Greece, the Near East and Persia. By Louisa F. Pesel 1913
- Practical Canvas Embroidery. London, Batsford, 1929
- English embroidery. 1931
- Leaves from my embroidery note-books, Pesel, Louisa Frances. London, B.T. Batsford Ltd, 1938
- Historical Designs for Embroidery. 1956 (published posthumously)
- Articles published in Embroidery and The Embroideress magazines
