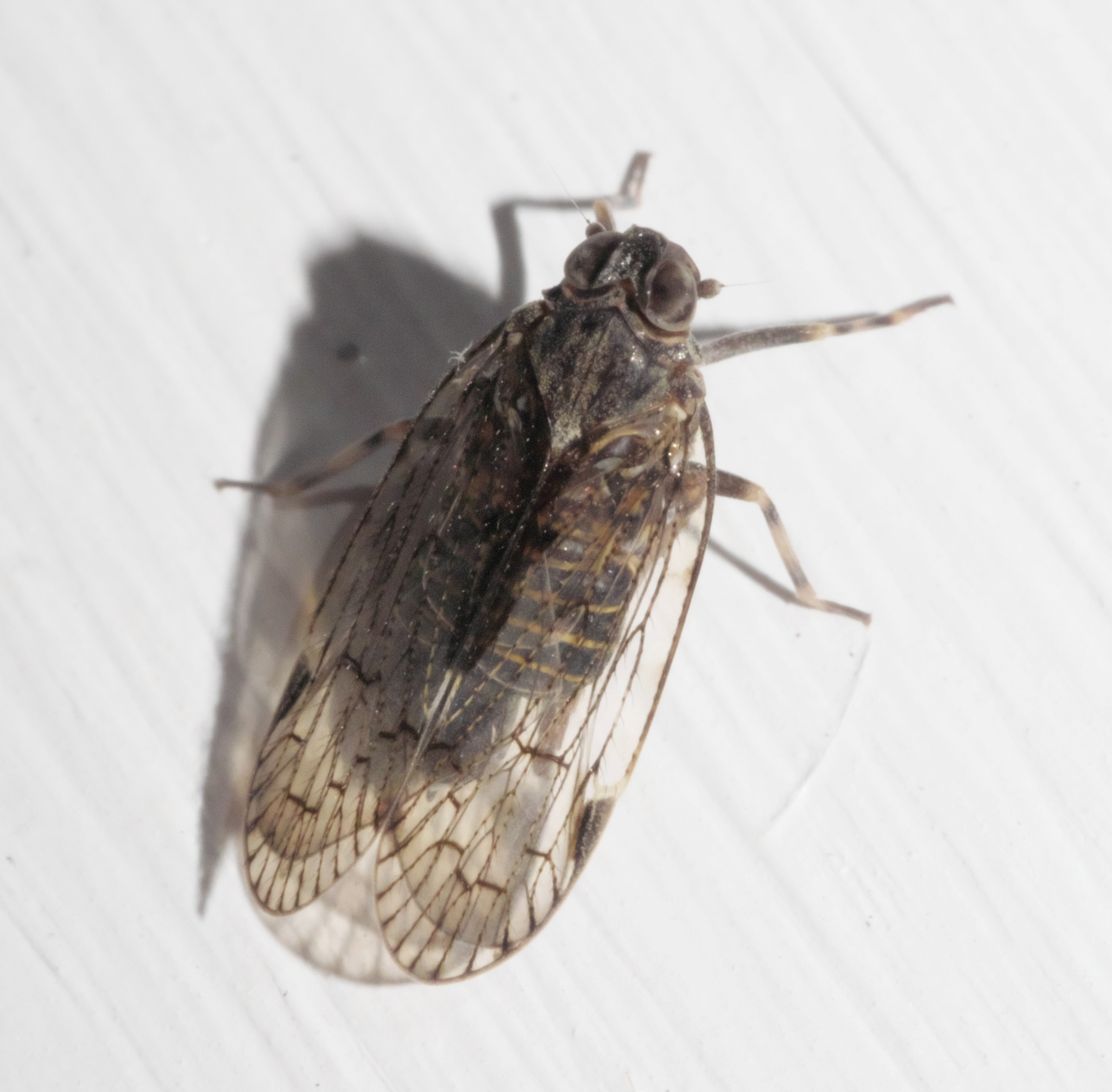
- Xenoliarus placitus, Oklahoma

Scientific classification
- Domain: Eukaryota
- Kingdom: Animalia
- Phylum: Arthropoda
- Class: Insecta
- Order: Hemiptera
- Suborder: Auchenorrhyncha
- Infraorder: Fulgoromorpha
- Family: Cixiidae
- Subfamily: Cixiinae
- Tribe: Pentastirini; Emeljanov, 1971

= Pentastirini =

Tribe of planthoppers

Pentastirini is a tribe of cixiid planthoppers in the family Cixiidae. There are more than 50 genera and 730 described species in Pentastirini, found on every continent except Antarctica.

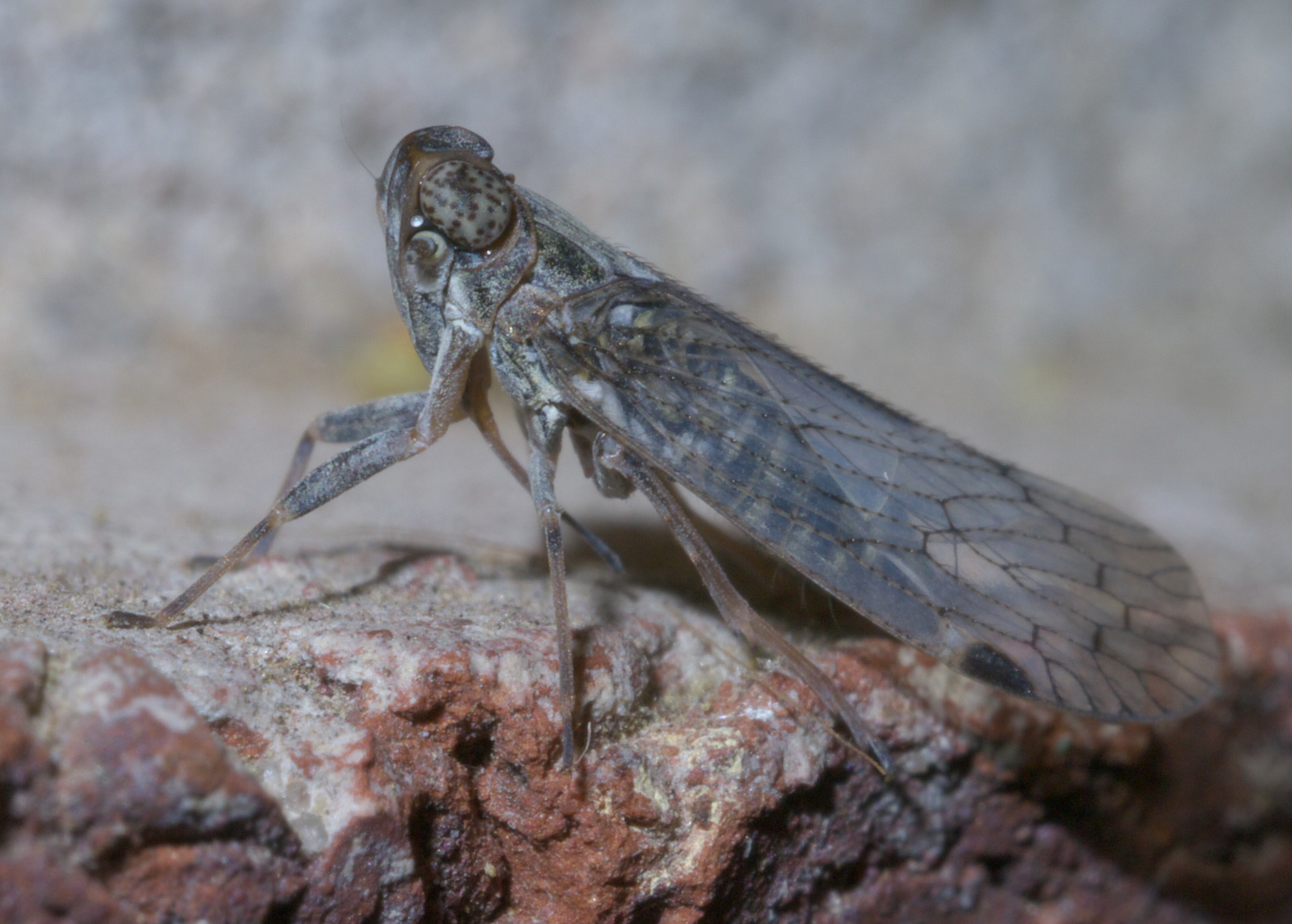
Oliaridus, Oklahoma

== Genera ==
These 59 genera belong to the tribe Pentastirini:

- Adzapala Distant, 1911
- Afroreptalus Van Stalle, 1986
- Amiarus Hendrix & Bartlett, 2025
- Anoculiarus Dlabola, 1985
- Antilliarus Hendrix & Bartlett, 2025
- Arosinus Emeljanov, 2007
- Atonurus Emeljanov, 1993
- Atretus Emeljanov, 2007
- Bifoliarus Hendrix & Bartlett, 2025
- Cilidius Hendrix & Bartlett, 2025
- Cordoliarus Löcker, 2006
- Cyclopoliarus Fennah, 1945
- Dorialus Van Stalle, 1986
- Epoliarus Matsumura, 1910
- Eumecurus Emeljanov, 1971
- Galapagoliarus Hendrix & Bartlett, 2025
- Helenolius Van Stalle, 1986
- Hyalesthes Signoret, 1865
- Indolipa Emeljanov, 2001
- Kibofascius Van Stalle, 1986
- Lalobidius Van Stalle, 1985
- Lapsium Hendrix & Bartlett, 2025
- Manurevana Hoch, 2006
- Melanoliarus Fennah, 1945
- Mesoliarus Matsumura, 1910
- Miclucha Emeljanov, 2001
- Narravertus Van Stalle, 1986
- Nesoliarus Kirkaldy, 1909
- Nivcentia Holzinger, 2004
- Norialsus Van Stalle, 1986
- Oecleopsis Emeljanov, 1971
- Oliarellus Emeljanov, 1971
- Oliaridellus Hendrix & Bartlett, 2025
- Oliaridus Hendrix & Bartlett, 2025
- Oliarissa Fennah, 1945
- Oliaronus Ball, 1934
- Oliarus Stål, 1862
- Olipa Emeljanov, 2001
- Oliparisca Emeljanov, 2001
- Oteana Hoch, 2006
- Ozoliarus Löcker, et al., 2006
- Peartolus Van Stalle, 1986
- Pentastira Kirschbaum, 1868
- Pentastiridius Kirschbaum, 1868
- Pictoliarus Hendrix & Bartlett, 2025
- Prosops Buckton, 1893
- Pseudoliarus Haupt, 1927
- Remotiarus Hendrix & Bartlett, 2025
- Reptalus Emeljanov, 1971
- Setapius Dlabola, 1988
- Siniarus Emeljanov, 2007
- Sonorium Hendrix & Bartlett, 2025
- Suriola Emeljanov, 1993
- Trirhacus Fieber, 1875
- Urvillea Kirkaldy, 1907
- Vitroliarus Hendrix & Bartlett, 2025
- Xenoliarus Hendrix & Bartlett, 2025
- Zeoliarus Larivière & Fletcher, 2008
- † Kernastiridius Szwedo, 2019
