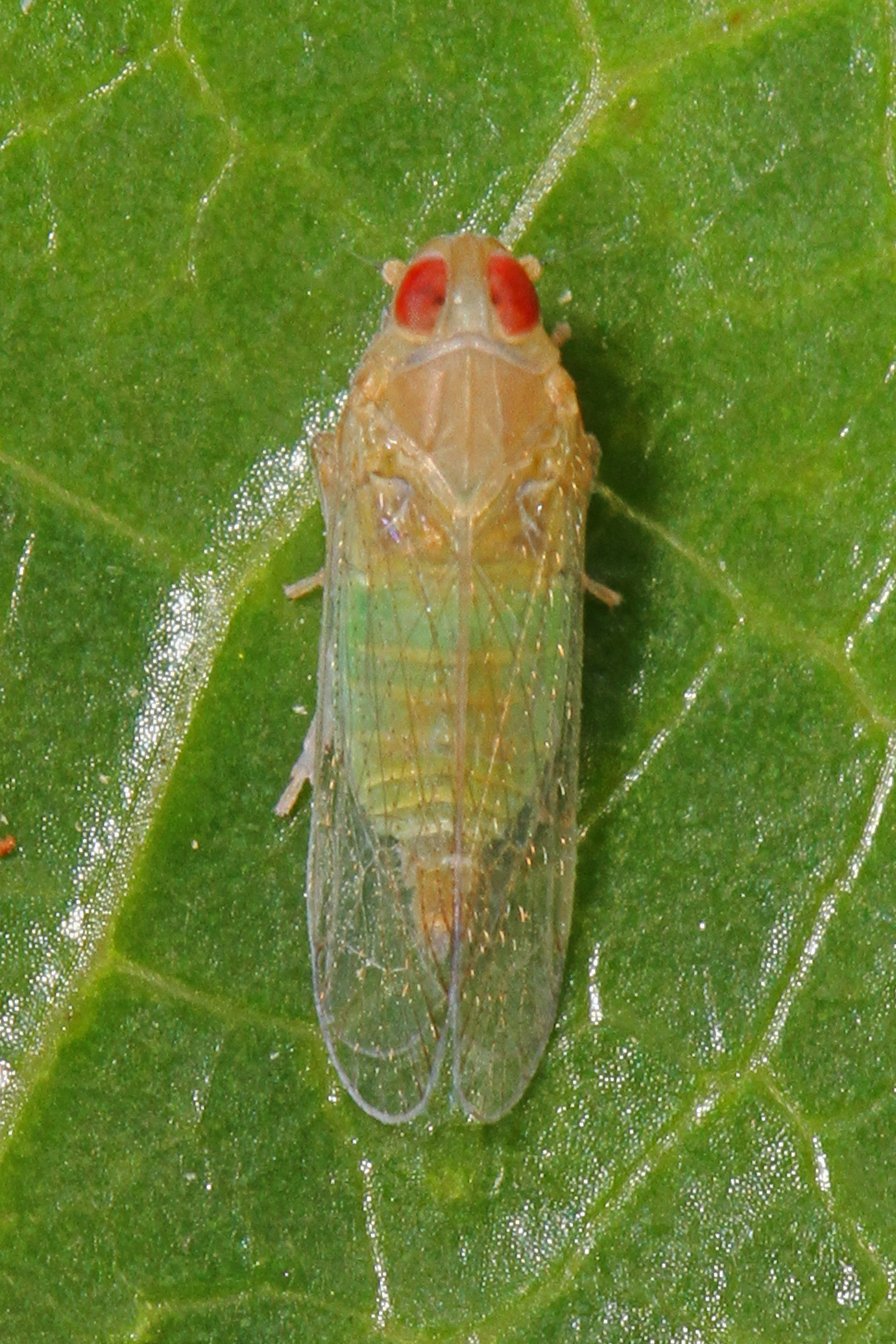
- Myndus sp.

Scientific classification
- Kingdom: Animalia
- Phylum: Arthropoda
- Clade: Pancrustacea
- Class: Insecta
- Order: Hemiptera
- Suborder: Auchenorrhyncha
- Infraorder: Fulgoromorpha
- Family: Cixiidae
- Subfamily: Cixiinae
- Tribe: Oecleini; Muir, 1922

Type genus
- Myndus Stål, 1862

Genera
- See text

= Oecleini =

Tribe of true bugs

Oecleini is a tribe of planthoppers in the subfamily Cixiinae.

== Genera ==
- Achaebana Attié Bourgoin & Bonfils, 2002
- Antillixius Myers, 1928
- Borbonomyndus Attié Bourgoin & Bonfils, 2002
- Colvanalia Muir, 1925
- Confuga Fennah, 1975
- Eumyndus Synave, 1956
- Fipsianus Holzinger, 2009
- Haplaxius Fowler, 1904
- Mundopa Distant, 1906
- Myndodus Emeljanov, 1992
- Myndus Stål, 1862
- Nesomyndus Jacobi, 1917
- Notolathrus De Remes Lenicov, 1993
- Nymphocixia Van Duzee, 1923
- Oecleus Stål, 1862
- Perindus Emeljanov, 1989
- Pinacites Emeljanov, 1972
- Proclytus Emeljanov, 2007
- Rhamphixius Fowler, 1904
- Tiriteana Myers, 1924
- Trigonocranus Fieber, 1875
- Volcanalia Distant, 1917
