= Johnstone Bennett =

American actress and vaudeville performer (1870–1906)

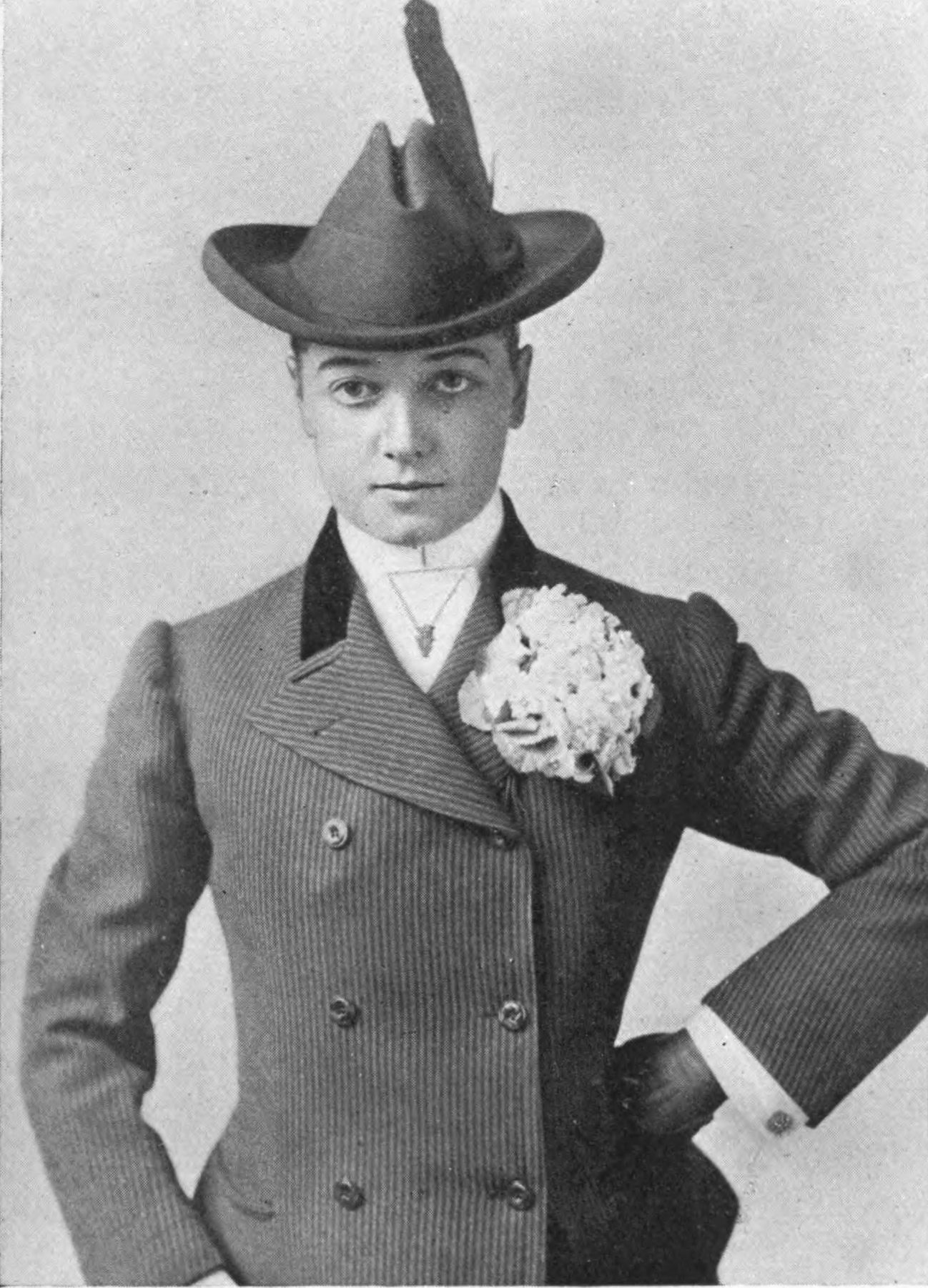
- Born: Walenton Cronise; 1870; France, Spain or at sea
- Died: April 14, 1906 (aged 36); Bloomfield, New Jersey, U.S.
- Other names: Valentine Cronise
- Occupations: Actress, vaudeville performer

Johnstone Bennett (1870 – April 14, 1906) was an American actress and vaudeville performer.

== Early life ==
Walenton (or Valentine) Cronise was possibly born in France, or Spain, or at sea (sources tell various stories), and was adopted as an infant by Mrs. Mary Bennett in the United States. When Bennett died, she was adopted again, by actress Sibyl Johnstone. She called herself "Johnstone Bennett" after the two women who raised her.

== Career ==
Johnstone Bennett was with a small touring company when she was discovered by Richard Mansfield and cast in Monsieur (1887) in Madison Square Theatre. Still with Mansfield's company, she appeared in Prince Karl (1887), Lesbia (1888), A Parisian Romance (1888), and Beau Brummell (1890). She also appeared in Honor Bright (1888), All the Comforts of a Home, A Noble Son (1889), The Story of Rodion (1895), and in starring roles of Jane (1891), The Amazon, Fanny, and A Female Drummer (1898). In vaudeville she performed in sketched titled A Quiet Evening at Home and American Types.

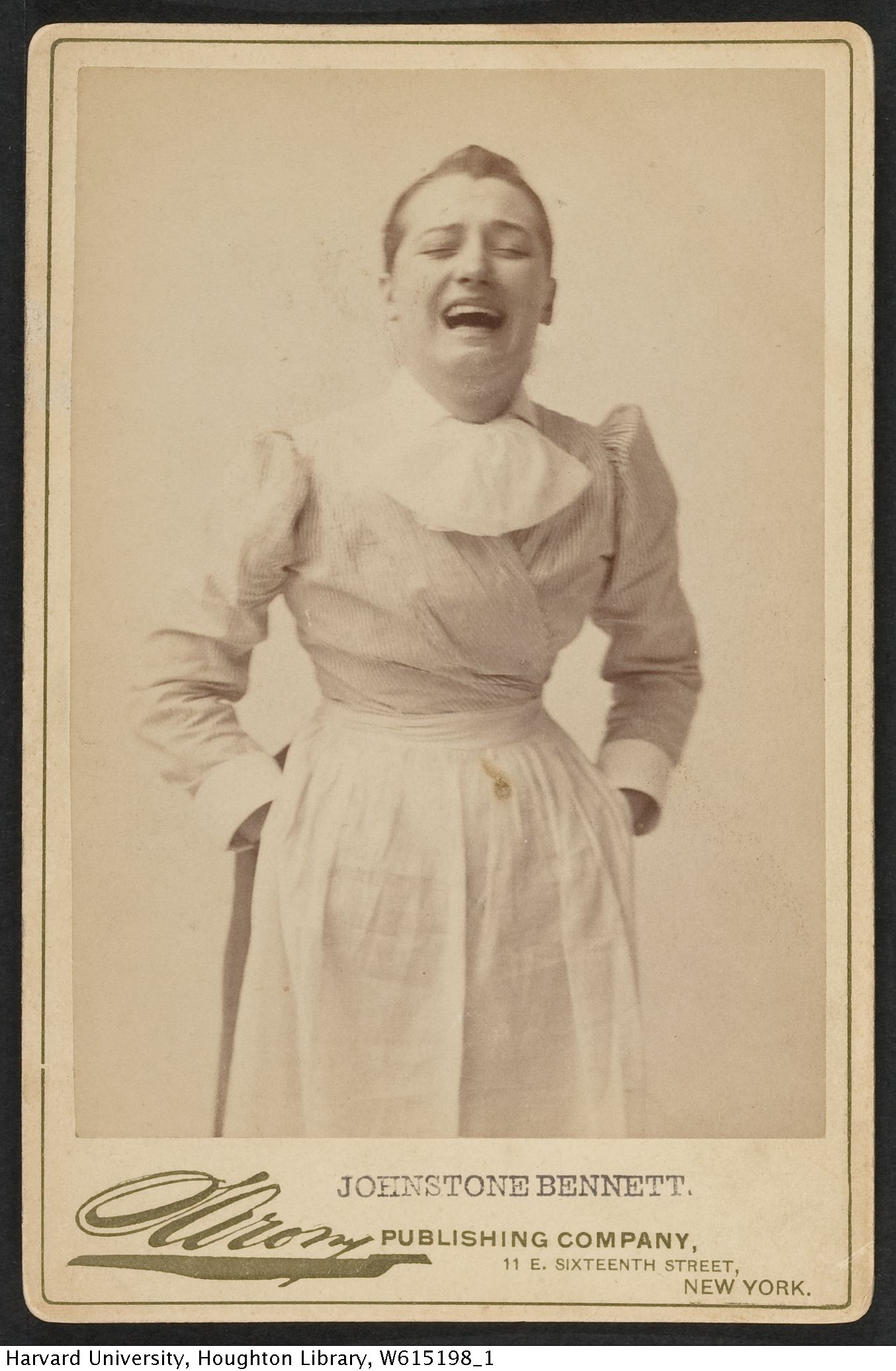
Harvard Theatre Collection –– Johnstone Bennett

Bennett wore masculine clothing and short hair, both on and off the stage. She collected cuff buttons and shirt studs, and had her skirts made with trouser-style pockets. She hired a male valet instead of a maid or press agent, and she lent her name to a haberdashery company in New York. In 1899 she caught a mouse in her dressing room, and planned to keep it for a pet.

Novelist Willa Cather described her as "jovial, natty Johnnie Bennett, a hail-fellow-well-met, and the trimmest tailor-made New Woman of them all. She is another one who has learned how to cheat time: her cheeks are just as ruddy and her big gray eyes as frank and frolicsome and boyish as they were in the days of Jane, eight or nine years ago." Theatrical manager Robert Grau remembered Bennett as "distinctly without an equal in her time."

== Personal life ==
Johnstone Bennett was destitute in her last years and survived with assistance from the Actors' Fund. She tried moving to California for her health, but it did not improve and she returned to New Jersey. She died from tuberculosis in 1906, aged 36 years, in Bloomfield, New Jersey.
