= Helene Reynard =

British economist and college administrator

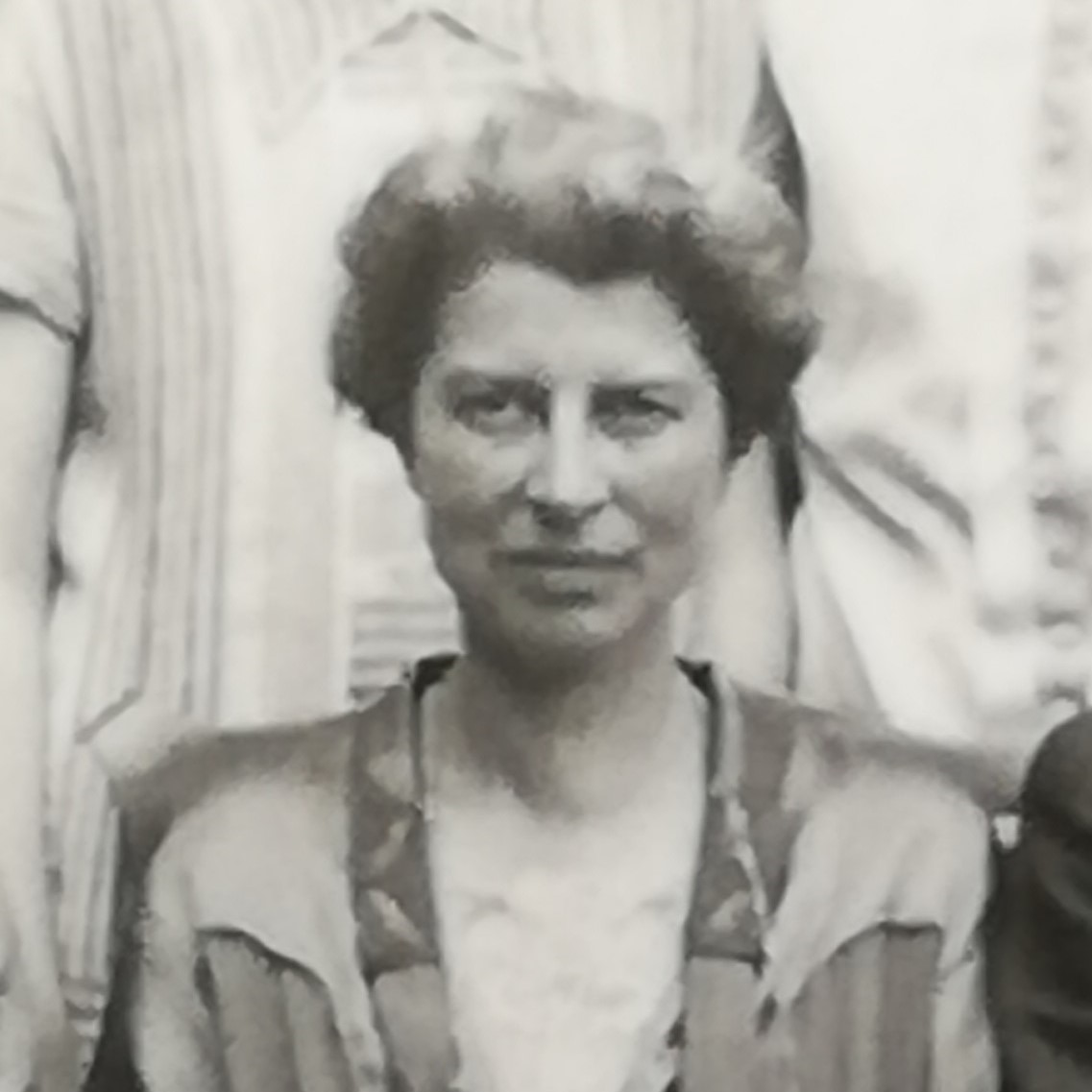
- Born: Helene Reinherz; 24 August 1875; Vienna, Austria-Hungary
- Died: 27 December 1947 (aged 72); London, United Kingdom
- Education: Girton College
- Occupation: College head
- Known for: creating and leading King's College of Household and Social Science

Helene Reynard or Helene Reinherz (24 August 1875 – 27 December 1947) was an Austrian-born British economist and college administrator. She created as a separate entity King's College of Household and Social Science in London and then ran it.

== Life ==
Reynard was born in Vienna but her family soon moved to Bradford. Her parents were Mina (born Schapira) and Marcus Reinherz and they had three children. They all moved to Yorkshire where her father owned a woollen mill. She was educated at the local Bradford Girls' Grammar School before spending four years at Girton College in Cambridge. Although she obtained second-class honours in the moral sciences tripos she was not awarded a Cambridge degree because she was not a man. She worked in London until in 1904 she returned to her alma mater where she became the junior bursar. The following year she received an MA from Trinity College, Dublin which did not discriminate against women. (Cambridge would not award degrees to women until the 1940s).

Reynard was an active supporter of Women's suffrage. She left Girton to assist the Bradford Wool Extracting Company Ltd which was her father's business but she became a joint director. In 1914, war was declared on Germany and Reynard's family decided to change their surname from Reinherz to Reynard.

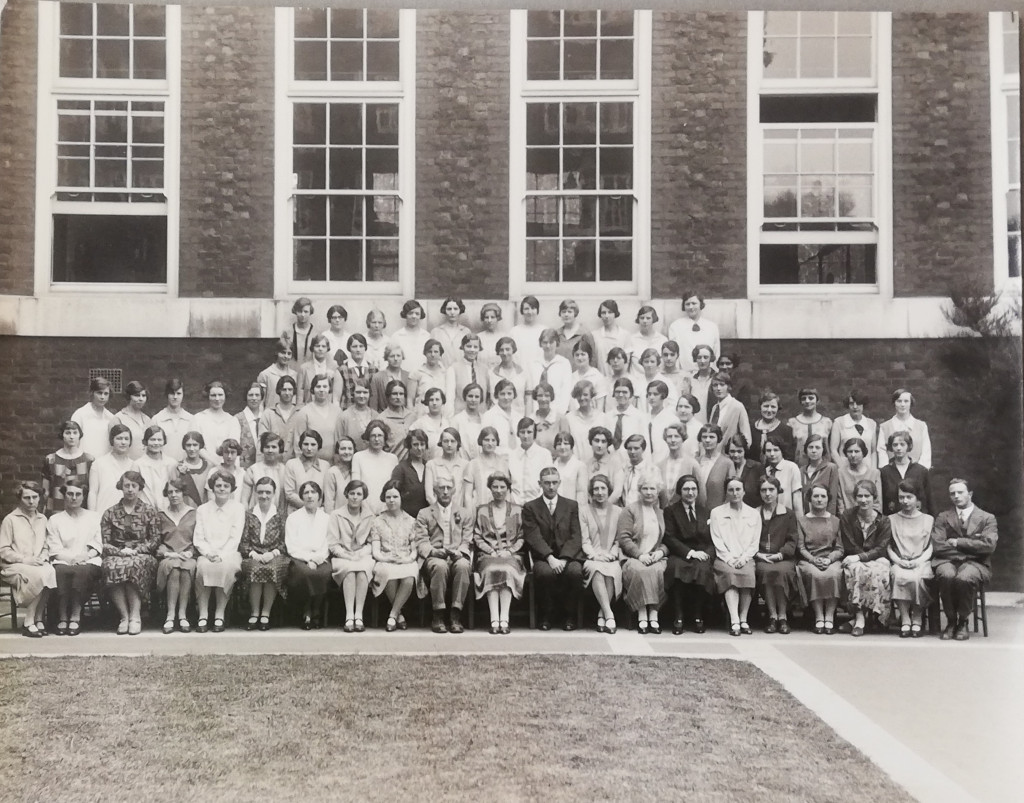
Helen Reynard, front and centre

In 1925, she was given the lead administrative position at "King's College for Women" of their "household and social science department". The plan was to create King's College of Household and Social Science and this would later be Queen Elizabeth College. The King's College of Household and Social Science was formed as an independent organisation in 1928.

On 23 March 1933, Reynard was one of the 130 (mostly women) invited to celebrate the achievement of Lady Rhondda. The dinner party was held to give Lady Rhondda a portrait by Alice Mary Burton donated by anonymous well wishers. The following year she published Institutional Management and Accounts, the year after What is a Balance Sheet?

As an administrator Reynard supported Walter Ripman's "Holiday Course" which allowed foreign students to exploit the empty accommodation and space available at Kings's during the summer vacation. Reynard as identified as a key figure in keeping this facility open and it also made additional income for the college.

Reynard was recognised for her abilities by John Maynard Keynes and he proposed that she should become a lecturer in economics.

Reynard died in 1947 in London. The same year Domestic Science as a Career was published. She had written a number of books including Book-Keeping by Easy Stages with D. Hustler.
