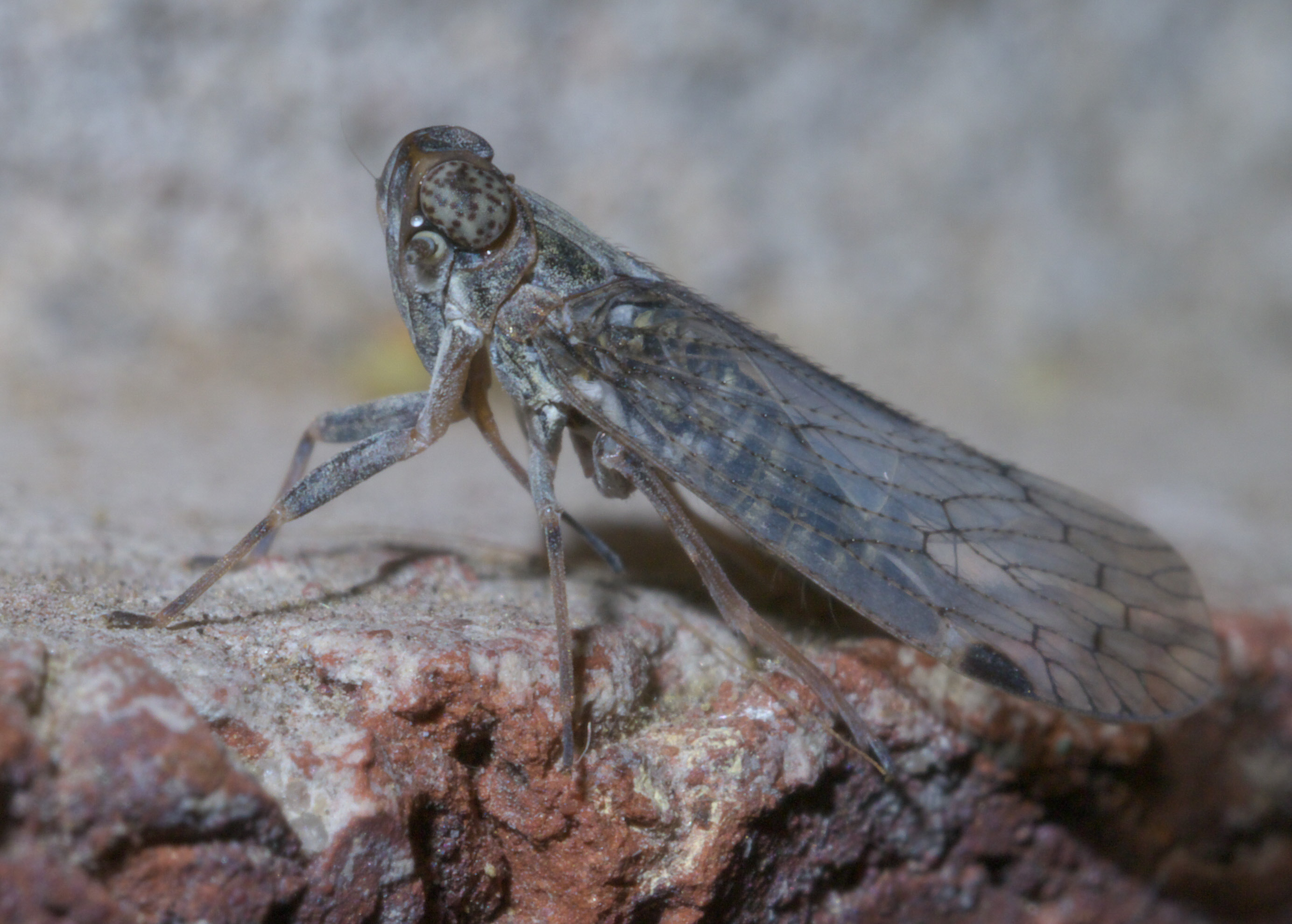

Scientific classification
- Domain: Eukaryota
- Kingdom: Animalia
- Phylum: Arthropoda
- Class: Insecta
- Order: Hemiptera
- Suborder: Auchenorrhyncha
- Infraorder: Fulgoromorpha
- Family: Cixiidae
- Tribe: Pentastirini
- Genus: Melanoliarus; Fennah, 1945

= Melanoliarus =

Genus of true bugs

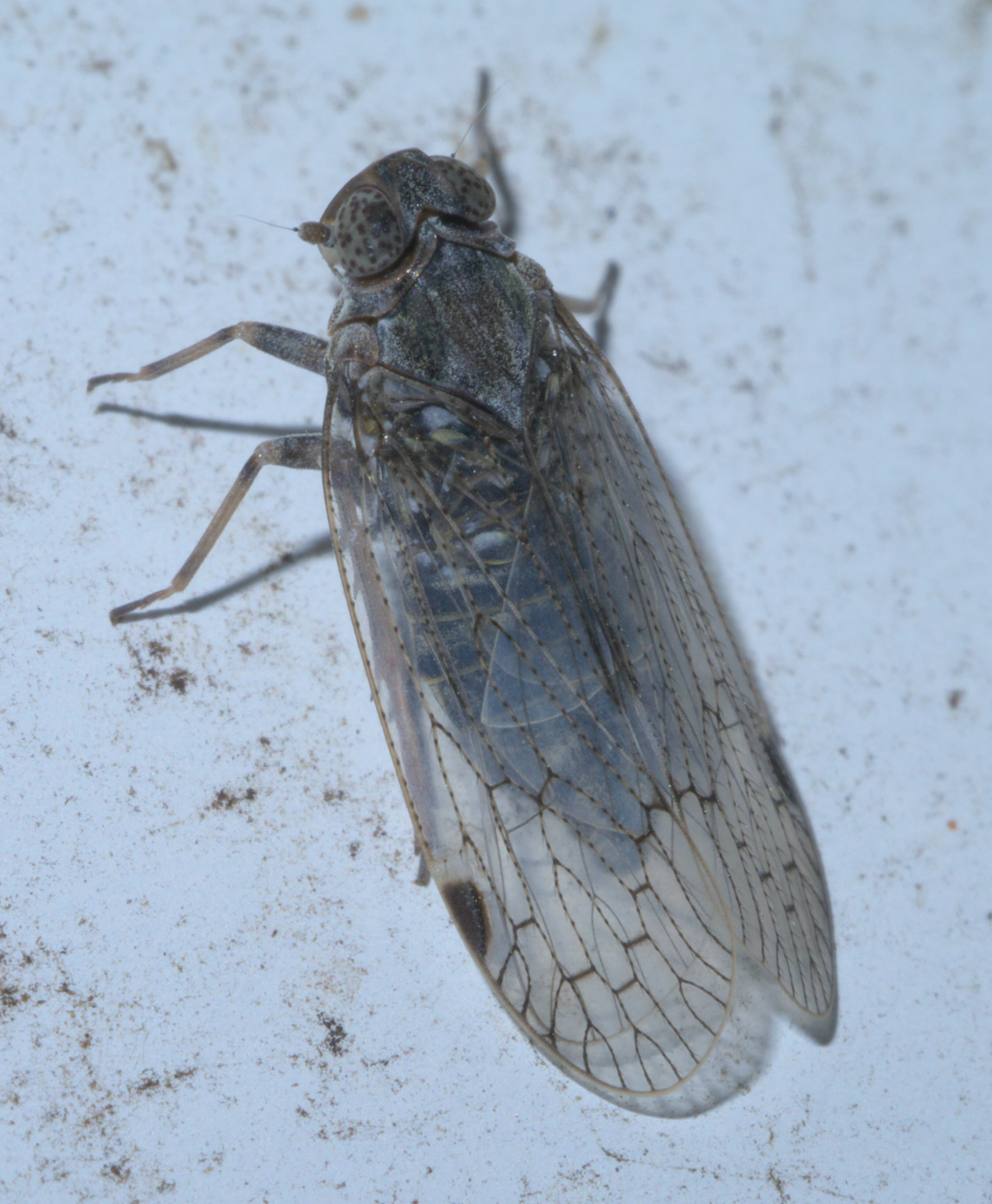

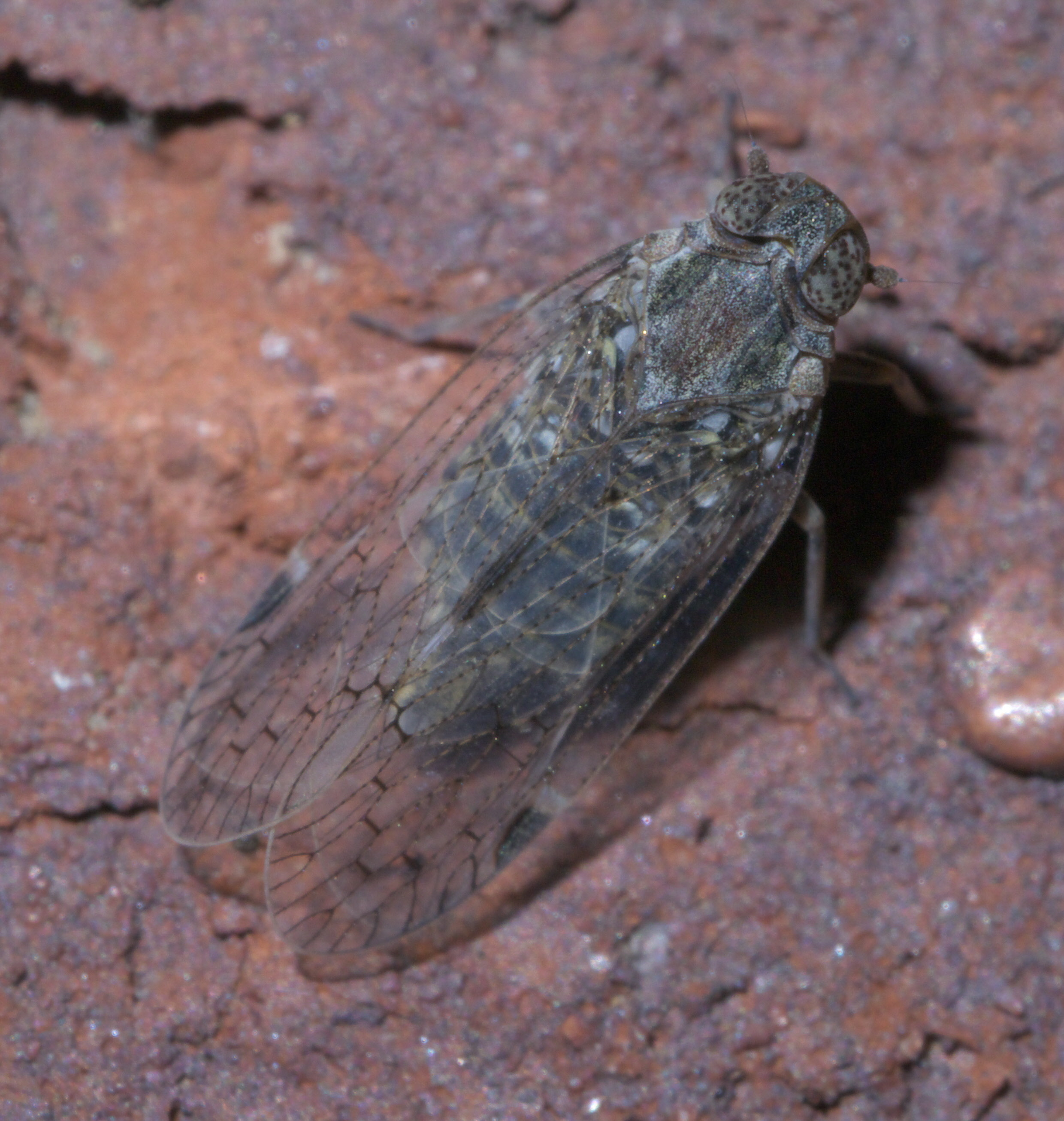

Melanoliarus is a genus of cixiid planthoppers in the family Cixiidae. There are at about 50 described species in Melanoliarus, which are common and widespread in the Nearctic and Neotropics.

The genus Melanoliarus was originally described as a subgenus of Oliarus, which had worldwide distribution. It was determined in 2001 and 2002 that species of Oliarus in the new world belonged in Melanoliarus, which was elevated to genus rank and included most of the new world species of Oliarus.

== Species ==
These 50 species belong to the genus Melanoliarus:

- Melanoliarus acicus (Caldwell, 1947)^{c g}
- Melanoliarus altanatus (Caldwell, 1951)^{c g}
- Melanoliarus altanus (Ball, 1934)^{c g}
- Melanoliarus apache (Ball, 1934)^{c g}
- Melanoliarus aridus (Ball, 1902)^{c g b}
- Melanoliarus arizonensis (Mead & Kramer, 1982)^{c g}
- Melanoliarus bispinus (Caldwell, 1947)^{c g}
- Melanoliarus caldwelli (Mead & Kramer, 1982)^{c g}
- Melanoliarus californicus (Van Duzee, 1914)^{c}
- Melanoliarus canyonensis (Mead & Kramer, 1981)^{c g}
- Melanoliarus catus (Caldwell, 1947)^{c g}
- Melanoliarus chuliotus (Ball, 1934)^{c g}
- Melanoliarus coconinus (Ball, 1934)^{c g}
- Melanoliarus complectus (Ball, 1902)^{c g}
- Melanoliarus concinnulus (Fowler, 1904)^{c g}
- Melanoliarus corvinus (Ball, 1934)^{c g}
- Melanoliarus deserticola Campodonico, 2018^{g}
- Melanoliarus difficilis (Van Duzee, 1912)^{c g}
- Melanoliarus dondonius (Ball, 1934)^{c g}
- Melanoliarus ecologus (Caldwell, 1947)^{c g}
- Melanoliarus eximus (Caldwell, 1947)^{c g}
- Melanoliarus forcipatus (Caldwell, 1947)^{c g}
- Melanoliarus franciscanus (Stal, 1859)^{c g}
- Melanoliarus hesperius (Van Duzee, 1917)^{c}
- Melanoliarus humilis (Say, 1830)^{c g b}
- Melanoliarus kieferi (Mead & Kramer, 1982)^{c g}
- Melanoliarus knullorum (Mead & Kramer, 1982)^{c g}
- Melanoliarus littoralis (Ball, 1934)^{c g}
- Melanoliarus lobatus (Caldwell, 1938)^{c g}
- Melanoliarus maidis Fennah, 1945^{c g}
- Melanoliarus montanus (Metcalf, 1923)^{c g}
- Melanoliarus papagonus (Ball, 1934)^{c g}
- Melanoliarus pima (Kirkaldy, 1907)^{c g}
- Melanoliarus placitus Van Duzee, 1912^{c g b}
- Melanoliarus pygmaeus (Ball, 1937)^{c g}
- Melanoliarus quinquelineatus (Say, 1830)^{c g}
- Melanoliarus retentus (Caldwell, 1947)^{c g}
- Melanoliarus sablenis (Caldwell, 1951)^{c g}
- Melanoliarus sementinus (Ball, 1902)^{c g}
- Melanoliarus slossonae (Van Duzee, 1912)^{c g}
- Melanoliarus sonoitus (Ball, 1937)^{c g}
- Melanoliarus sylvaticus (Caldwell, 1947)^{c g}
- Melanoliarus texanus (Metcalf, 1923)^{c}
- Melanoliarus teximus (Caldwell, 1947)^{c g}
- Melanoliarus truncatus (Van Duzee, 1929)^{c}
- Melanoliarus uncatus (Caldwell, 1947)^{c g}
- Melanoliarus vicarius (Walker, 1851)^{c g b}
- Melanoliarus viequensis (Caldwell, 1951)^{c g}
- Melanoliarus yavapanus (Ball, 1934)^{c g}
- Melanoliarus zyxus (Caldwell, 1947)^{c g}

Data sources: i = ITIS, c = Catalogue of Life, g = GBIF, b = Bugguide.net
