= Richard Davey (writer) =

English writer (1848–1911)

- Born: Richard Patrick Boyle Davey; 12 July 1848; Mileham, England
- Died: 25 November 1911 (aged 63); Venice, Italy
- Occupations: Journalist, novelist, playwright
- Spouse: Eleanor Denham (m. 1907)
- Writing career
- Language: English

Richard Patrick Boyle Davey (12 July 1848 – 25 November 1911) was an English author and journalist.

== Life ==
Davey was born on 12 July 1848 at Mileham, Norfolk, as the youngest son of Richard and Eliza Davey. After studying in France and Italy, Davey moved to New York City in 1870 and became an editor for Spirit of the Times. In 1880 he returned to England to write for The Morning Post. He also wrote for The Fortnightly Review, the National Review, The Nineteenth Century, the Saturday Review, and other publications. He wrote two historical novels and four plays. His non-fiction books include profiles of Cuba and Turkey based on his travels, and a series of books on the lives of famous women. In 1907, he married Eleanora Denman, a granddaughter of Thomas Denman, 1st Baron Denman. Davey died on 25 November 1911 in Venice, Italy.

== Works ==
=== Novels and short stories ===
- A Royal Amour, 1882
- The Sand Sea, and Other Stories, 1896
- Wetherleigh: A Romance of Hampton Court, 1897

=== Plays ===
- Paul and Virginia, 1886
- Lesbia, 1888
- L'Heritage d'Helene (with Lucy H. Hooper), 1889, performed in English under multiple titles including Helen's Inheritance and Inherited
- St. Ronan's Well, 1893
- Marion de L'Orme, 1894, adapted from the play by Victor Hugo

=== Non-fiction ===
- A History of Mourning, 1889
- Furs and Fur Garments, 1895
- The Sultan and His Subjects, 1897
- Victoria, Queen and Empress, 1897
- Cuba Past and Present, 1898
- Mary Tudor, 1898
- Historical London, 1902
- Life of Lady Jane Grey, 1902
- Lucrezia Borgia, 1903
- Botticelli, 1903
- The Pageant of London, 1906
- The Italian Renaissance, 1906
- The Nine Days' Queen, Lady Jane Grey, and Her Times, 1909
- The Tower of London, 1910
- The Sisters of Lady Jane Grey and Their Wicked Grandfather, 1911
