= The Embroideress (magazine) =

Needlework magazine published from 1922 to 1939

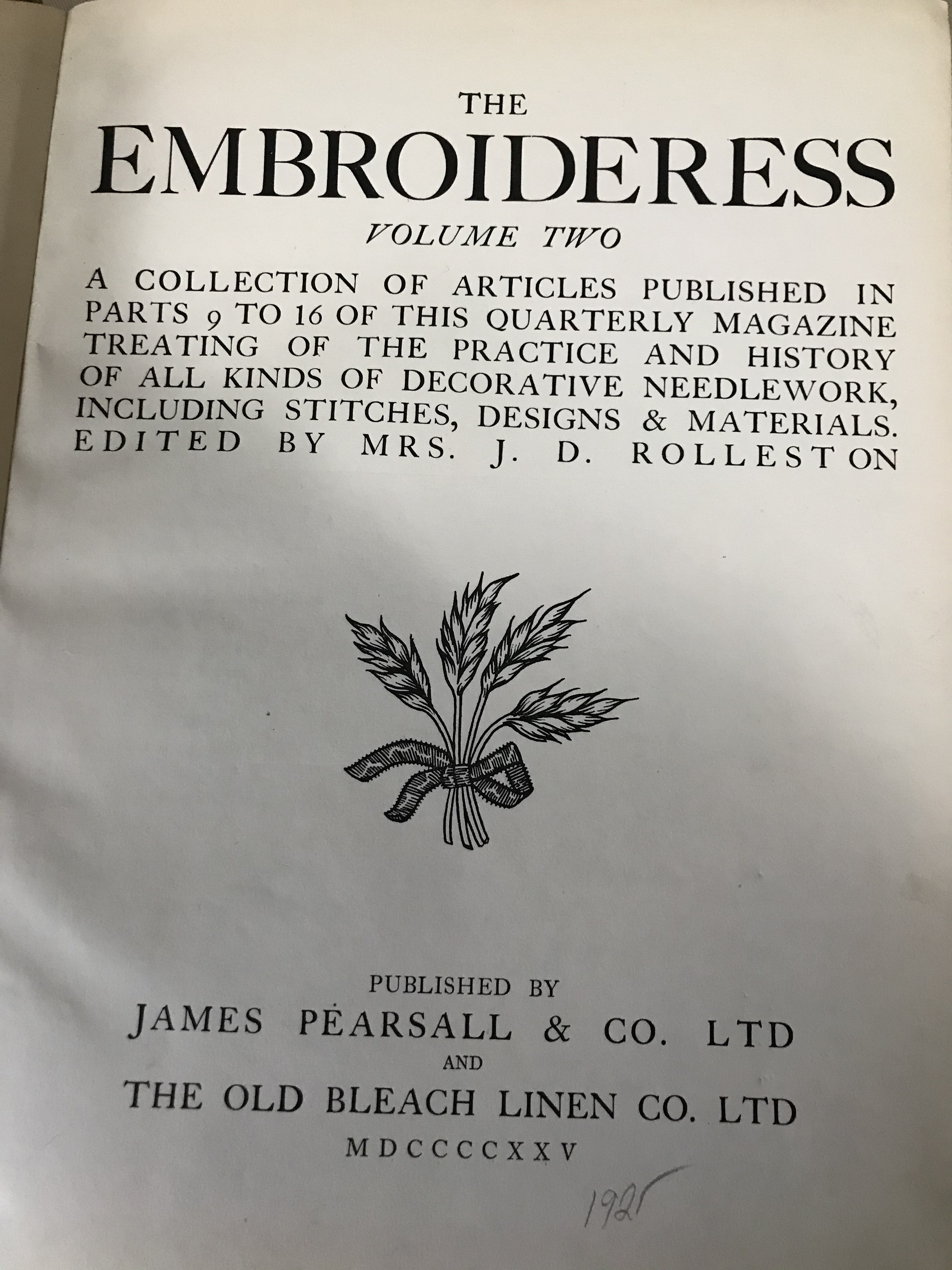
Title page of volume 2 compilation of articles from The Embroideress

The Embroideress was a quarterly magazine published by the London-based embroidery thread manufacturer Pearsall and Company and the Old Bleach Linen Company of Ireland, starting in 1922 and continuing until 1939. Issues contained a variety of types of material, including current designs, information on embroidery from different countries, articles about historical textiles or collections, and different embroidery techniques. Most illustrations were black and white, but plates were printed in color. The Embroideress also reviewed current embroidery exhibits and books on the topic. It cost 1 shilling per copy, and could be obtained by subscription. Collections of articles from spans of issues ("parts") were also published, edited by Mrs. J. D. Rolleston. For example, volume two of the collected articles was published in 1925, and included material from parts 9 to 16.

The Embroideress published articles by a new generation of embroidery teachers who were leading the way in adding modernity and personal creativity in stitching. The noted author of embroidery books Louisa Pesel was a contributor to the magazine. In issue number 9, 1924, she provided this advice: "Colour or stitchery, which is to be the more predominant? ...[W]ith elaborate technique, simple colouring or monochrome should be used, but if the colouring was polychrome the greatest simplicity and uniformity of stitch was necessary." Margaret Foster, who originated Wessex stitchery, had an article in The Embroideress issue number 50, 1934, in which she provided instructions for this technique. The noted needlewoman Ann Macbeth also had articles published in the magazine.
