= Mnemosyne (planthopper) =

Scientific classification
- Kingdom: Animalia
- Phylum: Arthropoda
- Clade: Pancrustacea
- Class: Insecta
- Order: Hemiptera
- Suborder: Auchenorrhyncha
- Infraorder: Fulgoromorpha
- Family: Cixiidae
- Subfamily: Cixiinae
- Genus: Mnemosyne; Stål, 1866

Genus of true bugs

External image
- Image at iNaturalist

Mnemosyne is a genus of planthoppers in the subfamily Cixiinae, erected by Carl Stål in 1866; it is the only extant type genus of the tribe Mnemosynini (which also contains 5 extinct genera). Species are recorded from: South America, Africa, the Indian subcontinent, SE Asia and Australia.

== Species ==
Fulgoromorpha Lists On the Web lists the following:

1. Mnemosyne alexandri Löcker, 2006
2. Mnemosyne anoriensis Van Stalle, 1987
3. Mnemosyne apicifumata Van Stalle, 1985
4. Mnemosyne araguensis Van Stalle, 1987
5. Mnemosyne arenae Fennah, 1945
6. Mnemosyne bergi Muir, 1926
7. Mnemosyne bettotana Van Stalle, 1988
8. Mnemosyne bornensis Van Stalle, 1988
9. Mnemosyne braziliensis Van Stalle, 1987
10. Mnemosyne camerunensis Distant, 1907
11. Mnemosyne cixioides (Spinola, 1852)
12. Mnemosyne colombiae (Walker, 1851)
13. Mnemosyne comata Löcker, 2006
14. Mnemosyne consoleae Van Stalle, 1987
15. Mnemosyne cubana Stål, 1866 - type species
16. Mnemosyne dohertyi Distant, 1907
17. Mnemosyne dominicensis Van Stalle, 1987
18. Mnemosyne ecuadorana Van Stalle, 1987
19. Mnemosyne efferata (Walker, 1857)
20. Mnemosyne evansi Muir, 1923
21. Mnemosyne fasciata Van Stalle, 1987
22. Mnemosyne ferrea (Walker, 1857)
23. Mnemosyne flavicollis Van Stalle, 1987
24. Mnemosyne frontistriata Van Stalle, 1987
25. Mnemosyne fuscinervis Muir, 1926
26. Mnemosyne granulata Van Stalle, 1987
27. Mnemosyne hirata Melichar, 1904
28. Mnemosyne hirta (Melichar, 1904)
29. Mnemosyne kedaha Van Stalle, 1988
30. Mnemosyne kutariensis Van Stalle, 1987
31. Mnemosyne lamabokensis Synave, 1979
32. Mnemosyne laticara Van Stalle, 1988 (Vietnam)
33. Mnemosyne lefiniensis Van Stalle, 1985
34. Mnemosyne levata Van Stalle, 1988
35. Mnemosyne mabarumensis Van Stalle, 1987
36. Mnemosyne musca (Breddin, 1905)
37. Mnemosyne oblongostriata Van Stalle, 1987
38. Mnemosyne ophirensis Van Stalle, 1988
39. Mnemosyne pahangensis Van Stalle, 1988
40. Mnemosyne perakensis Van Stalle, 1988
41. Mnemosyne pernambucoensis Van Stalle, 1987
42. Mnemosyne philippina Stål, 1870
43. Mnemosyne planiceps (Fabricius, 1803)
44. Mnemosyne pseudofasciata Van Stalle, 1987
45. Mnemosyne punctipennis (Distant, 1906)
46. Mnemosyne simula Van Stalle, 1988
47. Mnemosyne sulawesiensis Van Stalle, 1988
48. Mnemosyne tenensis Van Stalle, 1987
49. Mnemosyne vegensis Van Stalle, 1987
