= Bradford Girls' Grammar School =

Bradford Girls' Grammar School (BGGS)
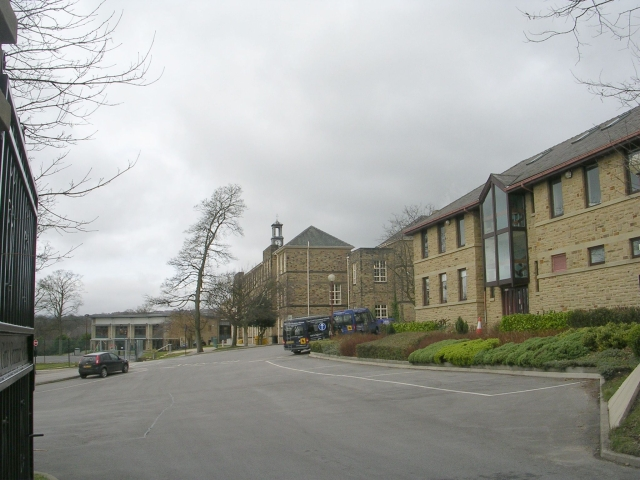

Location
- Squire Lane; Bradford, West Yorkshire, BD9 6RB; England; 53.8038°N 1.7965°W

Information
- Type: Free school
- Motto: Aspire. Succeed. Lead
- Established: 1875
- Department for Education URN: 140204 Tables
- Ofsted: Reports
- Principal: Caroline Foster
- Gender: Girls only 11-16 yrs
- Age: 11 to 16
- Enrolment: 678 (as of 2024)
- Houses: Castle, Nightingale, Tomlinson, Bronte, Vickridge
- Colours: Navy, Black, Yellow
- Website: www.bggs.com

Bradford Girls' Grammar School is a free school for girls aged 5 – 16 and boys aged 5 – 11. Founded in 1875, the school is on the outskirts of Bradford city centre in West Yorkshire, England. Recent public examination results put the school top in Bradford and among the top three in Yorkshire. Bradford Girls has a debating society, which Barbara Castle attended when at the school.

Previously a Direct Grant Grammar School, then a private school, it became a free school in 2013, and no longer charges for admission.

An outline history of the school, with photographs, is available on the BGGS website. For many years, the school publication was known as The Chronicle. The school celebrated its centenary in 1975.

== Head teachers ==
- Miss Porter, Headmistress from 1875
- Miss Stocker
- Miss Roberts, 1894–1927
- Miss Hooke, 1927–1955
- Miss M.M. Black, 1955–1975
- Miss R.M. Gleave, 1975–1986
- Mrs L. Warrington, 1986–2009
- Mrs Kathryn Matthews, 2009–2020
- Mrs Clare Martin, 2020-2024
- Mrs Caroline Foster, 2024–current

== Notable former pupils ==
- Juliet Barker, British historian.
- Linda Barker, English interior designer and television presenter.
- Marion Bidder, British physiologist.
- Barbara Castle, Baroness Castle of Blackburn (1910-2002), British Labour Party politician.
- Thangam Debbonaire, British Labour Party politician.
- Elizabeth Denby (1894–1965), English social housing expert and consultant.
- Anne Dyer, first female bishop in the Scottish Episcopal Church.
- Ruby Ferguson (1899–1966), née Rubie Constance Ashby, writer of popular fiction, including children's books.
- Isabel Hilton, journalist.
- Jennifer Ingleheart, Professor of Latin at Durham University.
- Melanie Kilburn, English actress.
- Natalia Kills, English singer-songwriter.
- Julia Longbottom, diplomat.
- Lizzie Mickery, British writer and former actress
- Dorothy Miell, academic
- Louisa Pesel, embroiderer, educator and textile collector.
- Anita Rani, English radio and television presenter, and journalist.
- Helene Reynard, Economist and college administrator.
- Jo Shaw, legal scholar
- Mary Tamm, Actress.
- Anna Watts, astrophysicist.
