= Jennifer Ingleheart =

British classical scholar

Professor Jennifer Ingleheart
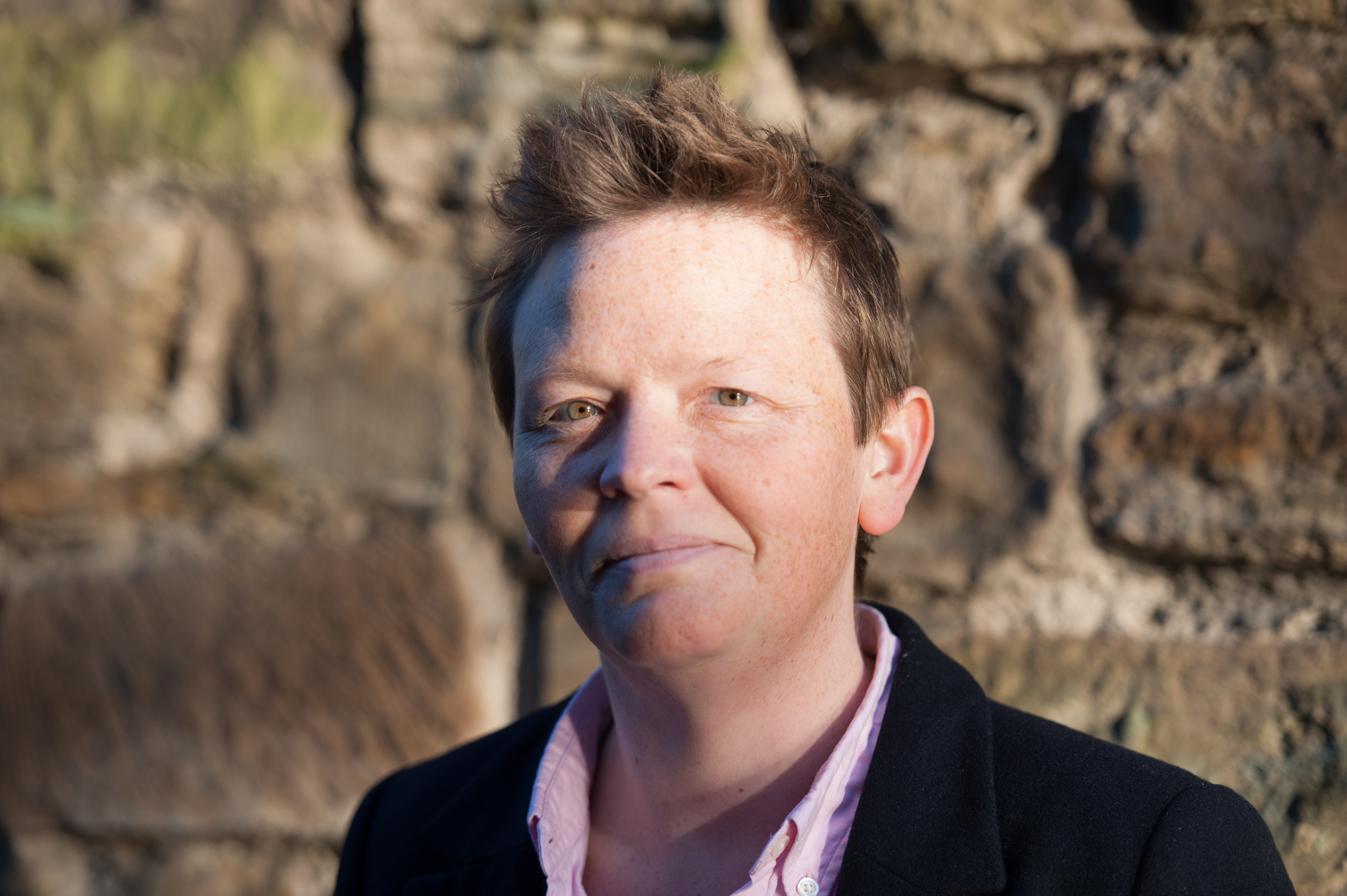
- Professor Jennifer Ingleheart

Academic background
- Education: Wadham College, Oxford
- Thesis: A commentary on Ovid Tristia 2.1-262
- Doctoral advisor: Stephen Heyworth, Adrian Hollis

Academic work
- Discipline: Classics
- Sub-discipline: Latin Literature; Classical reception studies
- Institutions: University of Durham
- Notable works: A Commentary on Ovid, Tristia, Book 2 Ancient Rome and the Construction of Modern Homosexual Identities

Jennifer Ingleheart is a British classical scholar, who is known for her work on Ovid, Classical reception, and the influence of Rome on the modern understanding of homosexuality. She is Professor of Latin at the University of Durham.

== Career ==
Ingleheart was educated at Bradford Girls' Grammar School and Wadham College, Oxford.

Ingleheart read Literae Humaniores at Wadham College, and went on to complete her M.St. and D.Phil. there in 2004 on Ovid's Tristia, which was published in 2010. After teaching at Marlboro College, Vermont, Swansea University, and Keble and Wadham Colleges in Oxford, she joined Durham University as a lecturer in 2004 before becoming senior lecturer in 2012, associate professor and then Professor of Latin. Ingleheart is now head of the Department of Classics and Ancient History.

Ingleheart has spoken frequently about her work on how modern cultures have responded to the phenomenon of Roman homosexuality, and the role which ancient Rome has played in modern ideas about sexuality. She ran a major British Academy funded conference in 2012, Romosexuality, on the subject which has shed considerable light on the differences between Roman and Greek conceptions of homosexuality, and differences from modern conceptions. Previously most work on classical homosexuality focused on Greek homosexuality and its modern reception, but Ingleheart's work has facilitated new research and interest in the Roman experience. The modern reception of Roman homosexuality in particular has led to Ingleheart's current work on, and translation of, AE Housman's Praefanda, a study of classical sexuality in Latin.

== Television ==
- Ovid: The Poet and the Emperor BBC 4 (2017 documentary presented by Michael Wood)

== Select publications ==
- Masculine Plural: Queer Classics, Sex, and Education (Oxford University Press 2018)
- Ancient Rome and the Construction of Modern Homosexual Identities (Oxford University Press 2015)
- "Ovid's scripta puella: Perilla as poetic and political fiction in Tristia 3.71." The Classical Quarterly 62, no. 1 (2012): 227–41.
- (ed.) Two Thousand Years of Solitude: Exile After Ovid (Oxford University Press 2011)
- A Commentary on Ovid, Tristia, Book 2 (Oxford University Press 2010)
- "Propertius 4.10 and the end of the Aeneid: Augustus, the spolia opima and the right to remain silent." Greece and Rome 54, no. 1 (2007): 61–81.
- "What the Poet Saw: Ovid, the Error and the Theme of Sight in Tristia 2." Materiali E Discussioni per L'analisi Dei Testi Classici, no. 56 (2006): 63–86.
- "Ovid Tristia 1.2: High Drama on the High Seas." Greece and Rome 53, no. 1 (2006): 73–91.
- "Catullus 2 And 3: A programmatic pair of Sapphic epigrams?" Mnemosyne 56, no. 5 (2003): 551–65.
