= Mnemosyne (journal) =

- Discipline: Classics
- Language: English, French, German, Latin

Publication details
- History: 1852–present
- Publisher: Brill Publishers
- Frequency: 10/year

Standard abbreviations
- ISO 4: Mnemosyne

Indexing
- ISSN: 0026-7074 (print); 1568-525X (web)
- LCCN: 06031463
- OCLC no.: 01189611

Links
- Journal homepage

Mnemosyne is an academic journal of classical studies published by Brill Publishers. It was established in 1852 as a journal of textual criticism. It publishes articles mainly in English, but also in French, German, and Latin. The journal is abstracted and indexed in the Arts and Humanities Citation Index, Current Contents, and MLA International Bibliography.
