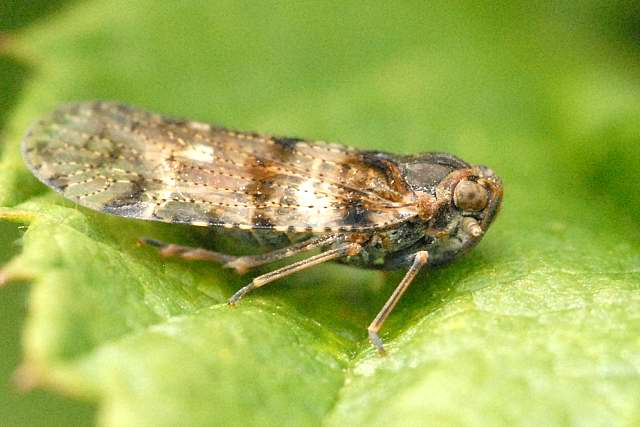
- Cixius nervosus

Scientific classification
- Domain: Eukaryota
- Kingdom: Animalia
- Phylum: Arthropoda
- Class: Insecta
- Order: Hemiptera
- Suborder: Auchenorrhyncha
- Infraorder: Fulgoromorpha
- Family: Cixiidae
- Subfamily: Cixiinae; Spinola, 1839

Tribes
- See text

= Cixiinae =

Subfamily of true bugs

Cixiinae is a planthopper subfamily in the family Cixiidae. It is one of three such subfamilies, the other two being the Bothriocerinae and the Borystheninae. While a few species had been tested in a larger study of the Fulgoroidea, neither the Cixiinae nor its tribes were analysed cladistically until 2002. Resolution of tribal relationships is incomplete and additional testing of the tribes with samples larger than one per tribe is needed.

== Tribes ==
In 1938 Metcalf divided the Cixiinae into tribes, including the Cixiini and Oecleini of Muir; however, those divisions were seldom referred to and remained unanalysed for decades. Subsequently, the Stenophlepsiini were returned to the Cixiinae, and the Pentastirini were subdivided into the Pentastirina and Oliarina subtribes. However, Oliarina was later synonymized under Pentastirina. In 2002, Emeljanov created seven new tribes and in 2004 subtribe Mnemosynina of tribe Pentastirini was raised to tribal level as the Mnemosynini.

Currently there are sixteen recognized tribes, although some tribes lack adequate description:

- Andini Emeljanov, 2002
- Bennarellini Emeljanov, 1989
- Bennini Metcalf, 1938
- Brixidiini Emeljanov, 2002
- Brixiini Emeljanov, 2002
- Cajetini Emeljanov, 2002
- Cixiini Muir, 1923 - non-monophyletic
- Duiliini Emeljanov, 2002
- Eucarpiini Emeljanov, 2002 - monophyletic
- Gelastocephalini Emeljanov, 2000 - putatively monophyletic
- Mnemosynini Szwedo, 2004 - one extant genus Mnemosyne (planthopper) Stål, 1866 (5 extinct)
- Oecleini Muir, 1922 - non-monophyletic
- Pentastirini Emeljanov, 1971 - monophyletic
- Pintaliini Metcalf, 1938 - non-monophyletic
- Semonini Emeljanov, 2002 - putatively monophyletic
- Stenophlepsiini Metcalf, 1938
