= Texas phoenix palm decline =

Palm tree disease

- Common names: TPPD
- Causal agents: Candidatus Phytoplasma palmae
- Hosts: Phoenix
- Vectors: suspected carriers: Planthoppers, psyllids or treehoppers
- Distribution: Florida and Texas

Texas Phoenix palm decline, or lethal bronzing, is a plant disease caused by a phytoplasma, Candidatus Phytoplasma palmae. It takes its name from the state it was first identified in and the palm genus, Phoenix, upon which it was first identified. It is currently found in parts of Florida and Texas.

The TPPD strain is classified as group 16SrIV, subgroup D (16SrIV-D) and LY:16SrIV-A.

Several palms susceptible to the phytoplasma have been documented, including: Phoenix canariensis, Phoenix dactylifera, Phoenix sylvestris, Phoenix reclinata, Sabal palmetto, and Syagrus romanzoffiana. Prior to 2006, lethal yellowing was the only other strain of phytoplasma known to attack palm trees in Florida. The introduction of this disease has left the state of Florida struggling to control the potential damage to palm trees in landscapes statewide.

== Symptoms ==
It has been observed to almost exclusively attack the Canary Island palm, but is seen on other species. Since 2009, Texas Phoenix palm disease is known to severely affect the Phoenix spp. and Sabal spp. palm trees: Canary Island date palm, silver or sylvester date palm, queen palm, Sabal palm, and cabbage palm. All of these trees have been observed to have the same symptoms. The complete host range of this phytoplasma strain is not known.

If the palm tree is mature enough to produce fruit, it will experience two major symptoms. Premature drop of the majority or all of the fruit, within a short time period (about three days), is an obvious symptom. Soon after this, the flowers become necrotic. However, these symptoms can only be observed during flowering and fruiting season, and if the flowers have not been trimmed from the tree.

At any palm age, early infection will show discoloration of the foliage, starting at the tips of the oldest leaves. The leaf colors change from the normal green to different shades of reddish-brown, to dark brown. Declining palm trees are characterized by a large number of discolored leaves in the lower and mid-crown region of the tree.

When about a third of the oldest leaves become discolored, the spear leaf will die, displaying a tan, rather than green color. The spear leaf is the youngest leaf, generally seen in the center of the canopy. In obvious situations, the dead spear life can be seen hanging down or broken off of the canopy. This indicates that the apical meristem is dead and there will be no new leaf production or growth. In most cases, without close examination, the spear leaf will not be easy to find or observe if it is still alive. Occasionally, when the spear leaf dies, some palms experience root rot. This is a major symptom that differentiates TPPD from lethal yellowing, since LY does not experience root decay.

== Diagnostics ==
A large issue with controlling this disease is that it is difficult to diagnose. The early symptoms may appear to be the cause of 'over-trimming' of the leaves or nutrient deficiency. The progression of the symptoms is from the inside of the tree, out and are not immediate.

The death of the spear leaf indicates the death of the apical meristem, which is diagnostic for a phytoplasma infection.

Since phytoplasmas are not culturable, a molecular test can be done to confirm its presence. A sample must be sent to a local extension office for testing. To acquire a sample, boring into the trunk must be done with a drill. It is not known how soon the TPPD phytoplasma can be detected from this test, but it is generally not seen in plants without symptoms. Other times, it is not detectable until the spear leaf dies.

== Disease cycle ==
The specific disease cycle for TPPD is not known, since the vector is unidentified. Planthoppers, psyllids, or treehoppers are the suspected carriers. For this reason, a general disease cycle of mollicutes by related insect vectors is described as the cycle for TPPD.

Phytoplasmas colonize in the phloem tissue of their hosts. This allows the pathogen to spread systemically through the vascular system into new leaves of the plant. Since phytoplasmas are not known to survive without their host (plant or insect), the process of the overwintering (unfavorable conditions) stage is unknown. The exact spot in the cycle where the spear leaf dies is not absolute, but it is thought to be early in the disease process.

When a healthy insect vector feeds by piercing the vein of a leaf and sucking the phloem sap, the pathogen is ingested into the gut of the insect. Before the infection can be spread from plant to plant, an incubation period is needed for distribution throughout the insect. Once the phytoplasma is ingested from the plant, it multiplies in the gut of the insect, travels into the hemolymph, then to the salivary glands. Here, in high enough concentrations, the phytoplasma is transmitted into new plants when the insect feeds.

== Environment ==
The only area this disease in known to infect is the southern coastal regions of Texas and Florida. It is not known how the phytoplasma reached Florida, but it is likely it was brought over from an unknown insect vector since movement of palms from the Texas coast to Florida is not routine. It is not known whether this phytoplasma prefers the climate of these coastal regions or a specific host. As of now, the only hosts known to carry this disease are a range of palm species.

To favor development, the area of infection must have a high population of insect vectors (planthoppers, psyllids, or treehoppers) for continuous, successful transmission. Rate of replication depends on the parameter of the incubation period. Depending on the insect vector and temperature, it could be anywhere between 10 (at 30°) and 45 (at 10°) days. The concentration of phytoplasmas, at the salivary glands of the insect vector after incubation period, also varies transmission. The concentration must meet a certain level before the insect transfers the infection into new plants.

== Management ==
There are two main methods of control for Texas Phoenix palm decline: Removal of dead spear leaves of the palm tree and the application of an antibiotic called oxytetracycline HCl (OTC).

If the spear leaf dies, there are healthy leaves beneath them, and the control method of implementing the removal of dead spear leaves is to be used. Unless the removal of these dead spear leaves occurs, this gives a chance for the vector to use these diseased spear leaves and transmit the disease to other nearby susceptible palm trees.

If the spear leaf has not yet been killed by TPPD, antibiotics are added to afflicted palm trees by injecting it into the trunk of the tree. These applications have a liquid composition. They are applied either when the plant is expressing symptoms of TPPD or as a source of protecting known susceptible palm species from ever acquiring the disease. This antibiotic cannot be used on just any palm species. It should rather be used only on prone species palm to TPPD. Over the course of four months these antibiotics will be integrated, if used.

Future implications that have not been stable in terms of success or effectiveness, but that still hold promise are discovery of resistant strains of palm or control of vector population. These are not used however due to not knowing the complete known palms TPPD effects and the vector not being totally known either.

== Importance ==
Texas Phoenix palm decline is classified as a systemic disease and it is known to rapidly kill its hosts. Although it is dispersed around by vectors, at this time it is still unknown as to which what specific vectors exactly are carrying and spreading this disease. The palm disease TPPD has no known cure. In response to the disease outbreak in Texas, namely, quarantines have been set up for various counties (Nueces, Hidalgo, Cameron, Willacy, and various portions of Kleberg county as well). Even more drastic measures have been implemented in Florida, as the entire state is under quarantine for Texas Phoenix palm decline.

There is large concern for the destruction of the Sabal palm. Given its native status to Florida, its loss could suffer severe consequences to the local ecosystem if there is no reliable management soon.
