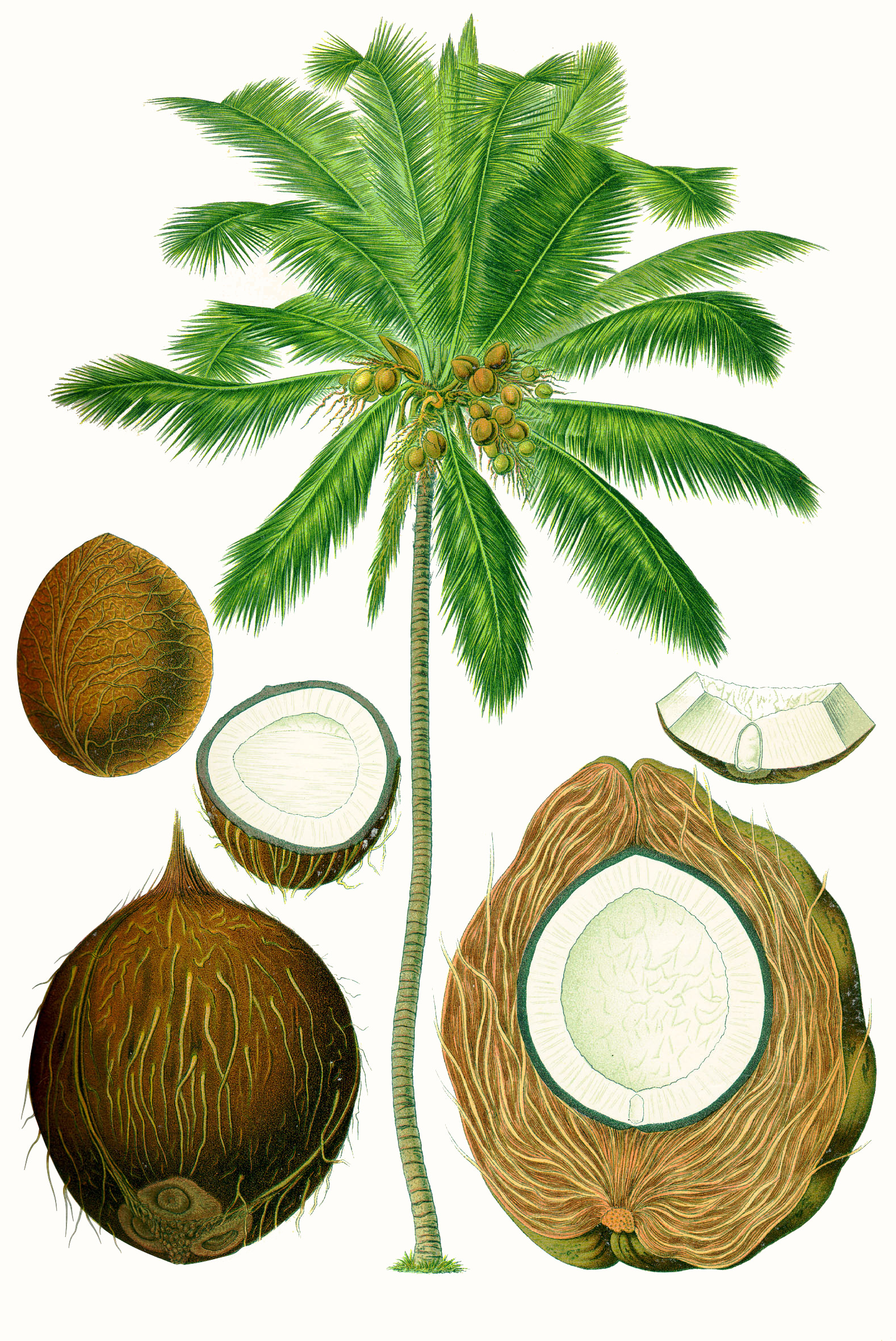

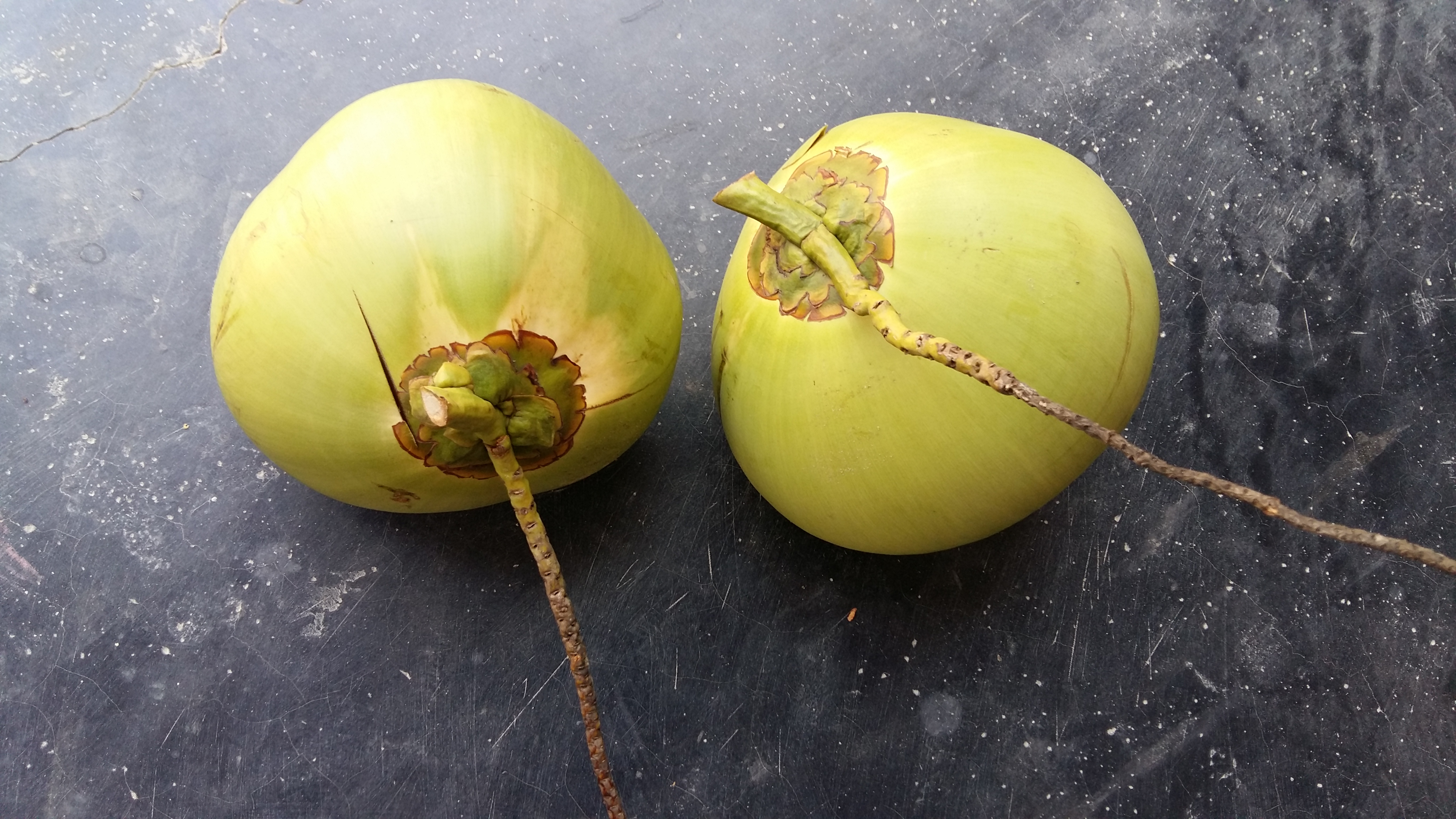

Scientific classification
- Kingdom: Plantae
- Clade: Tracheophytes
- Clade: Angiosperms
- Clade: Monocots
- Clade: Commelinids
- Order: Arecales
- Family: Arecaceae
- Subfamily: Arecoideae
- Tribe: Cocoseae
- Subtribe: Attaleinae
- Genus: Cocos; L.
- Species: C. nucifera

Binomial name
- Cocos nucifera L.

Synonyms
- Coccus Mill.; Calappa Steck; Coccos Gaertn.

= Coconut =

Coconut Temporal range: 55–0 Ma Early Eocene – Recent

Species of plant in the palm family

The coconut (Cocos nucifera) is a member of the palm family (Arecaceae) and the only living species of the genus Cocos. The term "coconut" (or the archaic "cocoanut") can denote the whole coconut palm tree or the large hard fruit. Originally native to the Southeast Asia, New Guinea, and the Southwestern Pacific, they are ubiquitous in coastal tropical regions.

The coconut tree provides food, fuel, cosmetics, folk medicine, and building materials. The inner flesh of the mature fruit forms a regular part of the diets of many people in the tropics and subtropics. Coconut endosperm contains a large quantity of a liquid, "coconut water". Mature coconuts can be processed for oil and coconut milk from the flesh, charcoal from the hard shell, and coir from the fibrous husk. Dried coconut flesh is called copra, and the oil and milk derived from it are commonly used in cooking and in soaps and cosmetics. Sweet coconut sap can be made into drinks or fermented into palm wine or coconut vinegar. The hard shells, fibrous husks and long pinnate leaves are used to make products for furnishing and decoration.

The coconut has cultural and religious significance for many Austronesian peoples, appearing in their mythologies, songs, and oral traditions. It also has religious significance in South Asian cultures, where it is used in Hindu rituals, including weddings and worship.

Cocos-like fossils have been recovered from New Zealand and India. Genetic studies identify the coconut's center of origin as the Central Indo-Pacific, where it has its greatest genetic diversity. It was domesticated by Austronesian peoples in Island Southeast Asia and spread during the Neolithic via their seaborne migrations as far east as the Pacific Islands, and as far west as Madagascar. The species played a critical role in their long sea voyages by providing a portable source of food and water, as well as building materials for outrigger boats. Coconuts were spread much later along the coasts of the Indian and Atlantic Oceans by South Asian, Arab, and, from the 16th century, European sailors. Based on these introductions, the species can be divided into Pacific and Indo-Atlantic types. The Indo-Atlantic type was introduced to the Americas during the colonial era in the Columbian exchange.

Trees can grow up to 30 meters (100 feet) tall and can yield up to 75 fruits per year, though fewer than 30 is more typical. They are intolerant to cold and prefer copious precipitation and full sunlight. Many insect pests and diseases affect commercial production. In 2024, world production of coconuts was 65.5 million tonnes, with 73% of the total produced by Indonesia, India, and the Philippines.

== Description ==
Cocos nucifera is a large palm, growing up to 30 meters (100 feet) tall, with pinnate leaves 4–6 m (13–20 ft) long, and pinnae 60–90 centimeters (2–3 ft) long; old leaves break away cleanly, leaving the trunk smooth. On fertile soil, a tall coconut palm tree produces around 80 fruits per year; new varieties may be able to yield as many as 150 per year. In India, average production is over 8,000 nuts per hectare per year. Tall varieties produce their first fruit in 6 to 10 years, and live for 60 to 100 years; dwarf varieties become productive more quickly, but have a shorter lifespan.

=== Inflorescence ===
The coconut is monoecious, meaning that both male and female flowers grow on the same tree, in its case in the same inflorescence. It is possible that the species in addition occasionally has bisexual flowers. The female flower is much larger than the male flower. Mature trees grow continuously, producing leaves, flowers, and fruit all year round. It takes some 14 months for each flower primordium to develop into an inflorescence, botanically a spadix inside a sheathing spathe. A healthy tree can produce up to 15 inflorescences per year, staggered so that there is always a mature one with others in different stages of development. It takes 11 months from the opening of the female flowers to the time of harvest. Coconut palms are largely cross-pollinated, although most dwarf varieties are self-pollinating.

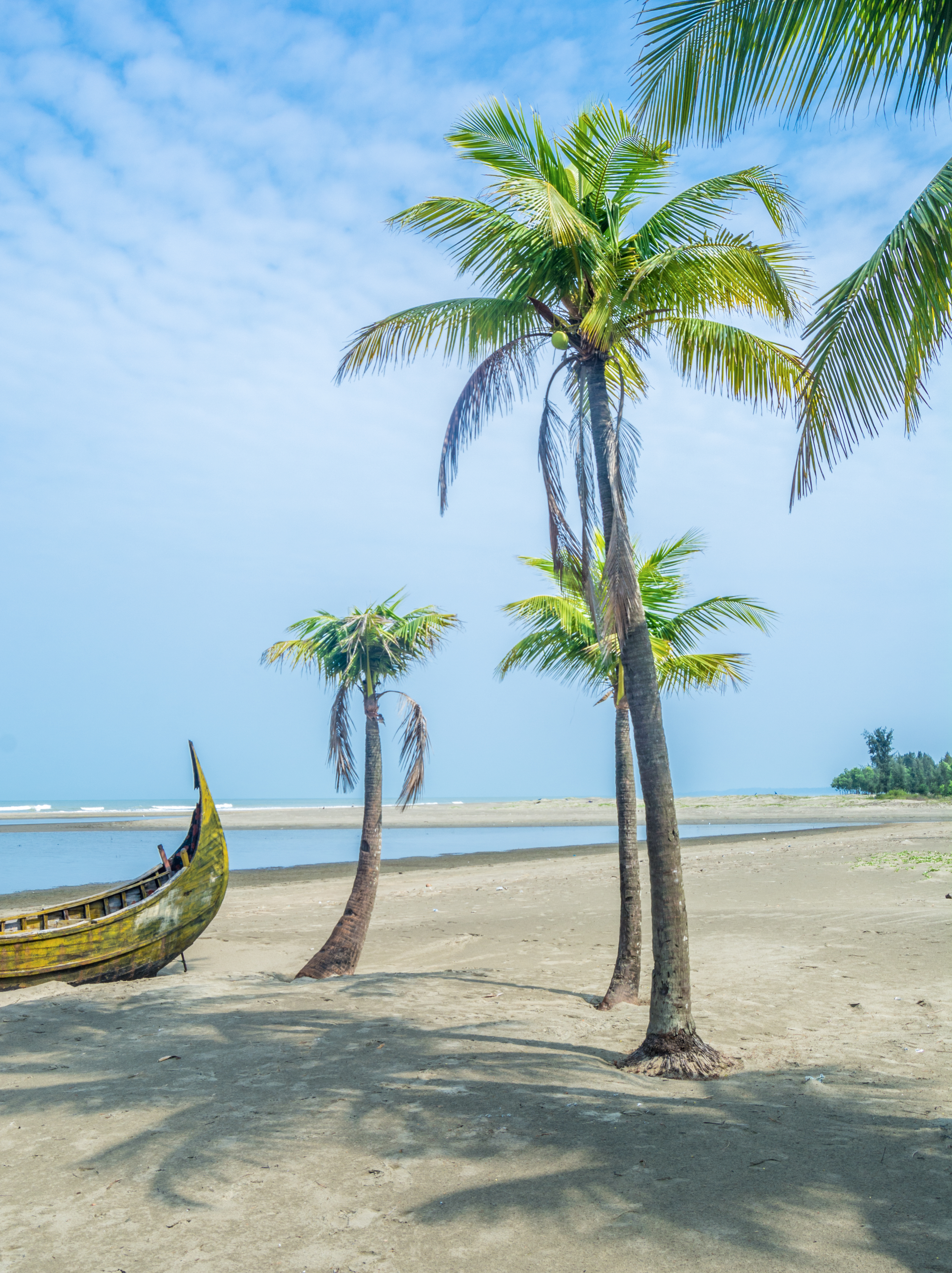
Habit

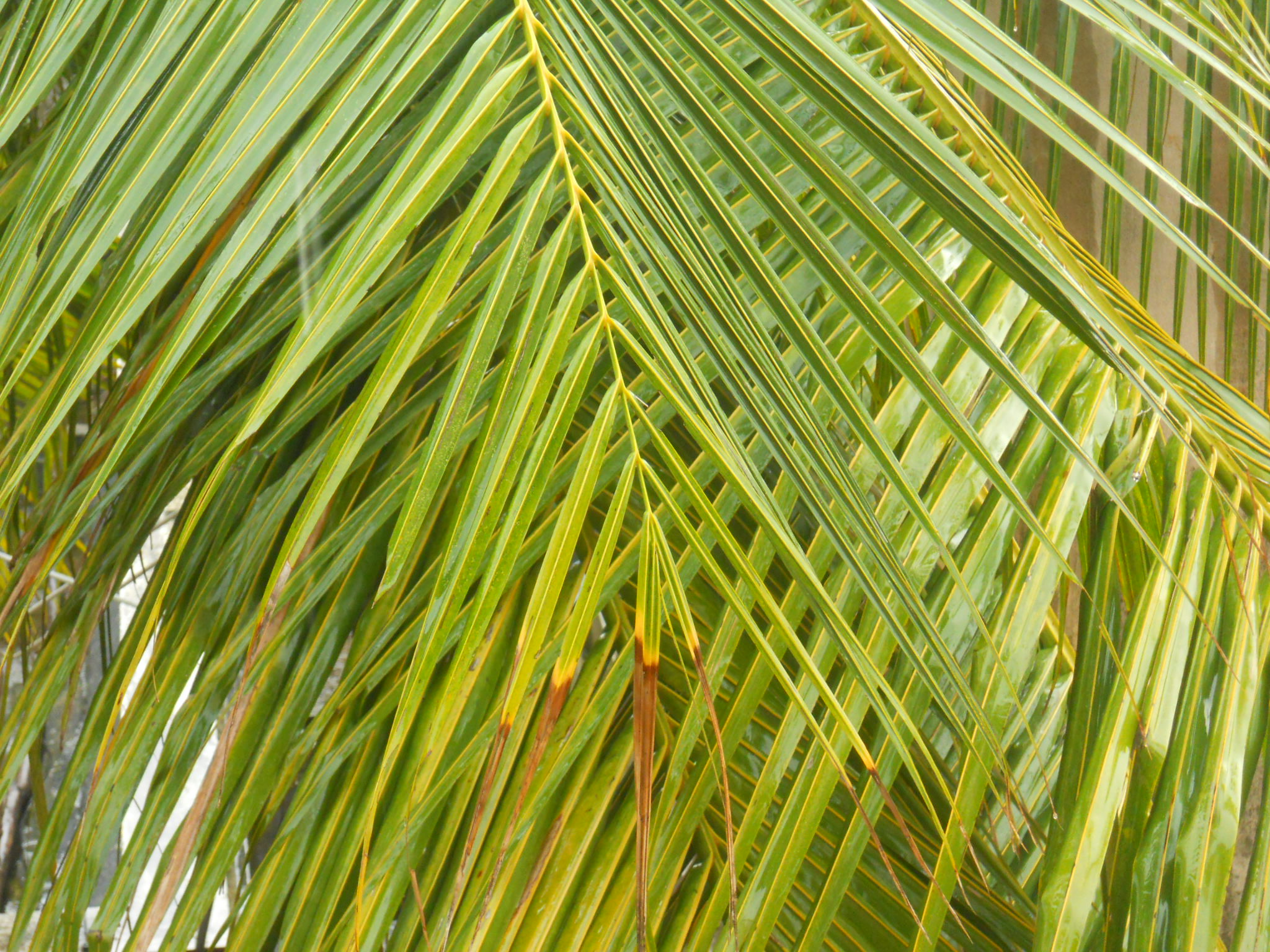
Leaves

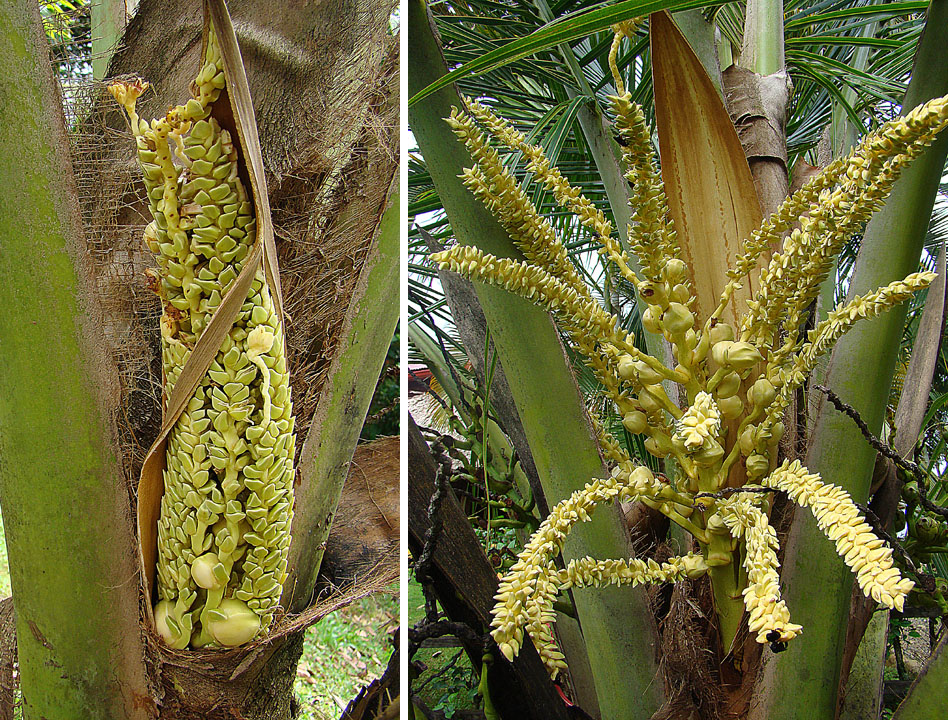
Inflorescence unfurling
with male and female flowers

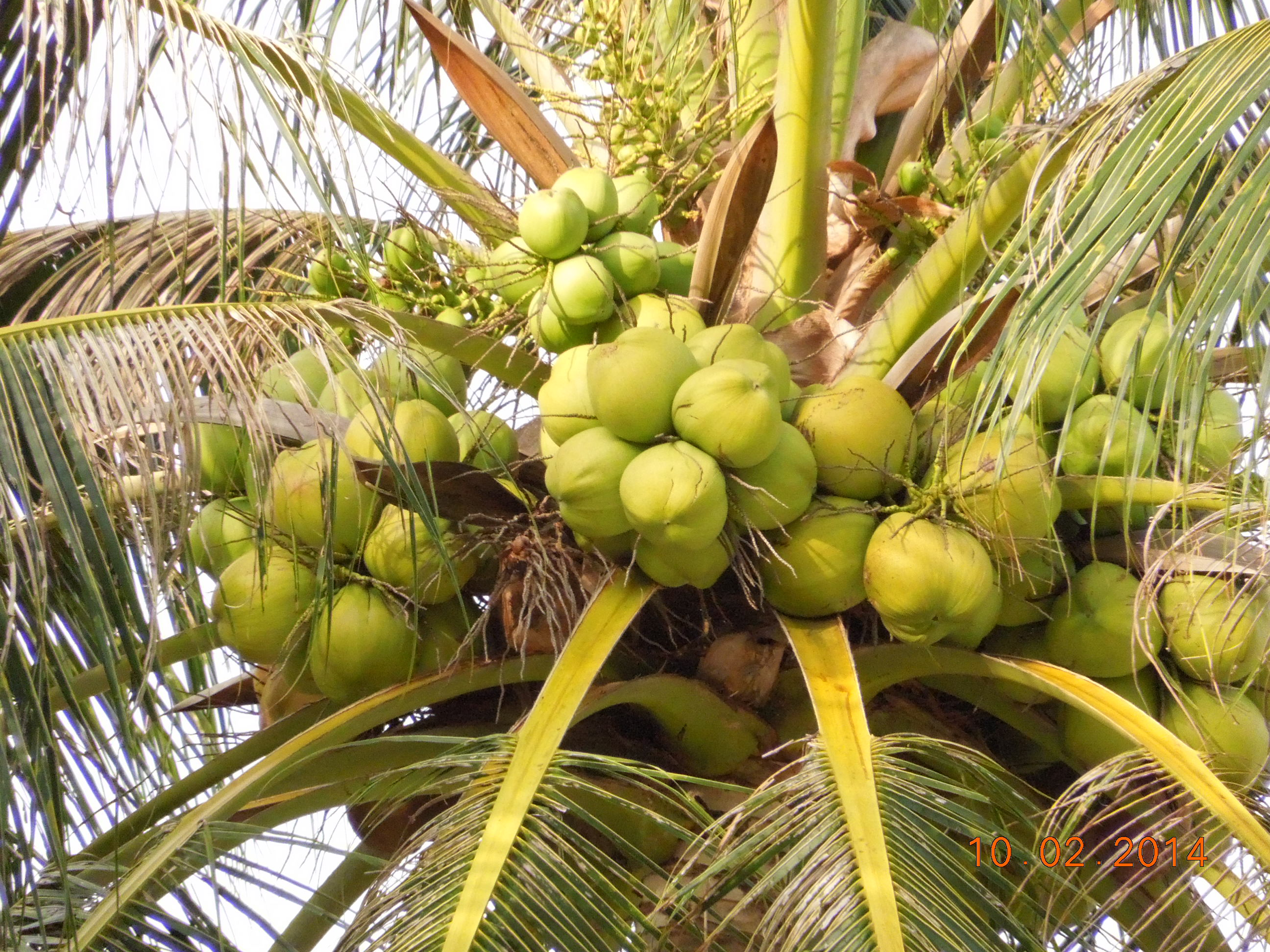
Tree with fruit

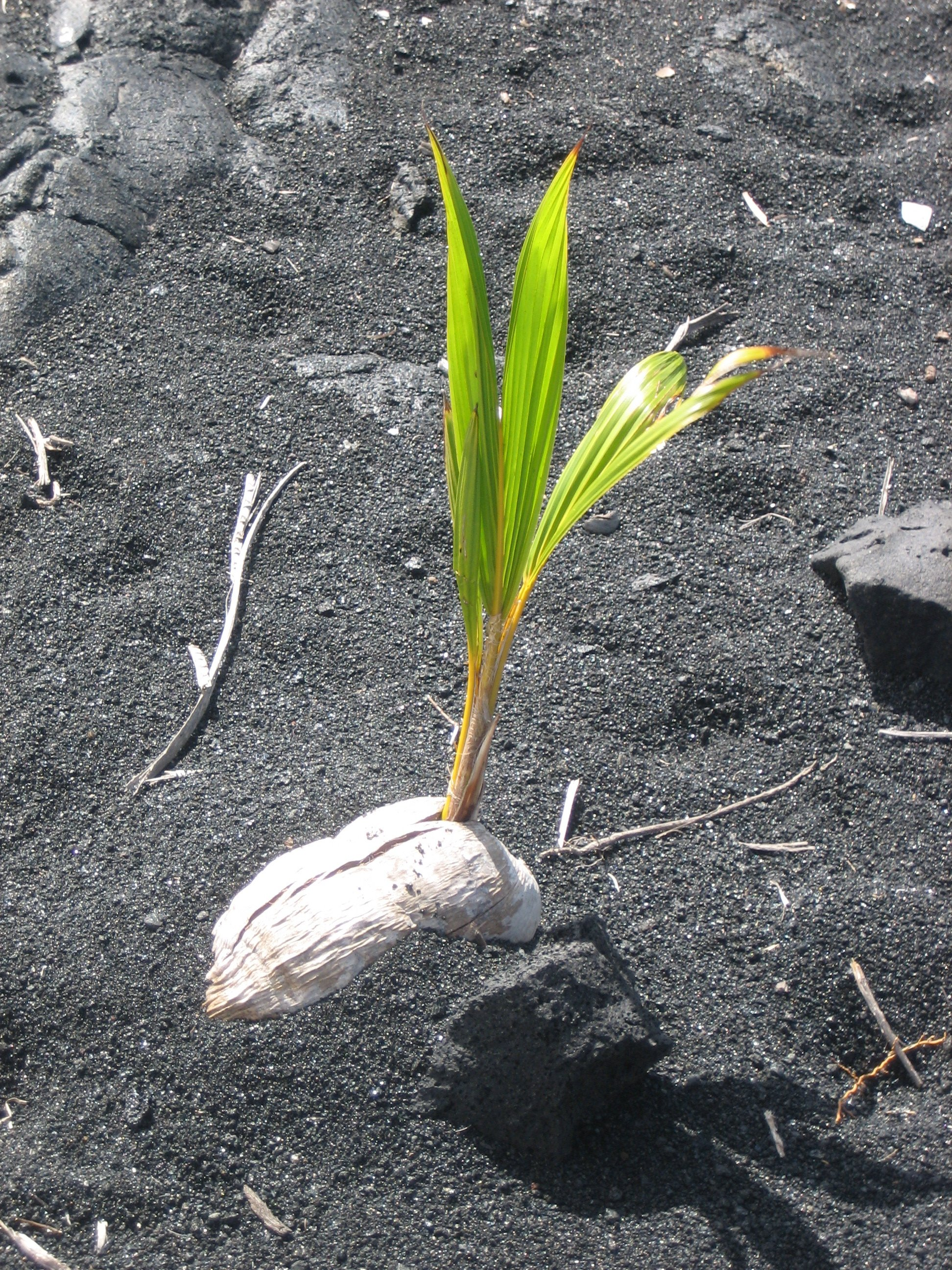
Seed germinating
in sand, Hawaii

=== Fruit ===
Composition of a Bido coconut
Component		Mass/kg	
Husk			2.033
Nut			1.125
of which	Shell	0.359	
of which	Juice	0.492	
of which	Meat	0.477	
Total			3.158

Botanically, the coconut fruit is a drupe, not a true nut. Like other fruits, it has three layers: the exocarp, mesocarp, and endocarp. The exocarp is the glossy outer skin, usually yellow-green to yellow-brown in color. The mesocarp is composed of a fiber, called coir, which has many traditional and commercial uses. The exocarp and the mesocarp make up the "husk" of the coconut, while the endocarp makes up the hard coconut "shell". The endocarp is around 4 millimeters (1/8 inch) thick and has three distinctive germination pores (micropyles) on the distal end. Two of the pores are plugged (the "eyes"), while one is functional.

The interior of the endocarp is hollow and is lined with a thin brown seed coat, some 0.2 mm (1/64 in) thick. The endocarp is initially filled with a liquid endosperm (the coconut water). The liquid contains many free cell nuclei (it is multinucleate) dividing by mitosis, without cell boundaries. As development continues, cellular layers of endosperm deposit along the walls of the endocarp up to 11 mm (3/8 in) thick, starting at the far end. They eventually form the edible solid endosperm ("coconut meat") which hardens over time. The small cylindrical embryo is embedded in the solid endosperm directly below the functional pore. During germination, the embryo pushes out of the functional pore and forms a haustorium inside the central cavity. This absorbs the solid endosperm to nourish the seedling.

The fruits have two distinctive forms. Wild niu kafa coconuts feature an elongated triangular fruit with a thicker husk and a smaller amount of endosperm. These make the fruits more buoyant, ideal for ocean dispersal. Domesticated niu vai Pacific coconuts are rounded in shape with a thinner husk, more endosperm, and more coconut water.

A full-sized fruit weighs about 1.4 kilograms (3 pounds 1 ounce) depending on variety. The 21st century Bido variety from Indonesia averages 3.158 kilograms (6 pounds 15.4 ounces) per fruit.

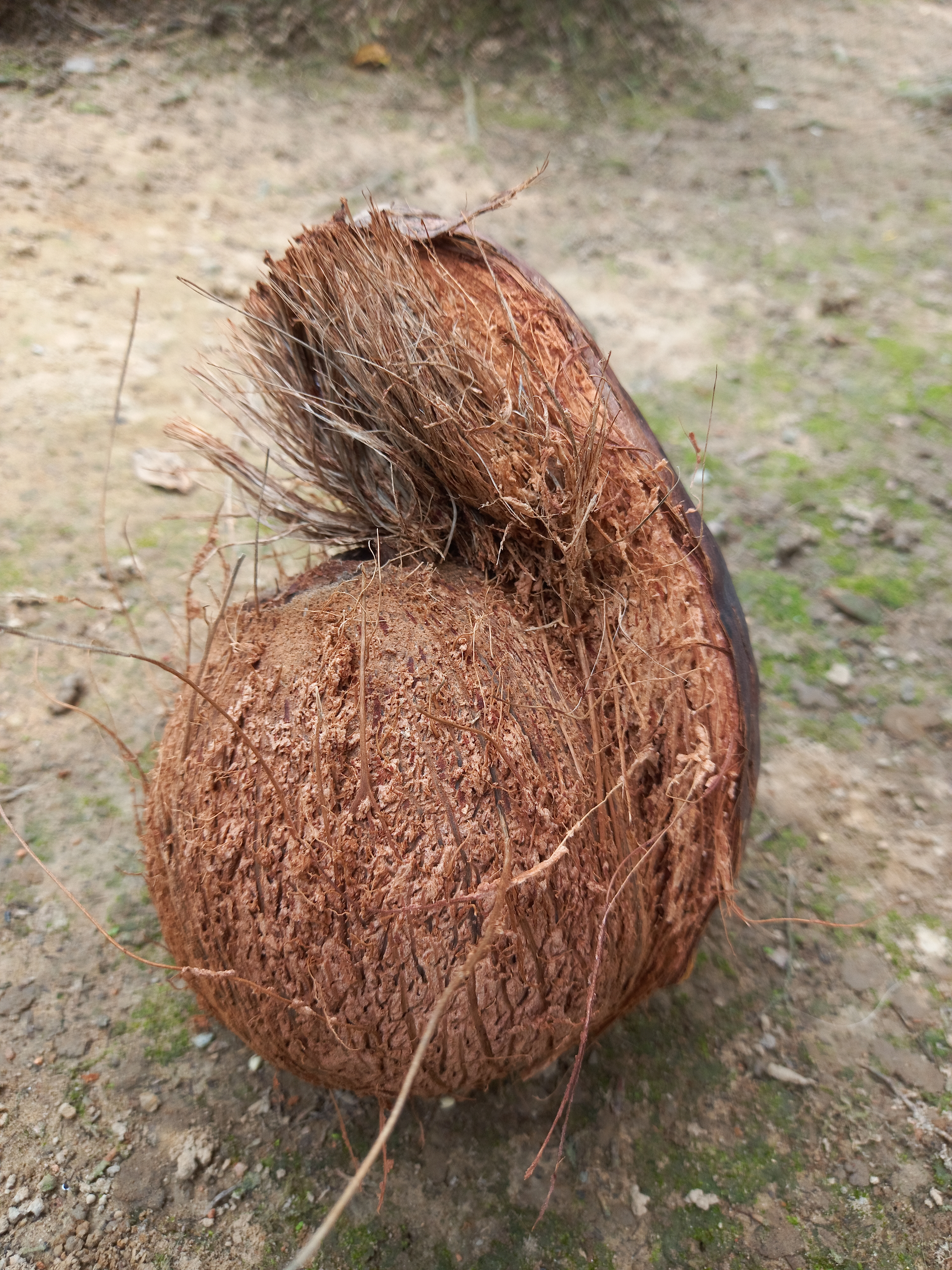
Fruit with husk partly removed, showing hard thin shell of endocarp (left), coir fiber of exocarp (right)

Coconuts are exported without husks; de-husked nuts from Côte d'Ivoire average around 575 grams, while de-husked nuts from the Dominican Republic average nearly 700 grams. Coconuts sold domestically in coconut-producing countries are typically not de-husked. Immature coconuts (6 to 8 months from flowering) are sold for coconut water and softer jelly-like coconut meat (known as "green coconuts", "young coconuts", or "water coconuts"), where the original coloration of the fruit is more pleasing.

Whole mature coconuts (11 to 13 months from flowering) sold for export, however, typically have the husk removed to reduce weight and volume for transport. This results in the naked coconut "shell" with three pores, remnants of the three carpels of the flower, more familiar in countries where coconuts are not grown locally. De-husked coconuts are easier for consumers to open, but have a shorter postharvest storage life of around two to three weeks at temperatures of 12 to 15 °C (54 to 59 °F) or up to 2 months at 0 to 1.5 °C (32.0 to 34.7 °F). In comparison, mature coconuts with a husk can be stored for three to five months at room temperature.

=== Roots ===
The palm tree has neither a taproot nor root hairs, but a fibrous root system. This consists of many thin roots that grow outward from the plant near the surface. Only a few penetrate deep into the soil for stability. This is known as a fibrous or adventitious root system, and is a characteristic of grass species. 2,000–4,000 adventitious roots may grow, each about 1 cm (1/2 in) in diameter. Decayed roots are replaced regularly as the tree grows new ones.

== Taxonomy ==
=== Taxonomic history ===
The Swedish botanist and taxonomist Carl Linnaeus formally described the species Cocos nucifera in his book Species Plantarum in 1753. The name is accepted by botanists. In 1768, in his book The Gardeners Dictionary, the English botanist Philip Miller redescribed the plant as Palma cocos, a name treated as a synonym. In 1891, the German botanist Otto Kuntze gave it the name Calappa nucifera in his Revisio Generum Plantarum, also treated as a synonym.

=== Etymology ===
The generic name Cocos, and the common name, is derived from the 16th-century Portuguese word coco, meaning 'head' or 'skull' after the three indentations on the coconut shell that give an impression of a face. This apparently came from encounters in 1521 by Portuguese and Spanish explorers with Pacific Islanders, when the coconut shell reminded them of ghosts in Portuguese folklore called coco or côca. In the West, the fruit was originally called nux indica, a name used by Marco Polo in 1280 while in Sumatra. His term is a translation from the Arabic of the time, where it was called جوز هندي jawz hindī, "Indian nut". Thenga, its Tamil/Malayalam name, was used in the detailed description of coconut found in Itinerario by Ludovico di Varthema published in 1510 and in the later Hortus Indicus Malabaricus.

The specific name nucifera means "nut-bearing", from the Latin words nux (nut) and fera (bearing).

== Origins ==
=== Fossil history ===
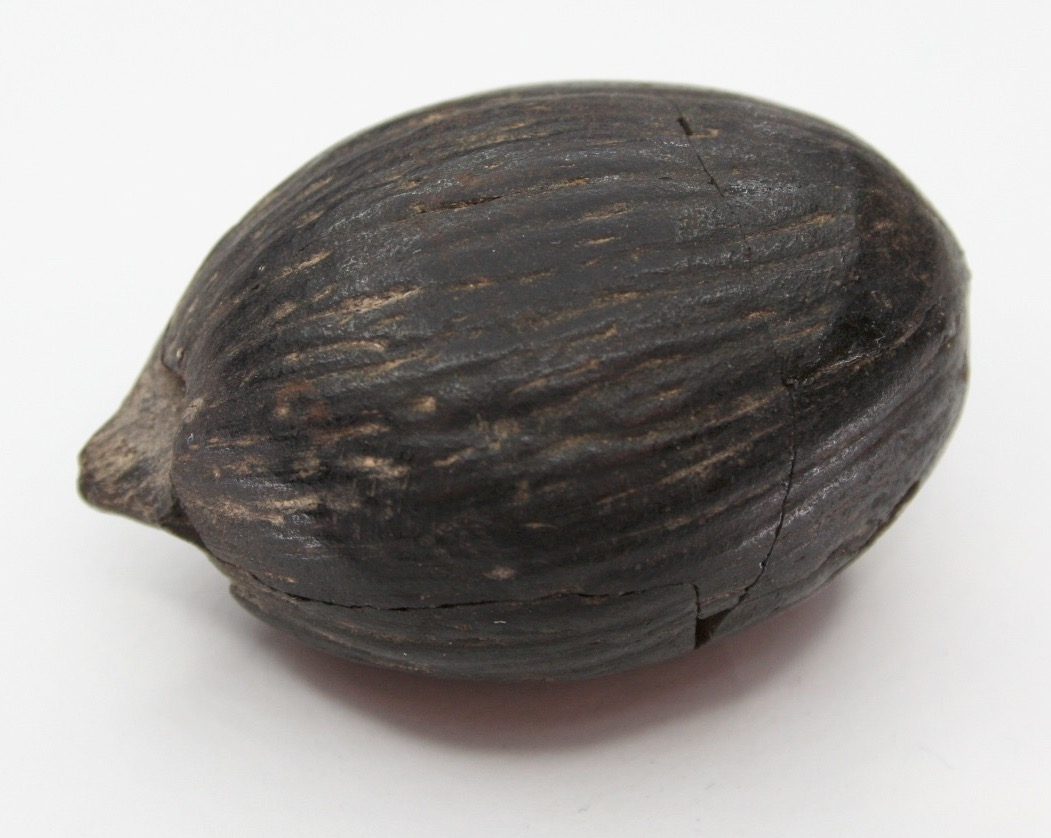
Fossil Cocos zeylandica from the Miocene of New Zealand, approximately the size of a strawberry at 3.5 cm (1 1/2 in) long

The vast majority of Cocos-like fossils have been recovered from only two regions in the world: New Zealand and west-central India. However, Cocos-like fossils are still putative, as they are difficult to identify. The earliest Cocos-like fossil to be found was C. zeylandica, a fossil species with small fruits, around 3.5 cm (1 1/2 in) × 1.3 to 2.5 cm (1/2 to 1 in) in size, from the Miocene (~23 to 5.3 million years ago) of New Zealand. Since then, numerous other fossils of similar fruits of uncertain affinity have been found in New Zealand from the Eocene, Oligocene, and possibly the Holocene. In the Deccan Traps of west-central India, numerous fossils of Cocos-like fruits, leaves, and stems have been found. They include morphotaxa like Palmoxylon sundaran, Palmoxylon insignae, and Palmocarpon cocoides. Cocos-like fossils of fruits include Cocos intertrappeansis, Cocos pantii, and Cocos sahnii. Some have been tentatively identified as modern C. nucifera. These include two specimens named C. palaeonucifera and C. binoriensis, both dated by their authors to the Maastrichtian–Danian of the early Tertiary (70 to 62 million years ago). C. binoriensis has been claimed to be the earliest known fossil of C. nucifera.

Only two other regions have reported Cocos-like fossils, namely Australia and Colombia. In Australia, a Cocos-like fossil fruit, measuring 10 cm × 9.5 cm (3 7/8 in × 3 3/4 in), was recovered from the Chinchilla Sand Formation dated to the latest Pliocene or basal Pleistocene. Rigby (1995) assigned them to modern Cocos nucifera based on its size. In Colombia, a single Cocos-like fruit was recovered from the middle to late Paleocene Cerrejón Formation. The fruit, however, was compacted in the fossilization process and it was not possible to determine if it had the diagnostic three pores that characterize members of the tribe Cocoseae. Nevertheless, one study assigned it to Cocos based on the size and the ridged shape of the fruit.

=== Phylogeny ===
A 2016 molecular phylogenomic analysis of the palms places the genus Cocos among the tribe Cocoseae:

- Cocoseae
  - Bactris spiny palms of C. and S. America
  - - Elaeis oleifera (American oil palm) of C. and S. America
    - - - Beccariophoenix madagascariensis (coastal beccariophoenix) of Madagascar
        - - Voanioala gerardii (forest coconut) of Madagascar
          - Jubaeopsis (Pondoland palm) of S. Africa
      - - - Jubaea chilensis (Chilean wine palm) of central Chile
          - Butia (feather palms) of S. America
        - - - Attalea non-spiny palms of C. and S. America
            - - Parajubaea palms of the Northern Andes
              - Allagoptera monoecious palms of S. America
          - - Cocos nucifera (coconut palm)
            - Syagrus palms of S. America

=== Human dispersal ===
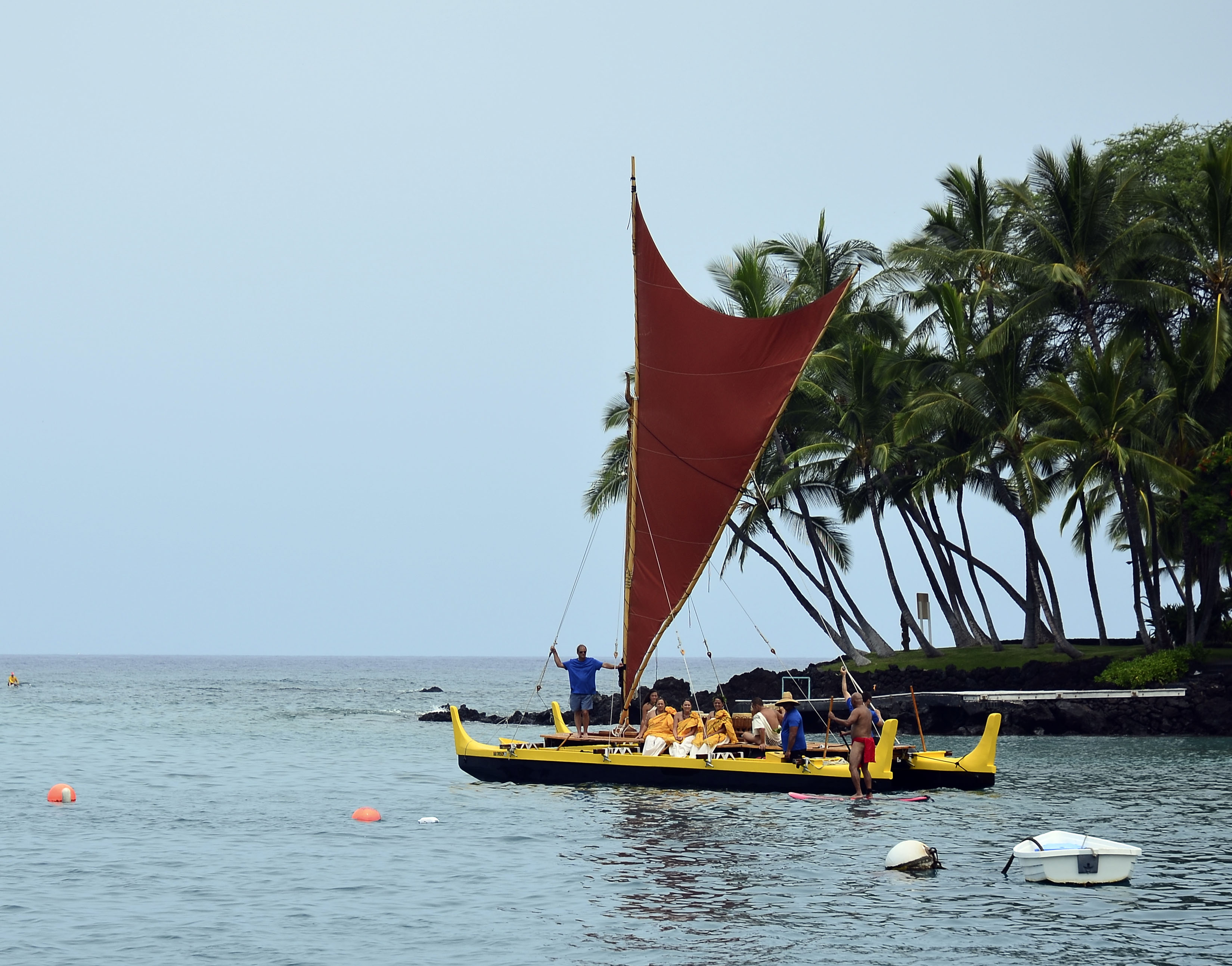
Catamarans allowed Austronesians to colonize the islands of the Indo-Pacific and introduce coconuts as they migrated.

Genetic studies identify the coconut's center of origin as the Central Indo-Pacific, where it has its greatest genetic diversity. Its cultivation and spread was closely tied to migrations of the Austronesian peoples who carried coconuts to the islands they settled. Linguistic, archaeological, and genetic evidence all points to domestication of Pacific coconuts by Austronesians in Southeast Asia during the Austronesian expansion (c. 3000 to 1500 BCE). Drift models based on wind and ocean currents show that coconuts could not have drifted across the Pacific unaided, implying that dispersal was human-assisted.

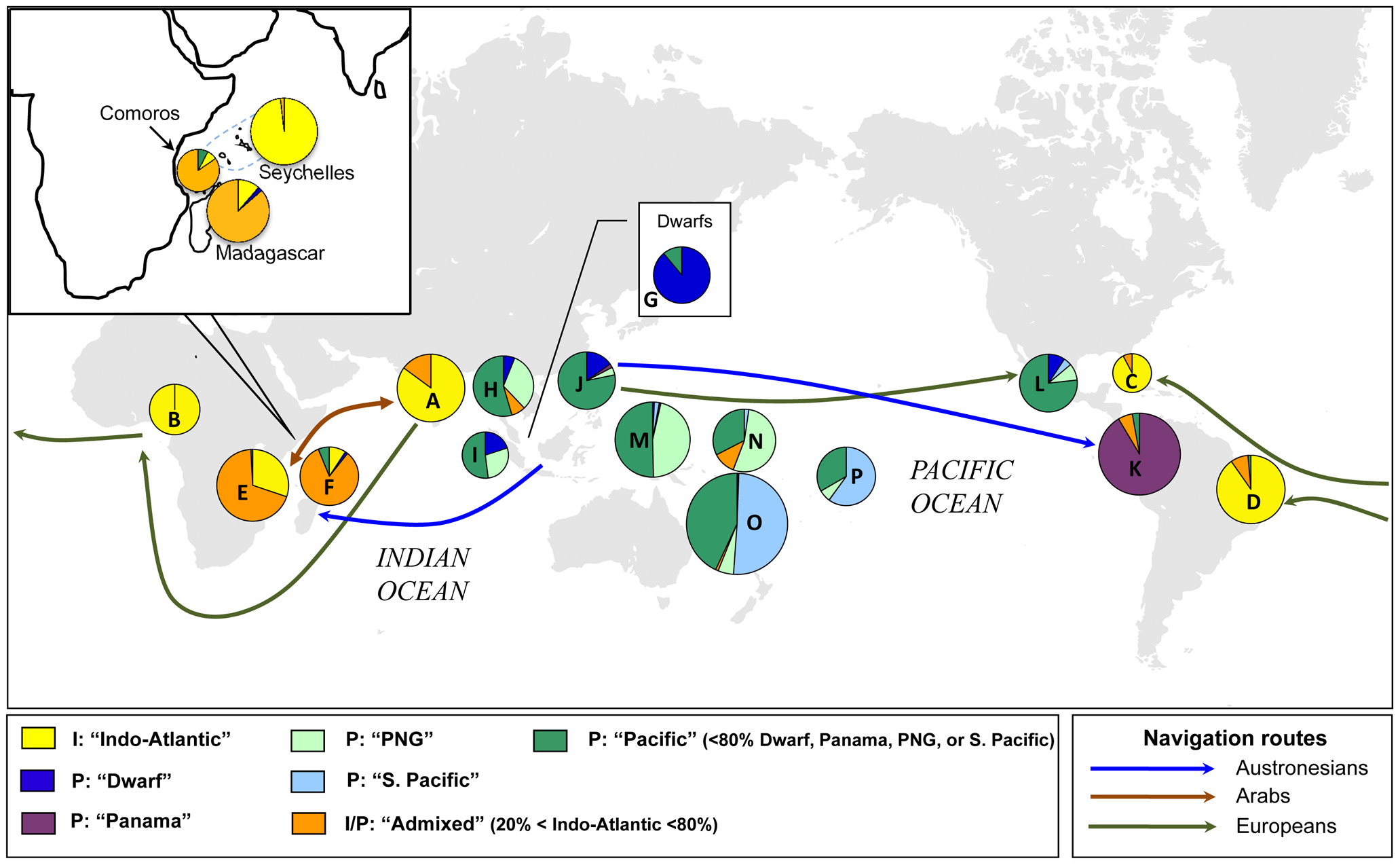
Geographical distributions of Indo-Atlantic and Pacific coconut subpopulations and their genetic composition

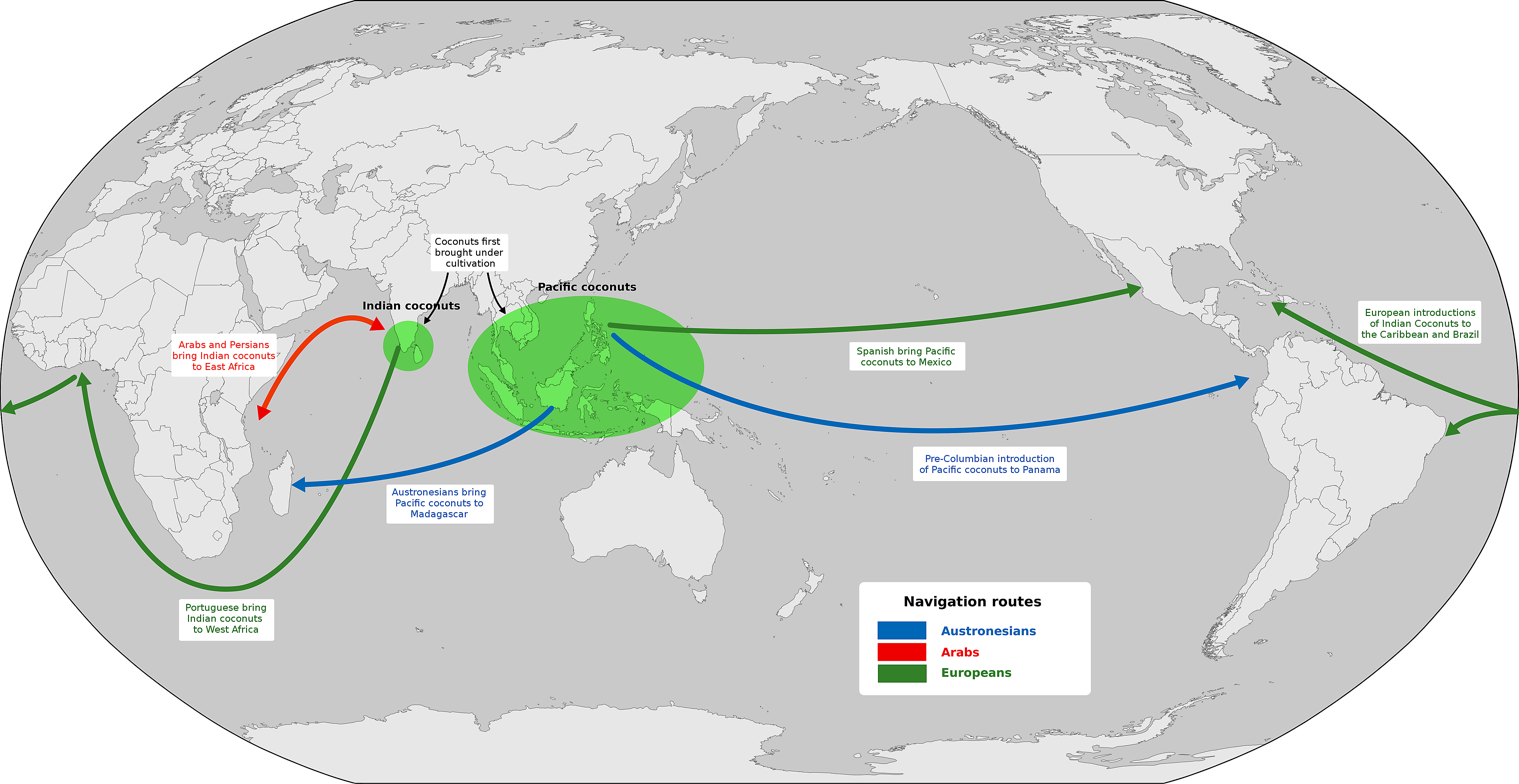
Inferred historical introduction of coconuts from the original centers of diversity in the Indian subcontinent and Island Southeast Asia

Coconuts are divided into two subpopulations, a Pacific group from Island Southeast Asia and an Indo-Atlantic group from the south of the Indian subcontinent. The Pacific group is clearly domesticated, with dwarf habit, self-pollination, and niu vai fruits with large endosperm-to-husk ratios. The distribution of Pacific coconuts corresponds to regions settled by Austronesian voyagers, especially Madagascar. The island's coconuts show genetic admixture between the two subpopulations, indicating that Pacific coconuts interbred with Indo-Atlantic coconuts there. Although archaeological remains from 1000 to 500 BCE suggest that Indo-Atlantic coconuts were later independently cultivated by Dravidian peoples, only Pacific coconuts show clear domestication traits like dwarf habits, self-pollination, and rounded fruits. Indo-Atlantic coconuts, in contrast, have the ancestral traits of tall habits and elongated triangular fruits.

Genetic studies have confirmed pre-Columbian populations of coconuts in Panama. However, it is not native and displays a genetic bottleneck resulting from a founder effect. Coconuts in the Americas are most closely related to those in the Philippines, indicating that the coconuts were not introduced naturally, such as by sea currents, but by early Austronesian sailors to the Americas from at least 300 BCE. During the colonial era, Pacific coconuts were introduced to Mexico from the Spanish East Indies via the Manila galleons, starting in the 16th century. In contrast, Indo-Atlantic coconuts were spread by Arab and Persian traders into the East African coast. Indo-Atlantic coconuts were introduced into the Atlantic Ocean by Portuguese ships from colonies in India and Sri Lanka, again starting in the 16th century: first to coastal West Africa, and then to the Caribbean and Brazil.

=== Domestication ===
Coconuts can be broadly divided into two fruit types – the ancestral niu kafa form with a thick-husked, angular fruit, and the niu vai form with a thin-husked, spherical fruit with a higher proportion of endosperm. The terms are Samoan.

The niu kafa form is the wild ancestral type, with thick husks to protect the seed, and an angular, highly ridged shape to promote buoyancy during ocean dispersal. It is the dominant form in the Indo-Atlantic coconuts. However, they may have been selected to some extent for thicker husks for coir production, which was important in Austronesian material culture as a source for cordage in building houses and boats.

Two major fruit types

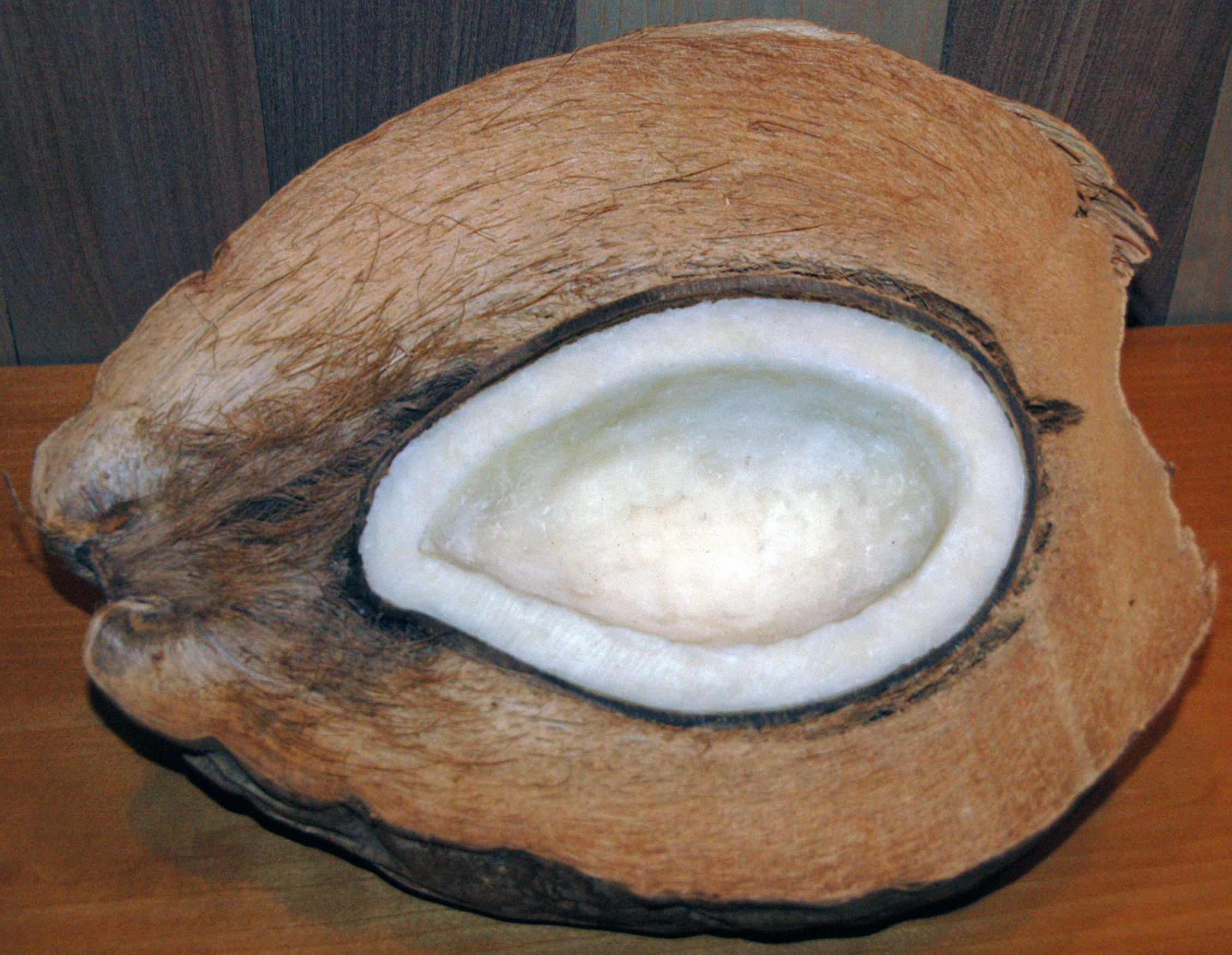
The niu kafa form of wild and Indo-Atlantic coconuts, possibly selected for more coir for houses and boats

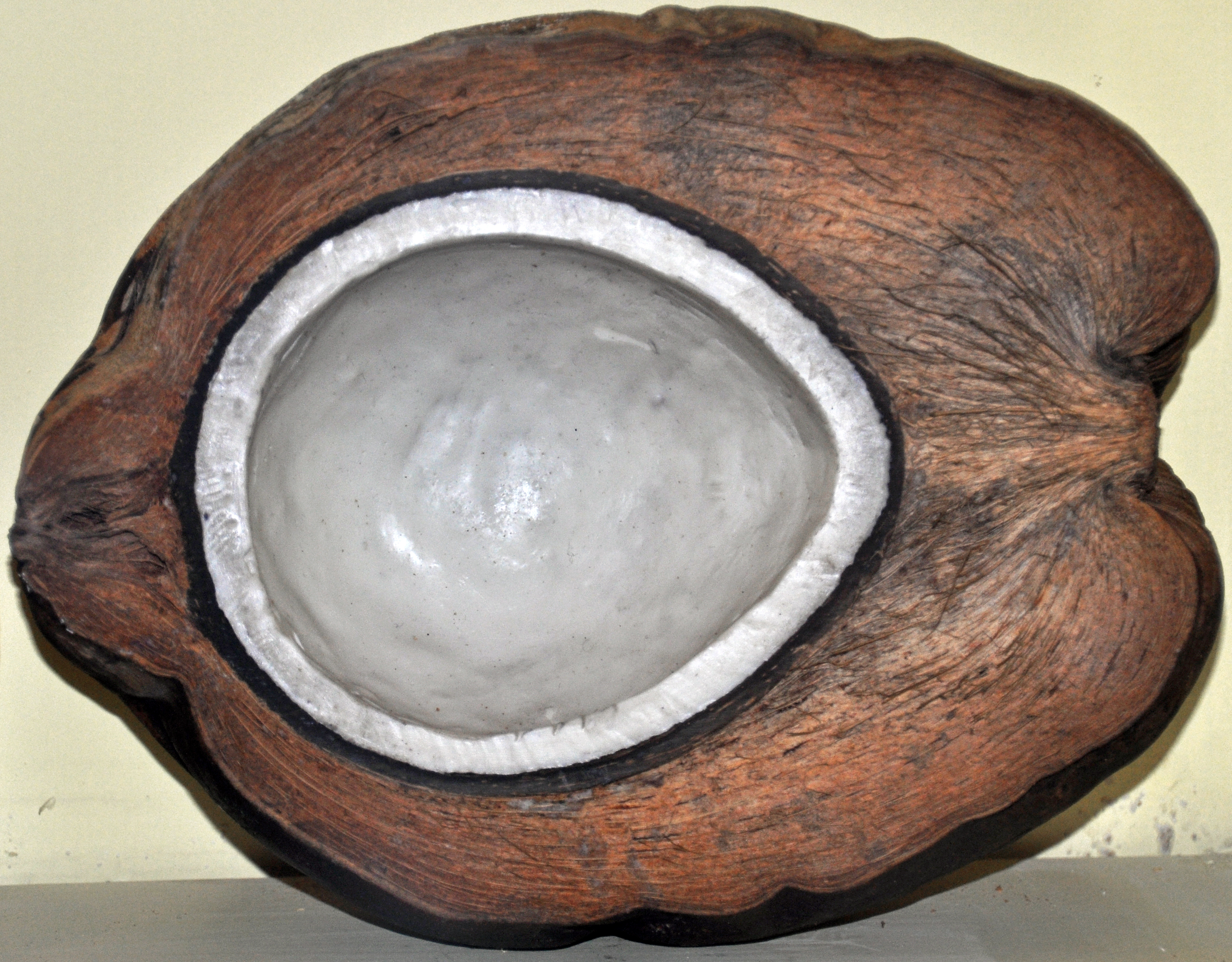
The niu vai form of domesticated Pacific coconuts, selected for more meat and water, and less husk

The niu vai form is the domesticated form dominant in Pacific coconuts. They were artificially selected by Austronesians for their larger endosperm-to-husk ratio and higher coconut water content, making them more useful as food and water reserves for sea voyages. The decreased buoyancy and increased fragility of this spherical, thin-husked fruit did not matter for a species that had started to be dispersed by humans and grown in plantations. Niu vai endocarp fragments have been recovered in archaeological sites in the St. Matthias Islands of the Bismarck Archipelago. The fragments are dated to approximately 1000 BCE, suggesting that cultivation and artificial selection of coconuts were already practiced by the Austronesian Lapita people.

Coconuts can be broadly divided into two general types based on habit: the "Tall" (var. typica) and "Dwarf" (var. nana) varieties. The two groups are genetically distinct, with the dwarf variety showing a greater degree of artificial selection for ornamental traits and for early germination and fruiting. The tall variety is outcrossing while dwarf palms are self-pollinating, which has led to a much greater degree of genetic diversity within the tall group.

The dwarf coconut cultivars are fully domesticated, unlike the more diverse tall cultivars. Dwarf coconuts share three genetic markers out of thirteen (rare in tall cultivars), making it likely that they originate from a single domesticated population. Philippine and Malayan dwarf coconuts diverged early into two distinct types. They usually remain genetically isolated when introduced to new regions. Numerous other dwarf cultivars developed after such introductions, hybridizing with tall cultivars. The origin of dwarf varieties is Southeast Asia, which contain the tall cultivars genetically closest to dwarf coconuts.

Genome sequencing of tall and dwarf varieties reveals that they diverged 2 to 8 million years ago and that the dwarf variety arose through alterations in genes for the metabolism of the plant hormone gibberellin.

Another ancestral variety is the niu leka of Polynesia (the "Compact Dwarfs"). Although it resembles dwarf coconuts (including slow growth), it is genetically distinct and was independently domesticated, likely in Tonga. Other cultivars of niu leka may exist in other islands of the Pacific, and some are probably descendants of advanced crosses between Compact Dwarfs and Southeast Asian Dwarf types.

== Distribution and habitat ==
Coconuts have a nearly cosmopolitan distribution due to human cultivation and dispersal. However, their original distribution was in the Central Indo-Pacific, in the regions of Maritime Southeast Asia and Melanesia.

The coconut palm thrives on sandy soils and is highly tolerant of salinity. It prefers areas with abundant sunlight and regular rainfall of between 1500 mm and 2500 mm per year. It prefers humidity above 60%. If rainfall is less than this, it can survive if its roots can reach the soil water table, but it cannot tolerate waterlogging. It grows from sea level to an altitude of 600 meters (2,000 ft) in the tropics. It can tolerate a dry season of one month on sandy soils inland, and as much as three months on heavier soils, but the soil must be free-draining. It grows on soils with a pH of 4.5 to 8 (the latter on coral atolls), but prefers a range of 5.5 to 7. Growth is seriously limited by shade. It can resist hurricane-strength winds provided it has developed a good root system.

Wild coconuts are restricted to coastal areas in sandy, saline soils. The fruit is adapted for ocean dispersal. Coconuts could not reach inland locations without human intervention to carry seednuts and plant seedlings.

Wild coconuts are native to Bismarck Archipelago, Maluku, New Guinea, Philippines, Queensland, Samoa, Santa Cruz Islands, Solomon Islands, Tokelau, Tonga, and Vanuatu.

They are introduced to Andaman Islands, Angola, Ascension, Assam, Bahamas, Bangladesh, Belize, Benin, Bolivia, Borneo, Brazil Cambodia, Cameroon, Caroline Islands, Cayman Islands, Central African Republic, Central America, Chagos Archipelago, Chile, China Christmas Islands, Coco Islands, Colombia, Comoros, Cook Islands, Costa Rica, Cuba, Dominican Republic, DR Congo, Easter Island El Salvador, Fiji, Florida, French Guiana, Gabon, Gambia, Ghana, Gilbert Islands, Guinea, Guinea-Bissau, Hainan, Haiti, Hawai'i, Honduras, India, Ivory Coast, Jamaica, Java, Kenya, Laccadive Islands, Leeward Islands, Lesser Sunda Islands, Liberia, Line Islands, Madagascar, Peninsular Malaysia, Maldives, Marcus Island, Mariana Islands, Marquesas Islands, Marshall Islands, Mauritius, Mexico Mozambique, Myanmar, Nauru, New Caledonia, Nicaragua, Nicobar Islands, Nigeria, Niue, Phoenix Islands, Puerto Rico, Réunion, Senegal, Seychelles, Society Islands, South China Sea, Caribbean, Sri Lanka, Sulawesi, Sumatra, Taiwan, Tanzania, Thailand, Togo, Trinidad and Tobago, Tuamotu, Tubuai Islands, Tuvalu,Venezuela, Vietnam, Wallis and Futuna, and Windward Islands.

== Cultivation ==
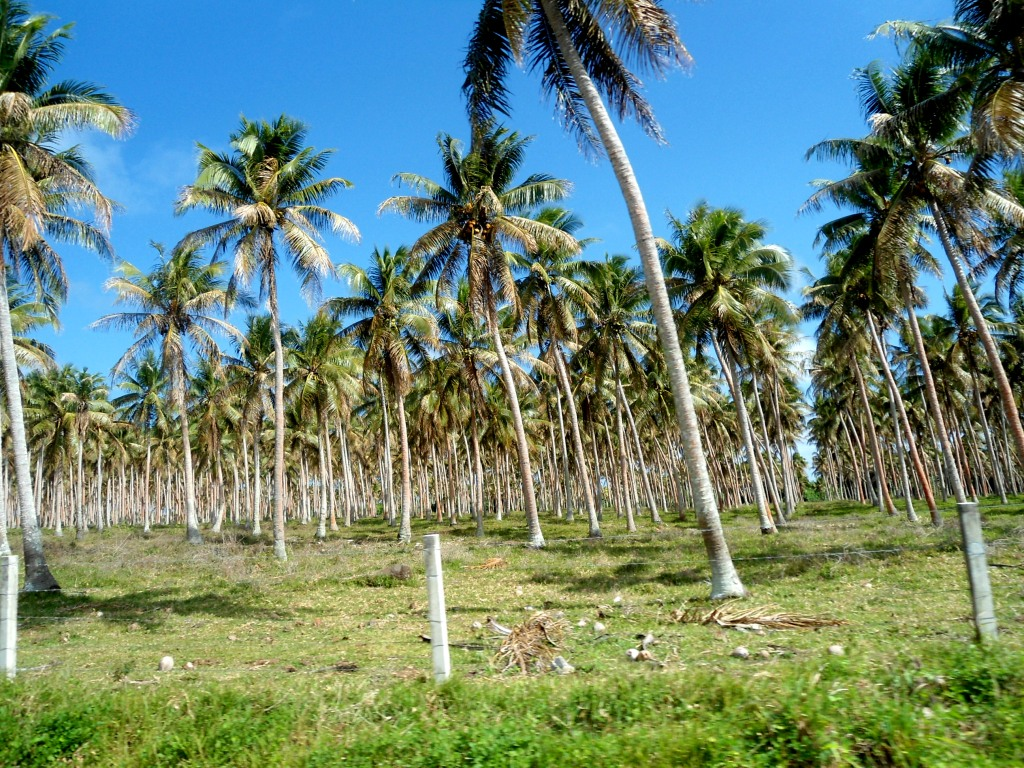
A coconut plantation in Efate, Vanuatu

Coconut palms are normally cultivated in hot and wet tropical climates. They need year-round warmth and moisture to grow well and fruit. Coconut palms are hard to establish in dry climates, and cannot grow there without frequent irrigation. In drought conditions, the new leaves do not open well, older leaves may become desiccated, and fruit may be shed.

The extent of cultivation in the tropics is threatening a number of habitats, such as mangroves; an example of such damage to an ecoregion is in the Petenes mangroves of the Yucatán. Uniquely among trees, coconut trees can be irrigated with sea water.

=== Pests and diseases ===
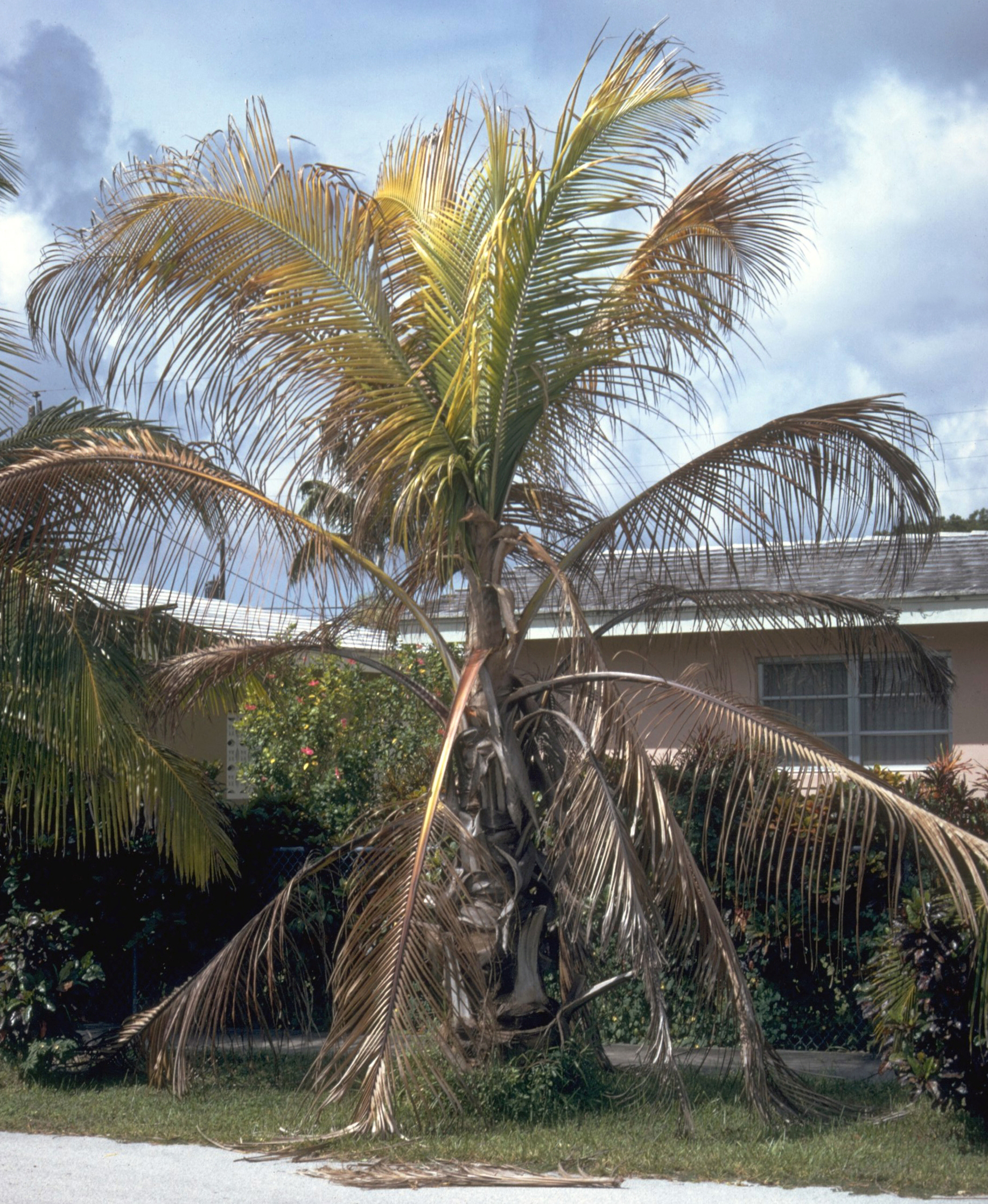
A coconut palm dying of lethal yellowing, a phytoplasma disease

Coconuts are susceptible to the phytoplasma disease, lethal yellowing. Yellowing diseases affect plantations in Africa, India, Mexico, the Caribbean and the Pacific Region.

The coconut palm is damaged by the larvae of many Lepidoptera (butterfly and moth) species which feed on it, including the African armyworm (Spodoptera exempta) and Batrachedra spp.: B. arenosella, B. atriloqua (feeds exclusively on C. nucifera), B. mathesoni (feeds exclusively on C. nucifera), and B. nuciferae.

The coconut leaf beetle Brontispa longissima feeds on young leaves, and damages both seedlings and mature coconut palms. In 2007, the Philippines imposed a quarantine in Metro Manila and 26 provinces to stop the spread of the pest and protect the Philippine coconut industry managed by some 3.5 million farmers.

The fruit may be damaged by eriophyid coconut mites (Aceria guerreronis). This mite infests coconut plantations, and can cause economic damage up to 60% of coconut production. The immature seeds are infested and damaged by larvae. Chemical control is possible, but since it needs to be repeated frequently it is impracticable on grounds of cost, environmental harm, and pesticide residues in coconut meat and coconut water.

=== Cultivars ===
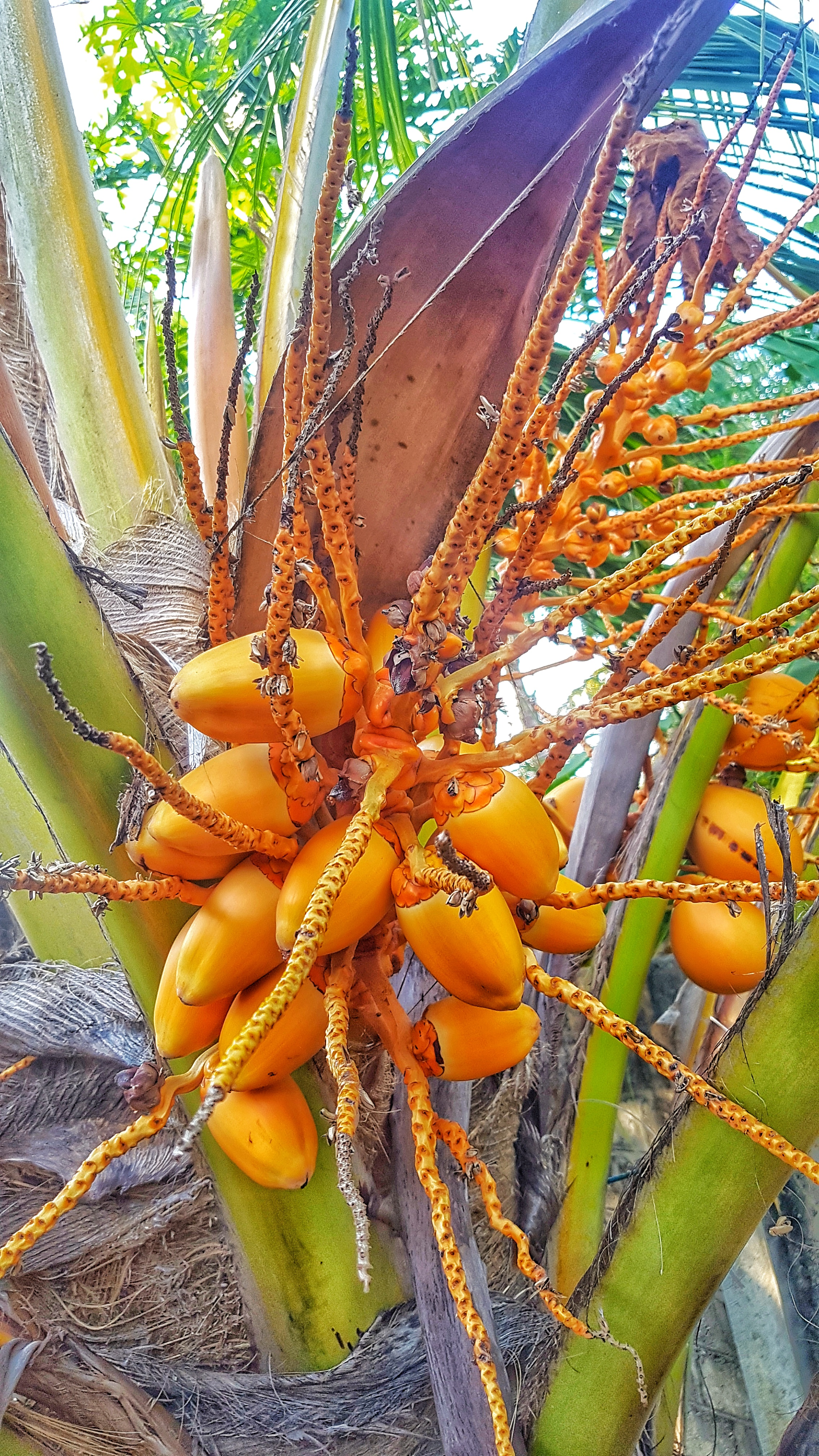
King coconut, a shorter cultivar of Sri Lanka

Coconut has many commercial and traditional cultivars. They can be sorted mainly into tall, dwarf, and hybrid cultivars (hybrids between talls and dwarfs). Varieties are often regional, such as Ceylon Tall, Jamaica Tall, Java Tall, and Malayan Tall.

Dwarf varieties of Pacific coconuts have been cultivated by Austronesian peoples since ancient times. These varieties were selected for slower growth, sweeter coconut water, and often brightly colored fruits. Dwarf varieties include Dwarf Green and Dwarf Orange.

Varieties have been selected for diverse traits: for example, King coconut is a Sri Lankan variety with a relatively low sugar content, while Macapuno has soft jelly-like flesh that fills the whole central cavity; it is used to make sweet desserts.

Maypan is an F1 hybrid bred in Jamaica in the 1970s to resist lethal yellowing. However, Maypan resistance soon began to fail, possibly as early as the 1980s, and certainly by the 2000s. Some other coconut varieties have natural resistance to lethal yellowing with alleles at microsatellites, with Vanuatu tall and Sri-Lanka green dwarf as the most resistant cultivars, while West African tall is especially susceptible.

=== Breeding ===
Conventional plant breeding is of limited use with coconut because there is no wild coconut species to supply additional genetic diversity; the generation time is long; there is much heterozygosity; artificial pollination to conduct crosses produces only a few seeds; and vegetative reproduction (cloning) is unreliable. Coconut breeding objectives can include copra content, production of female flowers, oil content, aroma of coconut meat and water, softness and sweetness of endosperm, drought tolerance, resistance to root wilt, and resistance to eriophorid mites.

Hybrids provide higher precocity and productivity with the number of fruits than other breeds, but they produce fruits with low market acceptance for the water quality of the fruit. Intravarietal crosses in Dwarf coconut (dwarf coconuts bred together) have been tested to provide better water quality for the coconut water market than the hybrids.

=== Harvesting ===
Harvesting techniques
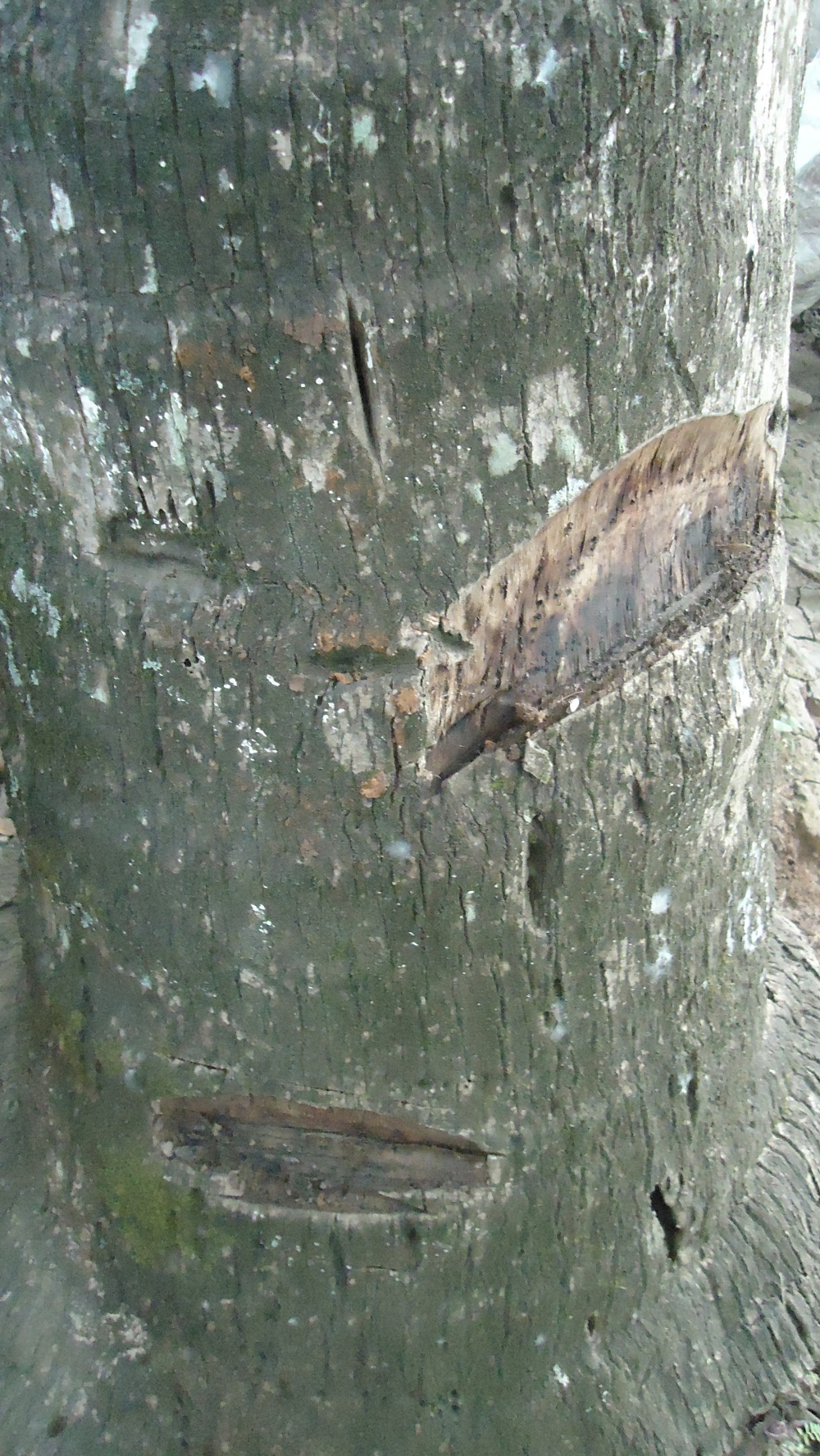
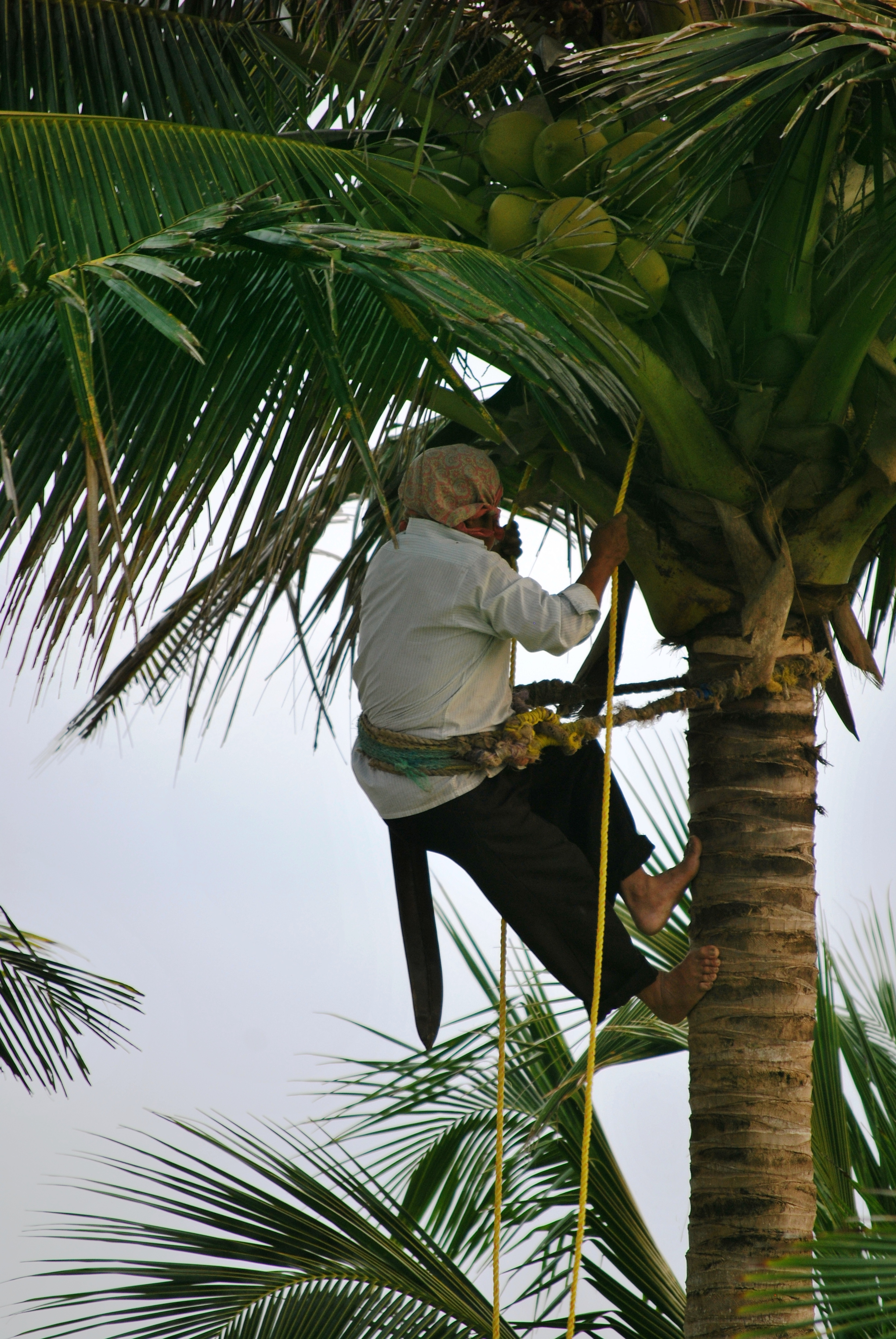
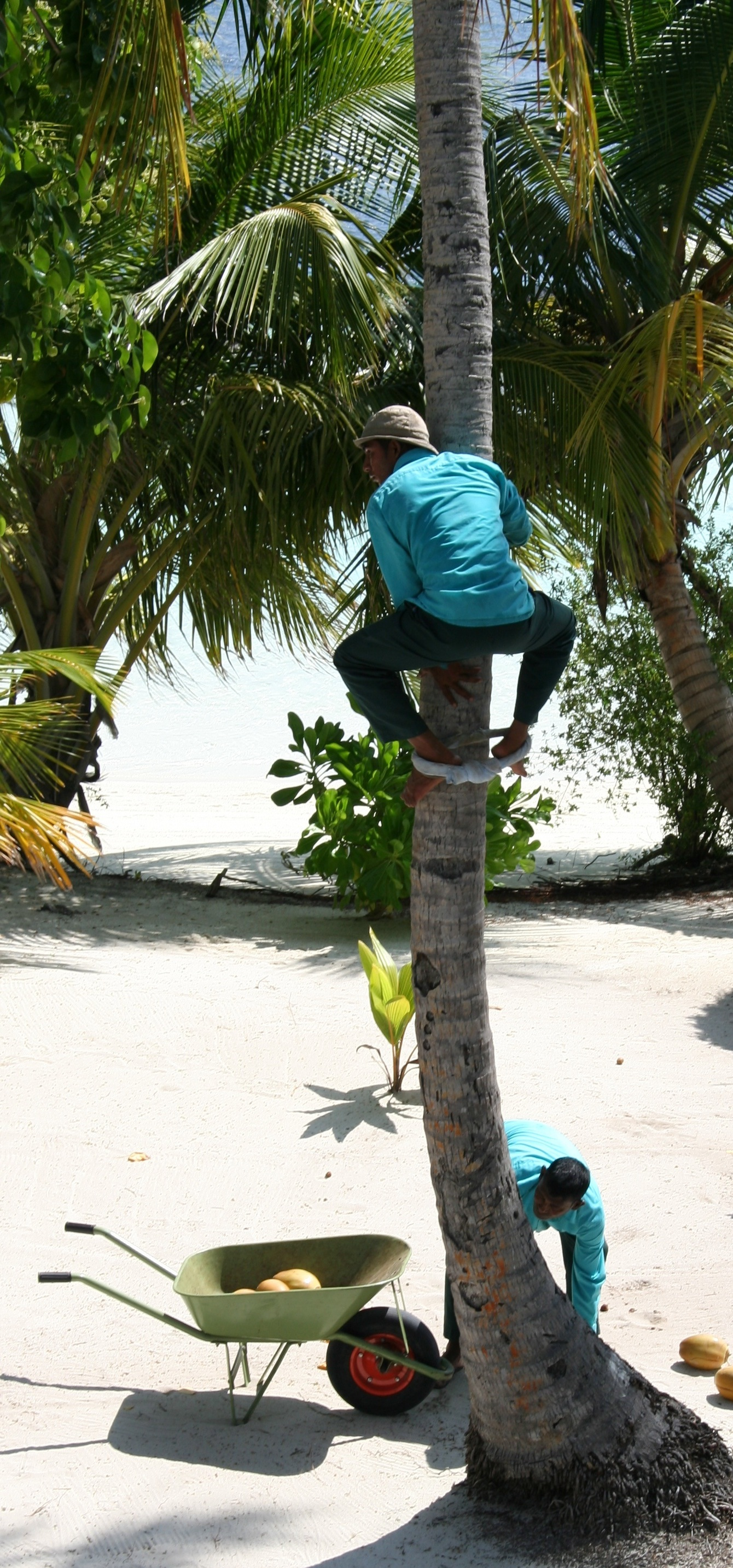
Left: climbing using notches cut into the trunk, Philippines
Center: using ropes and pulleys, Mexico
Right: using a loop of cloth around the ankles, Maldives

The two most common harvesting methods are by climbing and by using poles.

Climbing is the more widespread, but it is more dangerous and requires skilled workers. Manually climbing trees is traditional in most countries and requires a posture that exerts pressure on the trunk with the feet. Climbers employed on coconut plantations often develop musculoskeletal disorders and risk injury or death from falling. For safety, coconut climbers in the Philippines and Guam use a bolo knife tied with a rope to the waist to cut grooves at regular intervals on the coconut trunks. This makes the trunk of the tree more like a ladder, though it reduces the value of timber recovered from the trees and can admit infection. Other methods to make climbing easier include using a system of pulleys and ropes; using pieces of vine, rope, or cloth tied to both hands or feet; using spikes attached to the feet or legs; or attaching coconut husks to the trunk with ropes.

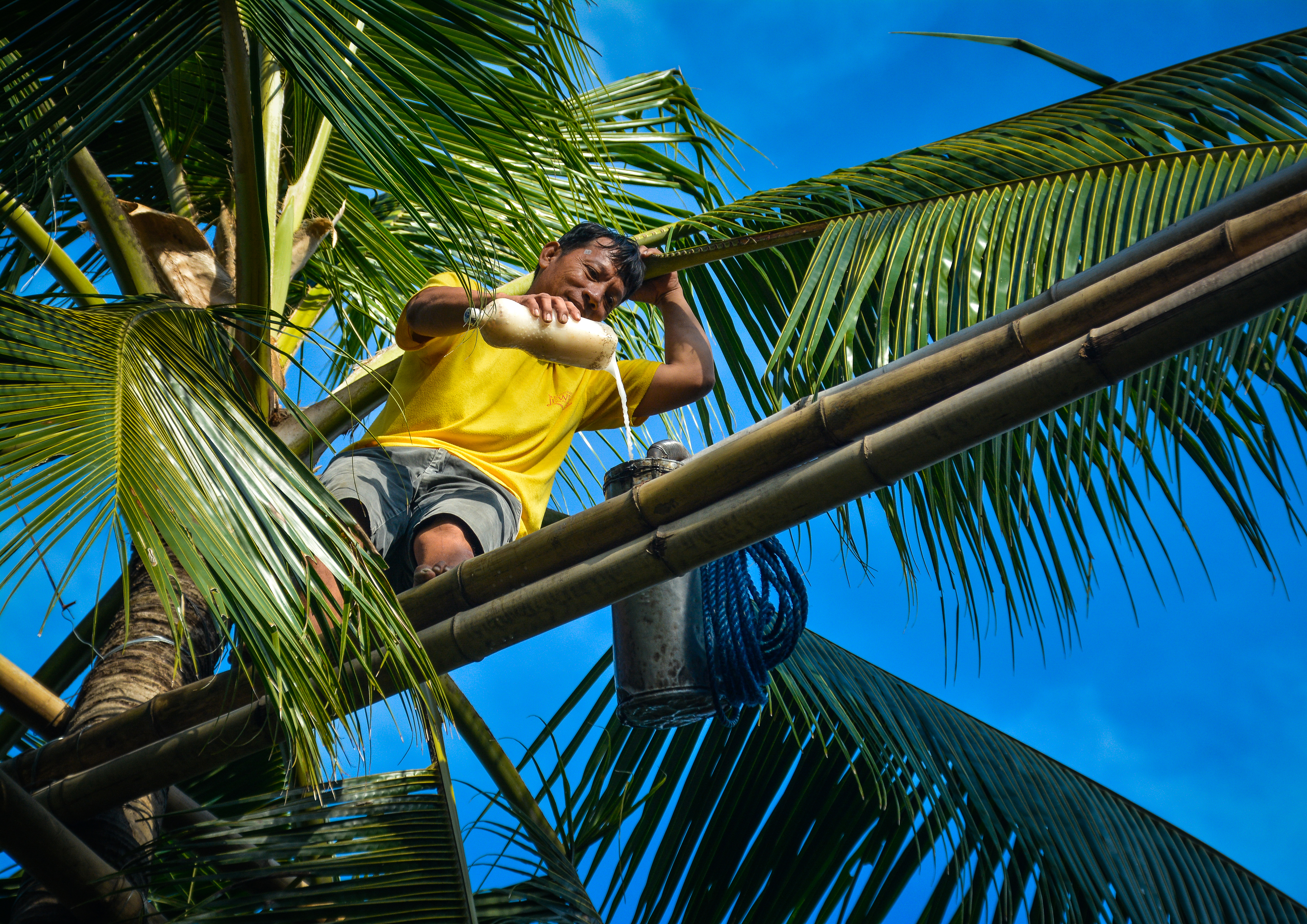
Worker in the Philippines using a bamboo bridge network to collect sweet coconut sap from cut flower stalks to make palm liquor

The pole method uses a long pole with a cutting device at the end. In the Philippines, the traditional tool is called the halabas and is made from a long bamboo pole with a sickle-like blade at its tip. Though safer and faster than climbing, it does not allow workers to examine and clean the crown of coconuts for pests and diseases.

Modern methods use hydraulic elevators mounted on tractors or ladders. Mechanical coconut climbing devices and robots have been developed in India, Sri Lanka, and Malaysia. The Coconut Maturity Detection Project uses imaging and machine learning to identify mature coconut bunches ready for harvesting.

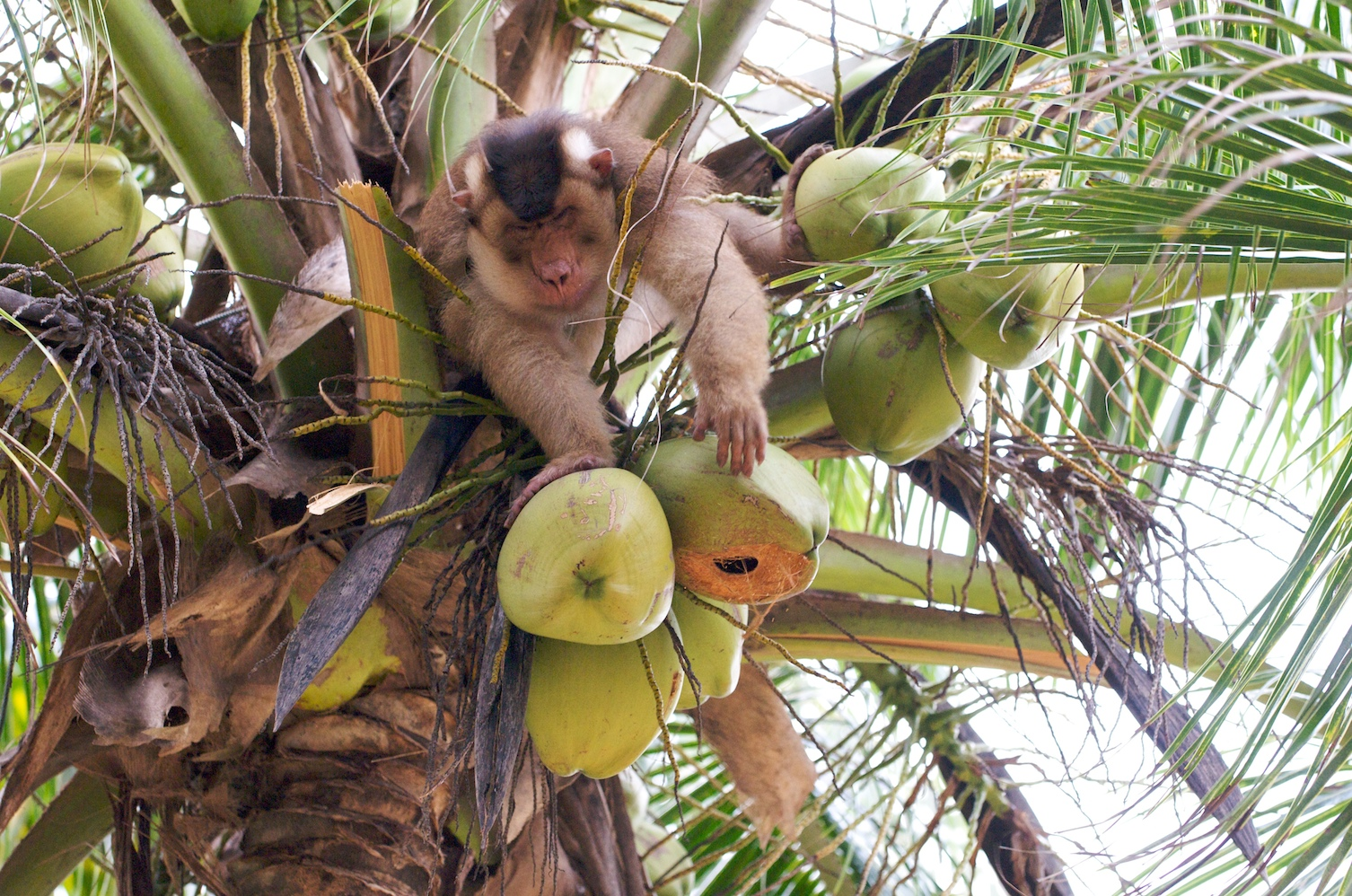
A southern pig-tailed macaque trained to harvest coconuts, Malaysia

A system of bamboo bridges and ladders directly connecting the tree canopies is used in the Philippines for coconut plantations that harvest coconut sap (not fruits) for coconut vinegar and palm wine production. In other areas, as in Papua New Guinea, coconuts are simply collected when they fall to the ground.

Some coconut farmers in Thailand and Malaysia use southern pig-tailed macaques to harvest coconuts. Thailand has been raising and training them to pick coconuts for around 400 years. Training schools for pig-tailed macaques still exist in southern Thailand and in the Malaysian state of Kelantan. People for the Ethical Treatment of Animals (PETA) objected to the Thailand practice in 2019.

Coconuts (in shell) 2024, millions of tonnes
Indonesia	18.0
India	14.7
Philippines	14.5
Brazil	3.2
Sri Lanka	1.8
World	65.5
Source: FAOSTAT of the United Nations

=== Production ===
In 2024, world production of coconuts in shells was 65.5 million tonnes, led by Indonesia, India, and the Philippines, together having 72% of the total (table).

In India, four southern states account for most of India's total production: Tamil Nadu, Karnataka, Kerala, and Andhra Pradesh. Though Kerala has the largest number of coconut trees, Tamil Nadu is the most productive per hectare. The coconut is the official state tree of Kerala, whose name in the local language Malayalam means "coconut land".

The main coconut-producing area in the Middle East is the Dhofar region of Oman. The ancient coconut groves of Dhofar were mentioned by the medieval Moroccan traveler Ibn Battuta in his book The Rihla.

Sri Lanka established its Coconut Development Authority and Coconut Cultivation Board and Coconut Research Institute in the early British Ceylon period.

Yearly per capita supply of coconuts

Production of coconuts

Coconut yield

== Health concerns ==
=== Cardiovascular disease ===
As a rich source of lauric acid and other saturated fats, coconut oil is a dietary risk factor for cardiovascular diseases by elevating blood levels of LDL cholesterol. Many national clinical associations recommend limiting consumption of coconut oil products, replacing them instead with foods containing unsaturated fats.

== Uses ==
The coconut palm is grown throughout the tropics for decoration, as well as for its culinary and nonculinary uses; virtually every part of the coconut palm is used by humans in some manner and has significant economic value. The coconut's versatility is noted in some of its names: in Sanskrit, it is kalpa vriksha ("the tree of the necessities of life"), while in Malay, it is pokok seribu guna ("the tree of a thousand uses"), and in the Philippines, it is called the "tree of life". It is one of the most useful trees in the world.

=== Nutrition ===
Coconut meat, raw
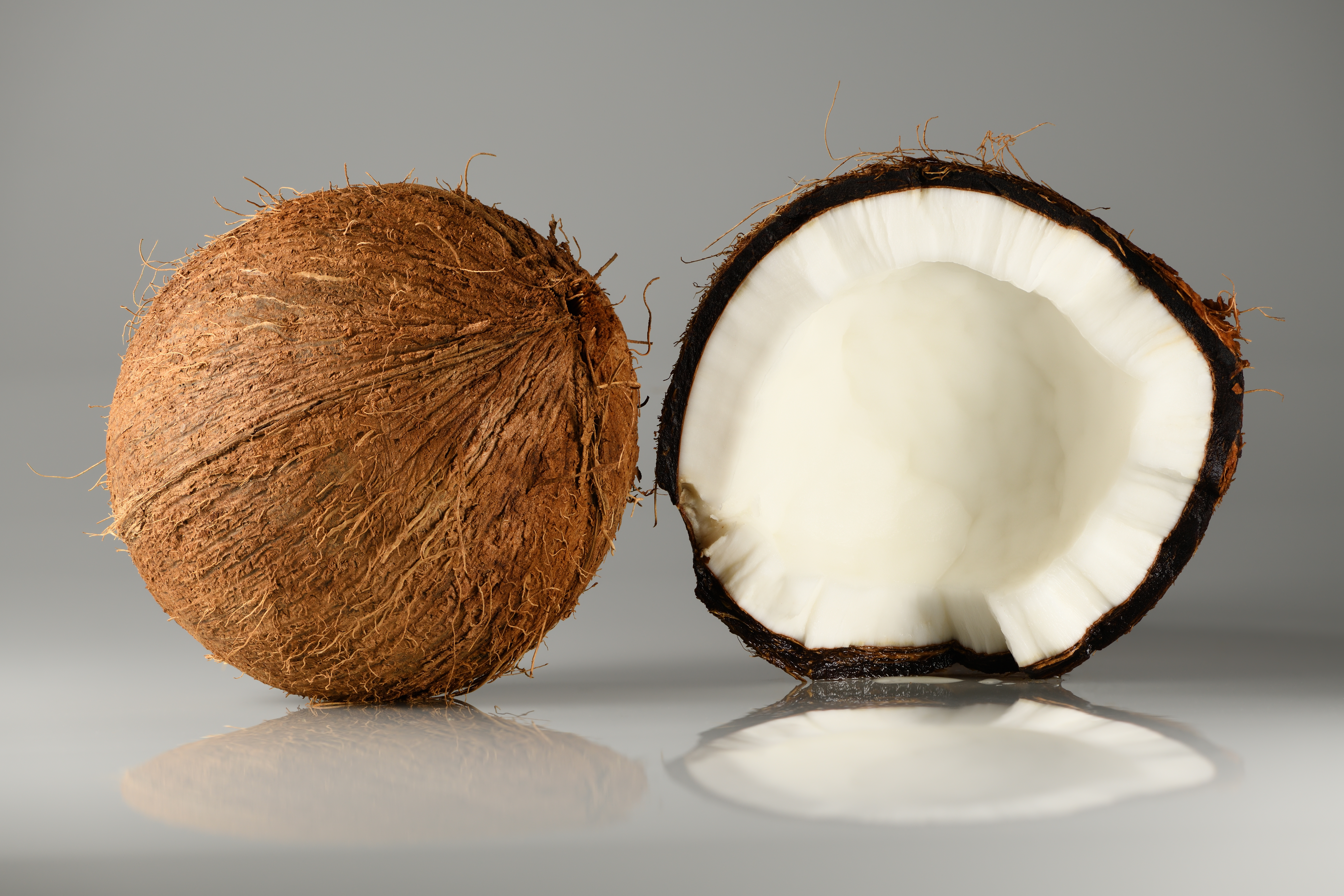

Nutritional value per 100 g (3.5 oz)
- Energy: 1,480 kJ (350 kcal)
- Carbohydrates: 15.23 g
- Sugars: 6.23 g
- Dietary fiber: 9.0 g
- Fat: 33.49 g
- Saturated: 29.698 g
- Monounsaturated: 1.425 g
- Polyunsaturated: 0.366 g
- Protein: 3.33 g
Amino acids
Tryptophan	0.039 g
Threonine	0.121 g
Isoleucine	0.131 g
Leucine	0.247 g
Lysine	0.147 g
Methionine	0.062 g
Cystine	0.066 g
Phenylalanine	0.169 g
Tyrosine	0.103 g
Valine	0.202 g
Arginine	0.546 g
Histidine	0.077 g
Alanine	0.170 g
Aspartic acid	0.325 g
Glutamic acid	0.761 g
Glycine	0.158 g
Proline	0.138 g
Serine	0.172 g
Vitamins and minerals
Vitamins	Quantity %DV^{†}
Thiamine (B1)	6% 0.066 mg
Riboflavin (B2)	2% 0.020 mg
Niacin (B3)	3% 0.540 mg
Pantothenic acid (B5)	6% 0.300 mg
Vitamin B6	3% 0.054 mg
Folate (B9)	7% 26 μg
Vitamin C	4% 3.3 mg
Vitamin E	2% 0.24 mg
Vitamin K	0% 0.2 μg
Minerals	Quantity %DV^{†}
Calcium	1% 14 mg
Copper	48% 0.435 mg
Iron	14% 2.43 mg
Magnesium	8% 32 mg
Manganese	65% 1.500 mg
Phosphorus	9% 113 mg
Potassium	12% 356 mg
Selenium	18% 10.1 μg
Sodium	1% 20 mg
Zinc	10% 1.10 mg
- Other constituents: Quantity
- Water: 47 g
- Link to USDA FoodData Central entry
- ^{†}Percentages estimated using US recommendations for adults, except for potassium, which is estimated based on expert recommendation from the National Academies.

Raw coconut meat is 47% water, 33% fat, 15% carbohydrates, and 3% protein (table). In a reference amount of 100 grams (3.5 oz), raw coconut flesh supplies 350 calories of food energy, and is a rich source (20% or more of the Daily Value, DV) of manganese (65% DV) and copper (48% DV), with various other dietary minerals in moderate amounts (10–18% DV; table). It is a poor source of vitamins. Raw coconut meat has a high content of saturated fatty acids (30% of total fats), with lauric acid as the main saturated fat (15% of total; USDA source in table).

=== Culinary ===
The many culinary uses of coconuts are largely based on the edible white, fleshy part of the seed (the endosperm), known as "coconut meat". The meat of immature coconuts can be eaten as it is or cooked in pastries. Mature coconut meat is tough and is processed before consumption, being made into products like coconut milk, "coconut chips" or grated and dehydrated as "desiccated coconut".

Coconut milk, used for cooking many dishes, is pressed from coconut meat. It can be diluted to create coconut milk beverages such as milk substitutes. Coconut milk powder, a protein-rich powder, can be processed from coconut milk. Coconut milk and coconut cream extracted from grated coconut can be added to desserts and savory dishes, or used in curries and stews. Products made from thickened coconut milk with sugar and eggs, like coconut jam and coconut custard, are widespread in Southeast Asia. Coconut oil is used for frying and cooking.

Coconut water can be drunk fresh or used in cooking. It can be fermented to produce a jelly-like dessert known as nata de coco. Coconut vinegar, made from fermented coconut water or sap, is used extensively in Southeast Asian and Goan cuisine.

Coconut sap, fresh or fermented, is drunk as toddy or tubâ in the Philippines. When left to ferment on its own, it becomes palm wine. Palm wine is distilled to produce arrack. The sap can be reduced by boiling to create a sweet syrup, or reduced further to yield coconut sugar. A young, well-maintained tree can produce around 300 liters (79 U.S. gallons) of toddy per year, while a 40-year-old tree may yield around 400 L (110 US gal).

=== Oil ===
Coconut oil 2023, tonnes
Philippines	1,212,900
Indonesia	646,000
India	549,000
Vietnam	182,000
Mexico	131,000
World	3,122,675
Source: FAOSTAT of the United Nations

In 2023, world production of processed coconut oil was 3.1 million tonnes, led by the Philippines with 38% of the total, and Indonesia and India as secondary producers (table).

Coconut oil is used in cooking, especially for frying. It can be used in liquid form like other vegetable oils, or in solid form like butter or lard. Coconut butter is a solidified coconut oil, but the name is also applied to creamed coconut, a specialty product made of coconut milk solids or puréed coconut meat and oil.

=== Non-food uses ===
Among the many non-food uses of coconut palms, the husk and shells can be used for fuel or made into charcoal. The husks can serve as flotation devices or as an abrasive. The shell, freed from the husk, and heated on warm ashes, exudes an oily material that is used to soothe dental pains in traditional medicine of Cambodia. Coir fiber from husks is used in ropes, mats, brushes, and sacks, as caulking for boats, and as stuffing for mattresses. It is used in horticulture in potting compost, especially in orchid mix, and to make brooms in Cambodia. Coconut cups were frequently carved with scenes in relief and mounted with precious metals. The leaves provide material for baskets and for roofing thatch; they can be woven into mats, cooking skewers, and kindling arrows. Leaves are woven into small pouches that are filled with rice and cooked to make pusô and ketupat.

Hawaiians hollowed out coconut trunks to form drums, containers, or small canoes. The "branches" (leaf petioles) are strong and flexible enough to make a switch. The use of coconut branches in corporal punishment was revived in the Gilbertese community on Choiseul in the Solomon Islands in 2005. The roots are used to make dye, a mouthwash, and a folk medicine for diarrhea and dysentery. A frayed piece of root can be used as a toothbrush. In Cambodia, the roots are used in traditional medicine. Leftover fiber from coconut oil and coconut milk production, coconut meal, is used as livestock feed. The dried calyx is used as fuel in wood-fired stoves. Coconut water is traditionally used as a growth supplement in plant tissue culture and micropropagation.

== In culture ==
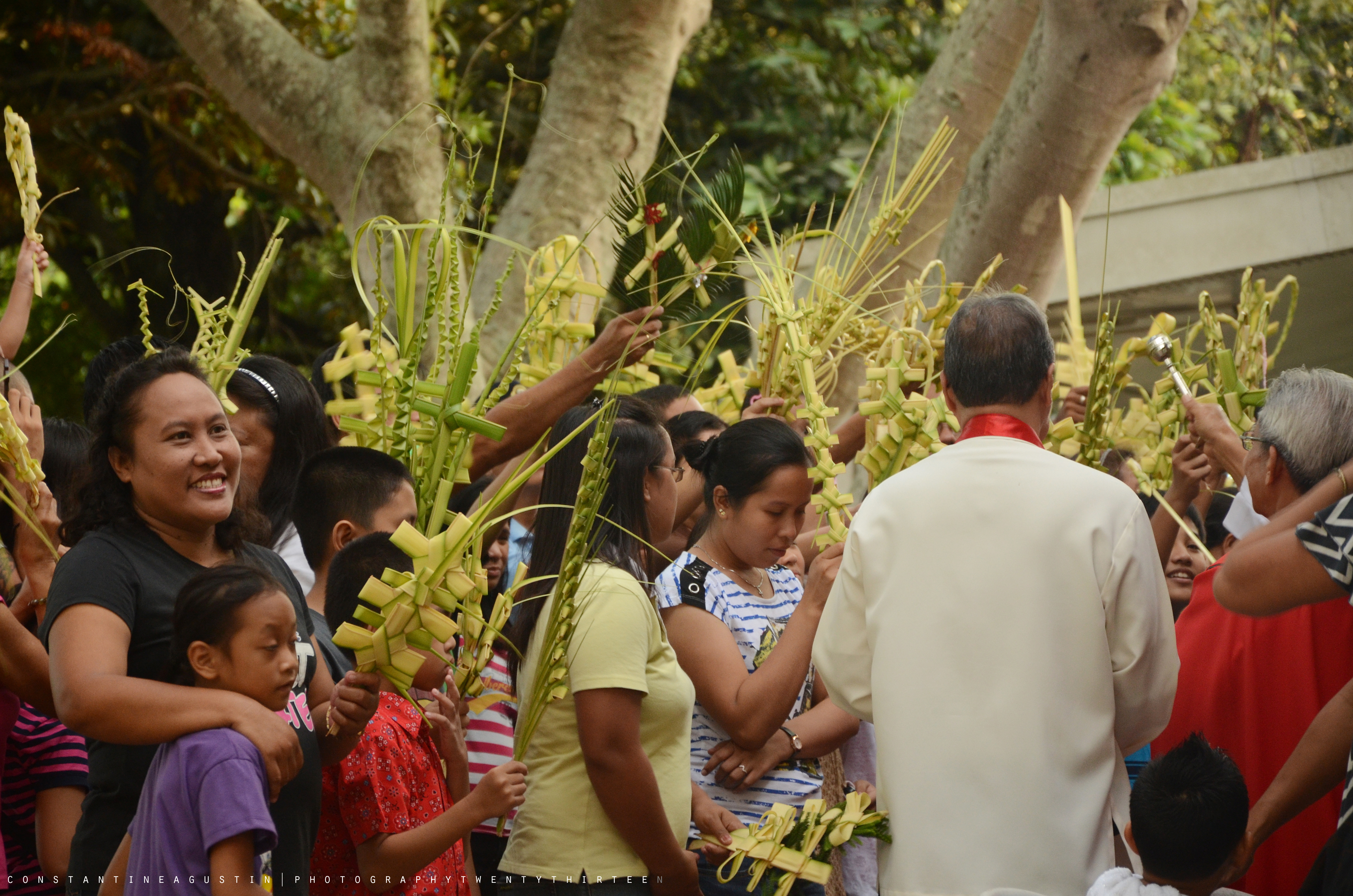
Palaspas, woven palm fronds during Palm Sunday celebrations in the Philippines

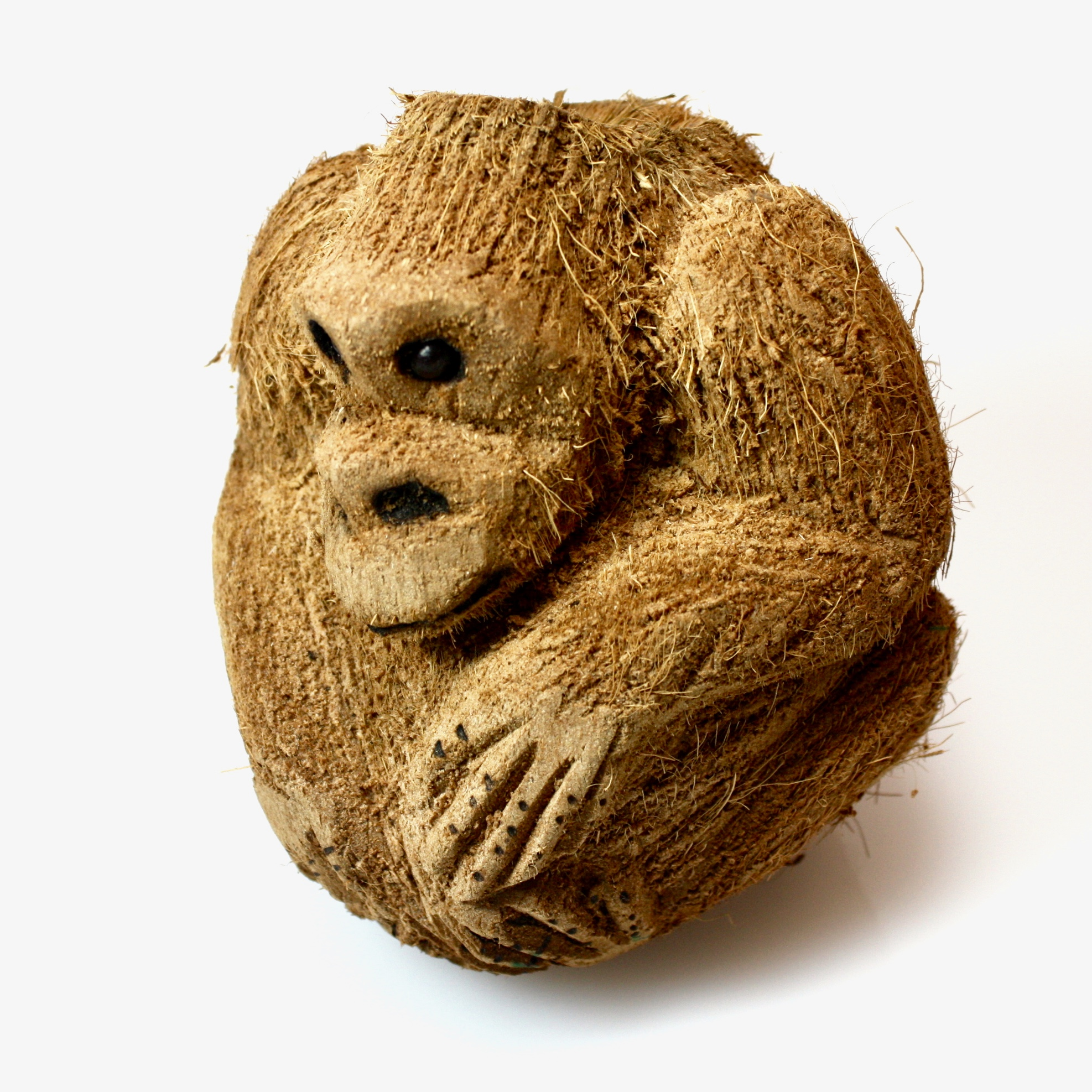
A "coconut monkey" from Mexico, a common souvenir carved from coconut shells

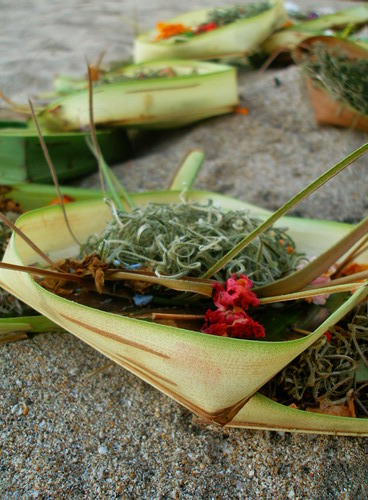
A canang, an offering of flowers, rice, and incense in woven coconut leaves from Bali, Indonesia

A coconut (Sanskrit: narikela) is used in Hindu rituals. Often it is decorated with bright metal foils. It is offered during worship to a Hindu god or goddess. Narali Poornima is celebrated on a full moon day which usually signifies the end of monsoon season in India. The word Narali is derived from Marathi naral, "coconut". Fishermen give an offering of coconut to the sea to celebrate the beginning of a new fishing season, in the hope of bountiful catches. Hindus often initiate any new activity by breaking a coconut to ensure the blessings of the gods. The Hindu goddess of well-being and wealth, Lakshmi, is often shown holding a coconut. They are used in Hindu weddings as a symbol of prosperity. The flowers are used sometimes in wedding ceremonies in Cambodia. The coconut has cultural and religious significance for Austronesian peoples, appearing in their mythologies, songs, and oral traditions.

The Zulu Social Aid & Pleasure Club of New Orleans traditionally throws hand-decorated coconuts, one of the most valuable Mardi Gras souvenirs, to parade revelers. The tradition began in the 1910s, and has continued since. In 1987, a "coconut law" was signed by Governor Edwin Edwards exempting from insurance liability any decorated coconut "handed" from a Zulu float.

The coconut is used as a target and prize in the traditional British fairground game coconut shy. The player buys some small balls which are thrown at coconuts balanced on sticks. The aim is to knock a coconut off the stand and win it.

It was the main food of adherents of the now discontinued Vietnamese Coconut Religion, Đạo Dừa.

=== Myths and legends ===
Some South Asian, Southeast Asian, and Pacific Ocean cultures have origin myths in which the coconut plays the main role. In the Hainuwele myth from Maluku, a girl emerges from the blossom of a coconut tree. In Maldivian folklore, one of the main myths of origin reflects the dependence of the Maldivians on the coconut tree. In the story of Sina and the Eel, the origin of the coconut is related as the beautiful woman Sina burying an eel, which eventually became the first coconut.

According to urban legend, more deaths are caused by falling coconuts than by sharks annually, though the truth is actually the reverse.

=== Early history ===
Literary evidence from the Ramayana and Sri Lankan chronicles indicates that the coconut was present in the Indian subcontinent before the 1st century BCE. The earliest direct description is given by Cosmas Indicopleustes in his Topographia Christiana written around 545, where the coconut is called "the great nut of India". Another early mention is the "One Thousand and One Nights" story of Sinbad the Sailor, who bought and sold a coconut during his fifth voyage.

In March 1521, Antonio Pigafetta described the coconut in his journal in Italian with the word "cocho", plural "cochi". This followed the first European crossing of the Pacific Ocean during the Magellan circumnavigation. He explained how at Guam "they eat coconuts" ("mangiano cochi") and that the natives there "anoint the body and the hair with coconut and beniseed oil" ("ongieno el corpo et li capili co oleo de cocho et de giongioli").

== See also ==
- Domesticated plants and animals of Austronesia
- Central Plantation Crops Research Institute
- Coconut production in Kerala
- Coir Board of India
