= Creamed coconut =

Food product

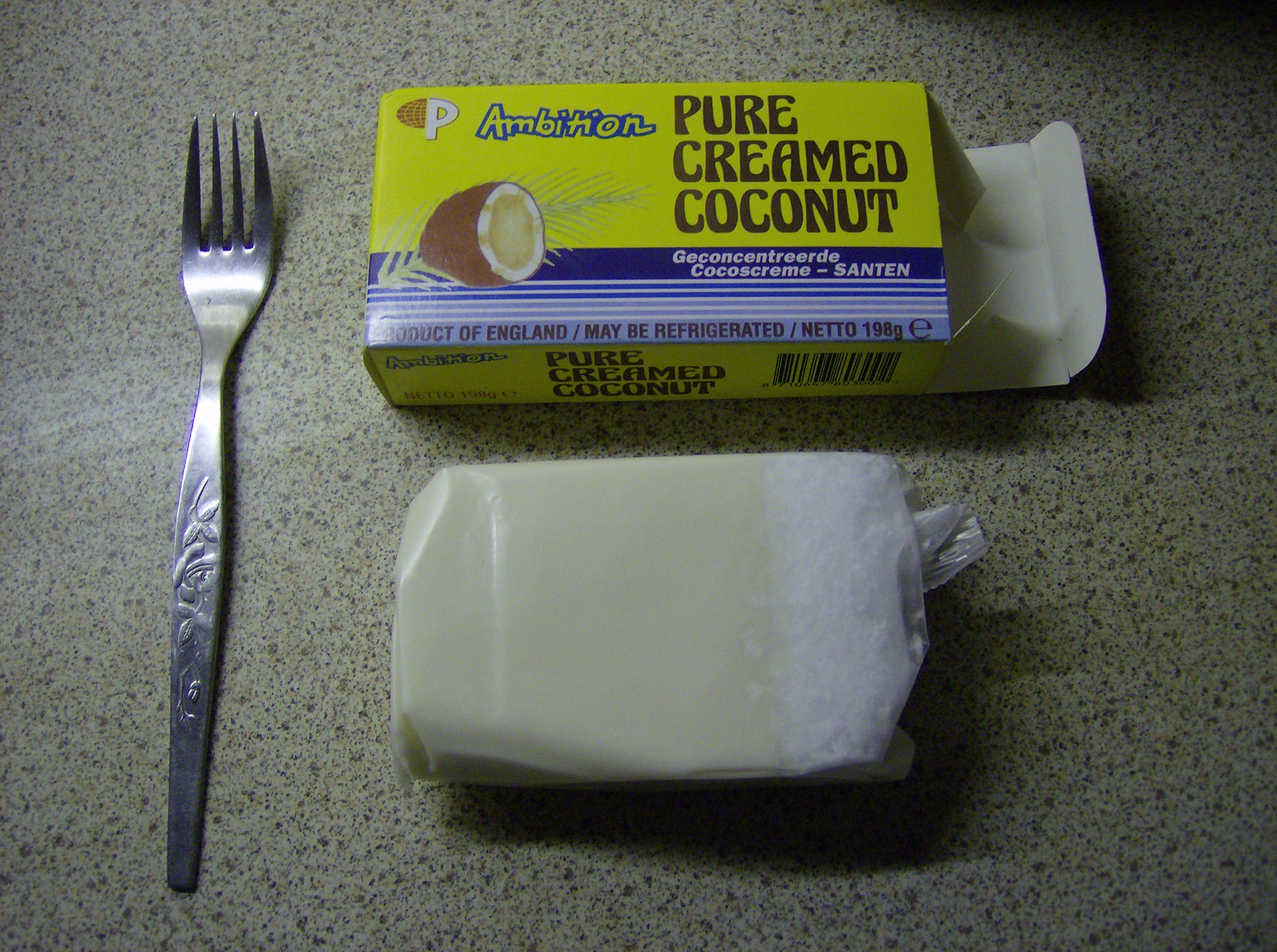
Creamed coconut

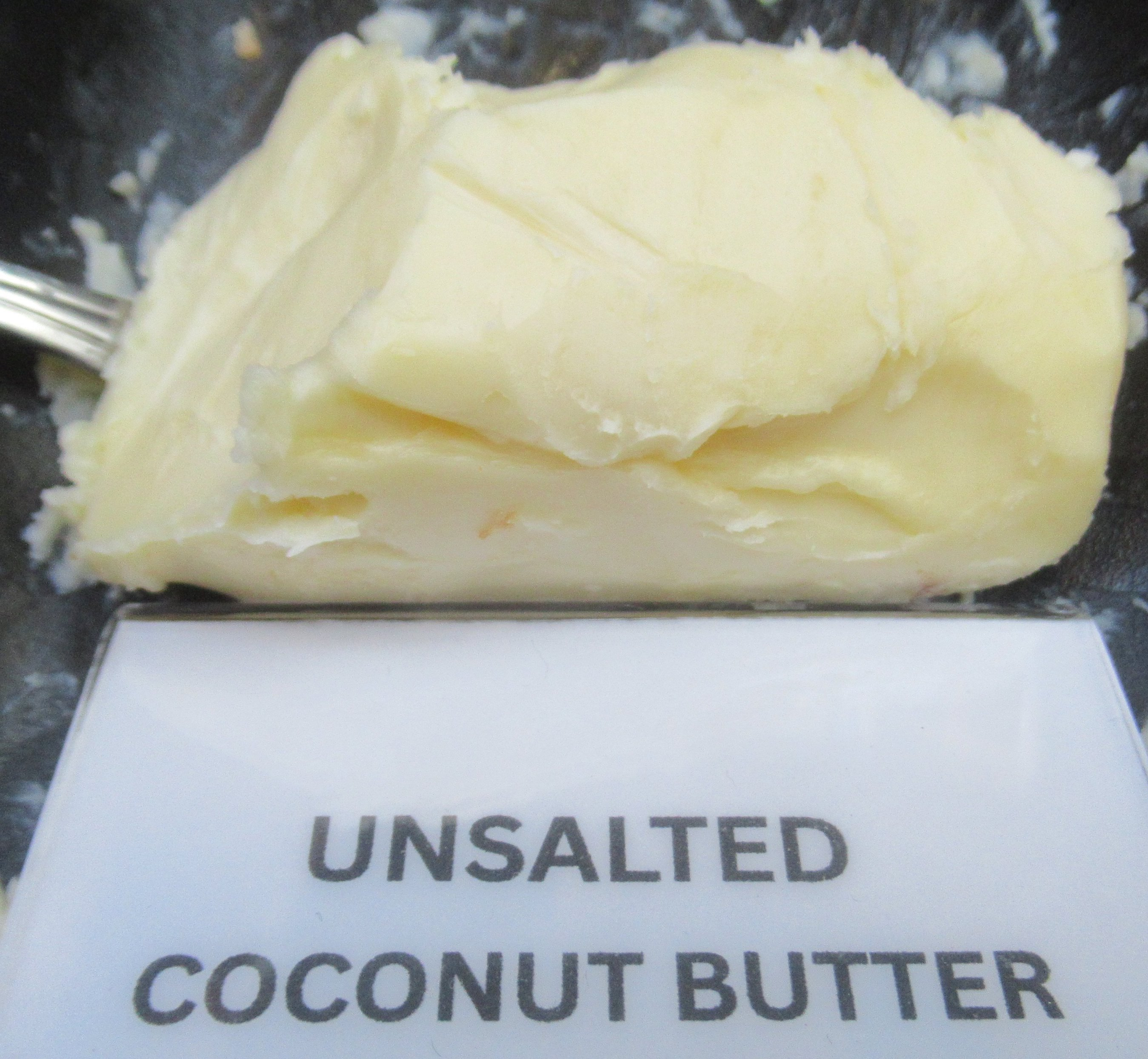
Filipino cuisine spread

Creamed coconut, also known as coconut butter, is a coconut product made from the unsweetened dehydrated fresh pulp of a mature coconut, ground to a semi-solid white creamy paste. It is sold in the form of a hard white block which can be stored at room temperature. (Coconut butter melts at around 24°C, so in warmer weather it is a liquid paste.) The block is generally packaged in a sealed plastic pouch and some separation of the fat and the coconut flesh can be seen. It may also come in bottles similar to how most nut butters are packaged. In cookery, it is chopped into pieces or grated before it is added to dishes. By adding warm water it can be made into coconut milk or coconut cream substitutes. Adding water to creamed coconut in the ratio 5:2 gives a coconut cream substitute, 5:1 gives a coconut milk substitute.

Creamed coconut, or coconut butter can also be made by placing unsweetened shredded coconut into the bowl of a food processor and processing on high speed for 10 to 15 minutes.

Creamed coconut is added to Indian, South East Asian and Caribbean recipes to enrich curries and sauces. In the west, it is primarily used in confectionery items, desserts, ice cream, and sauces. Creamed coconut should not be confused with the related coconut cream, which is a liquid extracted from coconut pulp but does not include the coconut pulp itself.

Creamed coconut is particularly high in saturated fat (61% of total composition), and provides 684 calories in a reference amount of 100 grams (3.5 oz). Values per 100g:

- Water: 2 g
- Protein: 5 g
- Carbohydrate: 22 g
- Fats: 69 g

== See also ==
- Coco Lopez
- Coconut cream
- Coconut milk
- Coconut oil
- Coconut water
