= Maypan coconut palm =

Hybrid palm

Maypan is an F1 hybrid coconut palm that was developed by the Research Department of the Coconut Industry Board of Jamaica to be resistant to Lethal Yellowing disease. It was created experimentally in 1962 by cross pollinating two varieties of Cocos nucifera and, after extensive disease exposure and yield performance trials, was named and released in 1974 when a suitable method of mass controlled pollination had been devised. A DwarfxTall hybrid, the Malayan Dwarf seed parents, grown in an isolated seed garden and kept constantly emasculated, are regularly pollinated by blowing a mixture of talc and pollen collected from selected palms of a variety known locally as Panama Tall. This combination gives the Maypan an LY disease resistance approaching that of the Malayan Dwarf and much of the windstorm tolerance of the Panama Tall. It grows to approximately 18 meters in height. The LY resistance of the Maypan, of both of its parents, and of other coconut varieties generally, has been called into question since the 1990s but Maypan, and F1 hybrids using the same types of parents, are still the planting material of choice in the Caribbean and Latin American countries where LY occurs.
