= Lethal yellowing =

Plant disease

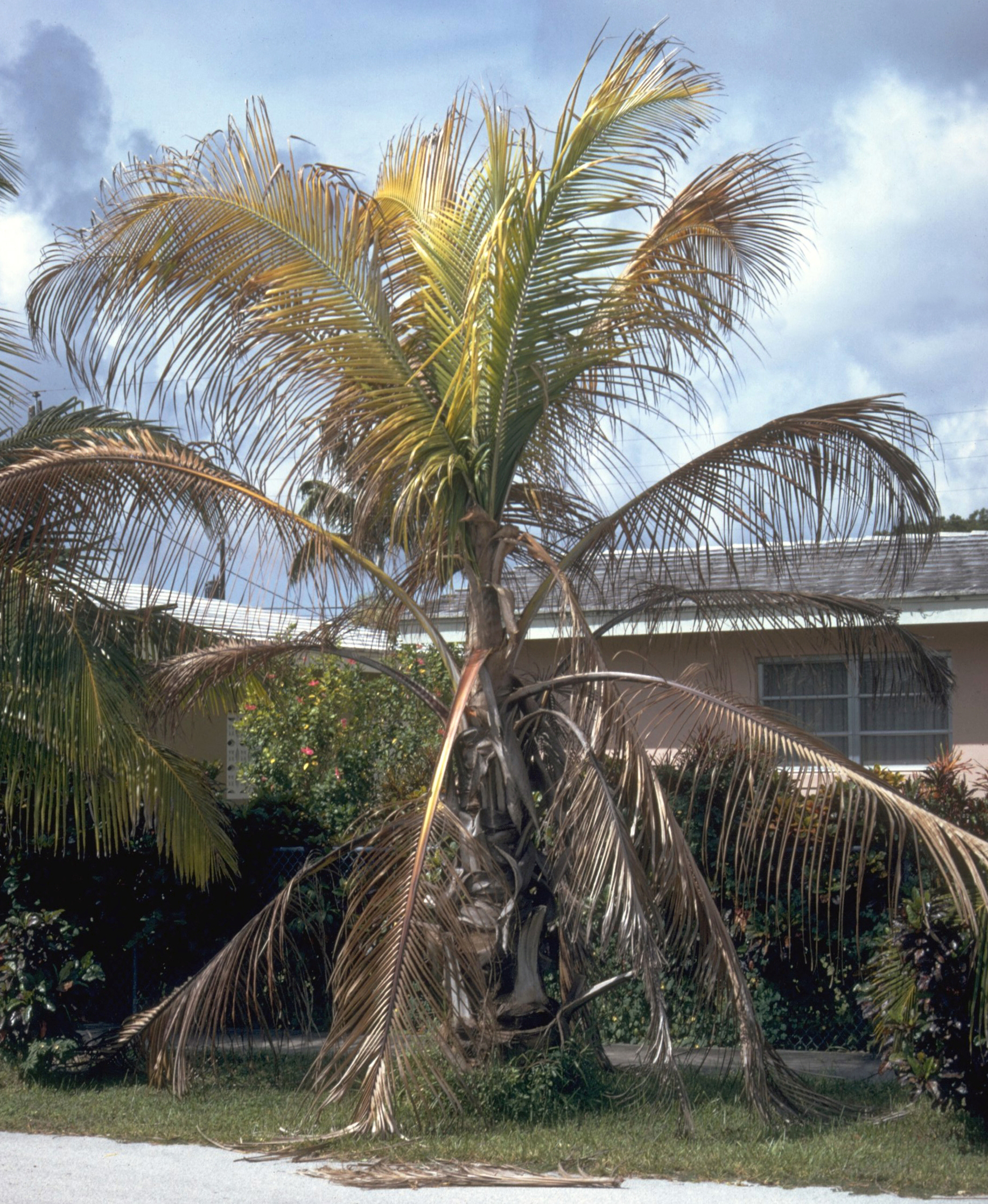
- Palm tree dying of lethal yellowing
- Common names: Coconut lethal yellowing phytoplasma
- Causal agents: Phytoplasma sp
- Hosts: Arecaceae (palms)
- Vectors: planthoppers (Haplaxius crudus)
- EPPO Code: PHYP56
- Distribution: Florida, parts of the Caribbean, parts of Australia and Central America, East Africa

Lethal yellowing (LY) is a phytoplasma disease that attacks many species of palms, including some commercially important species, such as the coconut and date palm. In the Caribbean, it is spread by the planthopper Haplaxius crudus (former name Myndus crudus) which is native to Florida, parts of the Caribbean, parts of Australia and Central America. The only effective cure is prevention, e.g., planting resistant varieties of coconut palm and preventing a park-like or golf-course-like environment which attracts the planthopper. Some cultivars, such as the Jamaica Tall coconut cultivar, nearly died out because of lethal yellowing. Heavy turf grasses and similar green ground cover attracts the planthopper to lay its eggs there, and the nymphs develop at the roots of these grasses. The planthoppers' eggs and nymphs can pose a great threat to coconut-growing countries' economies, especially ones into which grass seeds for golf courses and lawns are imported from the Americas.

It is not clearly understood how the disease was spread to East Africa, as the planthopper Haplaxius crudus is not native to East Africa. The most likely explanation is that it was imported with grass seed from Florida that was used to create golf courses and lawns in beach resorts. There is a direct connection between green lawns and the spread of lethal yellowing in Florida. Even so-called 'resistant cultivars' such as the Malayan Dwarf or the Maypan hybrid between that dwarf and the Panama Tall were never claimed to have a 100% immunity.

The nymphs of the planthoppers develop on the roots of grasses, hence areas of grass in the vicinity of palm trees are connected with the spread of this phytoplasma disease. The problem arose as a direct result of using coconut and date palms for ornamental and landscaping purposes in lawns, golf courses and gardens, together with these grasses. When these two important food palms were grown in traditional ways (without grasses) in plantations and along the shores, the palm groves were not noticeably affected by lethal yellowing. There is no evidence that disease can be spread when instruments used to cut an infected palm are then used to cut or trim a healthy one. Seed transmission has never been demonstrated, although the phytoplasma can be found in coconut seednuts, but phytosanitary quarantine procedures that prevent movement of coconut seed, seedlings and mature palms out of an LY epidemic area should be applied to grasses and other plants that may be carrying infected vectors.

Beside coconut palm (Cocus nucifera), more than 30 palm species have also been reported as susceptible to lethal phytoplasmas around the globe.

== See also ==
- Texas phoenix palm decline
- Plant health
