= List of Cixiidae genera =

These 232 genera belong to the family Cixiidae, cixiid planthoppers. There are at least 2,500 described species in Cixiidae.

== Cixiidae genera ==
- Achaebana Attie, Bourgoin & Bonfils, 2002^{c g}
- Achaemenes Stål, 1866^{c g}
- Adolendana Distant, 1917^{c g}
- Afroreptalus van Stalle, 1986^{c g}
- Aka de Laubenfels, 1936^{i c g}
- Amazobenna Penny, 1980^{c g}
- Andes Stål, 1866^{c g}
- Andixius Emeljanov & Hayashi, 2007^{c g}
- Anila Distant, 1906^{c g}
- Ankistrus Tsaur & Hsuan Stalle, 1991^{c g}
- Anoculiarus Dlabola, 1985^{c g}
- Antillixius Myers, 1928^{c g}
- Apartus Holzinger, 2002^{c g}
- Arosinus Emeljanov, 2007^{c g}
- Aselgeoides Distant, 1917^{c g}
- Asotocixius Kramer, 1983^{c g}
- Ateson Metcalf, 1938^{g}
- Atonurus Emeljanov, 1993^{c g}
- Atretus Emeljanov, 2007^{c g}
- Aubirestus Löcker & Larivière, 2006^{c g}
- Aulocorypha Berg, 1879^{c g}
- Autrimpus Szwedo, 2004^{c g}
- Bajauana Distant, 1907^{c g}
- Balticixius Lefebvre, Bourgoin & Nel, 2007^{c g}
- Balyadimetopia Löcker & Larivière, 2006^{c g}
- Bangoliarus ^{c g}
- Barbonia Löcker & Larivière, 2006^{c g}
- Benna Walker, 1856^{c g}
- Bennarella Muir, 1930^{c g}
- Bennaria Melichar, 1914^{c g}
- Betacixius Matsumura, 1914^{c g}
- Bodecia Walker, 1868^{c g}
- Borbonomyndus Attié, Bourgoin & Bonfils, 2002^{c g}
- Borysthenes Stål, 1866^{c g}
- Bothriobaltia Szwedo, 2002^{c g}
- Bothriocera Burmeister, 1835^{c g b}
- Bothrioceretta Caldwell, 1950^{c g}
- Brixia Stål, 1856^{c g}
- Brixidia Haglund, 1899^{c g}
- Caffrocixius ^{c g}
- Cajeta Stål, 1866^{c g}
- Calamister Kirkaldy, 1906^{c g}
- Candicarina Löcker & Larivière, 2006^{c g}
- Caneirona Distant, 1916^{c g}
- Canobenna ^{c g}
- Caravella Emeljanov, 2007^{c g}
- Carolus Kirkaldy, 1906^{c g}
- Celebenna Hoch & Wessel, 2011^{c g}
- Cermada Emeljanov, 2000^{c g}
- Chathamaka Larivière, 1999^{c g}
- Chidea Emeljanov, 2000^{c g}
- Chlorodus ^{c g}
- Cibrica Emeljanov, 2007^{c g}
- Cicerama Emeljanov, 2007^{c g}
- Cixiosoma Berg, 1879^{c g}
- Cixius Latreille, 1804^{c g b}
- Clarabenna ^{c g}
- Colvanalia Muir, 1925^{c g}
- Confuga Fennah, 1975^{c g}
- Cordobenna ^{c g}
- Cordoliarus Löcker, 2006^{c g}
- Corylonga Löcker & Fletcher, 2006^{c g}
- Cotyleceps Uhler, 1895^{g}
- Cretofennahia Martins-Neto & Szwedo, 2007^{c g}
- Cubana Uhler, 1895^{c g}
- Cubanella Fennah, 1948^{c g}
- Cyclobenna ^{c g}
- Cyclopoliarus Fennah, 1945^{c g}
- Dentobenna ^{c g}
- Diastrocixius Caldwell, 1944^{c g}
- Dilacreon Fennah, 1980^{c g}
- Dorialus van Stalle, 1986^{c g}
- Duilius Stal, 1858^{c g}
- Dysoliarus Fennah, 1949^{c g}
- Dystheatias Kirkaldy, 1907^{c g}
- Epoliarus Matsumura, 1910^{c g}
- Eucarpia Walker, 1857^{c g}
- Eumecurus Emeljanov, 1971^{c g}
- Eumyndus Synave, 1956^{c g}
- Euryphlepsia Muir, 1922^{c g}
- Ferricixius Hoch & Ferreira, 2012^{c g}
- Fipsianus Holzinger, 2009^{c g}
- Flachaemus van Stalle, 1989^{c g}
- Fletcherolus Löcker & Larivière, 2006^{c g}
- Fuscobenna ^{c g}
- Gelastocaledonia Löcker & Larivière, 2006^{c g}
- Gelastocephalus Kirkaldy, 1906^{c g}
- †Glisachaemus Szwedo, 2007^{c g}
- Goniobenna ^{c g}
- Gonophallus Tsaur & Hsuan Stalle, 1991^{c g}
- Gurrundus Löcker & Larivière, 2006^{c g}
- Guttala Löcker & Larivière, 2006^{c g}
- Haplaxius Fowler, 1904^{c g b}
- Hartliebia Löcker & Larivière, 2006^{c g}
- Helenolius van Stalle, 1986^{c g}
- Holgus Löcker & Larivière, 2006^{c g}
- Huttia Myers, 1924^{c g}
- Hyalesthes Signoret, 1865^{c g}
- Ibleocixius D'Urso & Grasso, 2009^{c g}
- Indolipa Emeljanov, 2001^{c g}
- Innobindus Jacobi, 1928^{c g}
- Iolania Kirkaldy, 1902^{i c g}
- Ithma Fennah, 1969^{c g}
- Jonabenna ^{c g}
- Karebodopoides Szwedo, 2001^{c g}
- Kibofascius van Stalle, 1986^{c g}
- Kinabenna ^{c g}
- Kirbyana Distant, 1906^{c g}
- Koroana Myers, 1924^{c g}
- Kotonisia Matsumura, 1938^{c g}
- Kulickamia Gebicki & Szwedo, 2000^{c g}
- Kuvera Distant, 1906^{c g}
- Lalobidius van Stalle, 1985^{c g}
- Larivierea Löcker & Fletcher, 2006^{c g}
- Leades Jacobi, 1928^{c g}
- Leptolamia Metcalf, 1936^{c g}
- Lipsia Löcker & Fletcher, 2006^{c g}
- Loisirella Holzinger, Holzinger & Egger, 2013^{c g}
- Macrocixius Matsumura, 1914^{c g}
- Madangabenna ^{c g}
- Malpha Myers, 1924^{c g}
- Malukubenna ^{c g}
- Manurevana Hoch, 2006^{c g}
- Meenocixius Attié, Bourgoin & Bonfils, 2002^{c g}
- Melandeva ^{c g}
- Melanoclypeus Löcker & Fletcher, 2006^{c g}
- Melanoliarus Fennah, 1945^{c g b}
- Mesoliarus Matsumura, 1910^{c g}
- Metaplacha Emeljanov, 2000^{c g}
- Miclucha Emeljanov, 2001^{c g}
- Microledrida Fowler, 1904^{c g b}
- Minabenna ^{c g}
- Mnaomaia Szwedo, Bourgoin & Lefebvre, 2006^{c g}
- Mnasthaia Szwedo, Bourgoin & Lefebvre, 2006^{c g}
- Mnemosyne Stål, 1866^{c g}
- Monomalpha Emeljanov, 2000^{c g}
- Monorachis Uhler, 1901^{c g b}
- Muirolonia Metcalf, 1936^{c g}
- Mundopa Distant, 1906^{c g}
- Mundopoides Fennah, 1987^{g}
- Myndodus Emeljanov, 1993^{c g}
- Myndus Stål, 1862^{c g}
- Nanocixius Wagner, 1939^{c g}
- Narravertus van Stalle, 1986^{c g}
- Negrobenna ^{c g}
- Neocarpia Tsaur & Hsu, 2003^{c g}
- Neocixius Wagner, 1939^{c g}
- Nesochlamys Kirkaldy, 1907^{c g}
- Nesoliarus Kirkaldy, 1909^{c g}
- Nesomyndus Jacobi, 1917^{c g}
- Nivcentia Holzinger, 2004^{c g}
- Noabennarella Holzinger & Kunz, 2006^{c g}
- Norialsus van Stalle, 1986^{c g}
- Nothocharis Muir, 1925^{c g}
- Notocixius Fennah, 1965^{c g}
- Notolathrus Marino de Remes Lenicov, 1993^{c g}
- Novotarberus Löcker & Fletcher, 2006^{c g}
- Nymphocixia Van Duzee, 1923^{c g b}
- Nymphomyndus Emeljanov, 2007^{c g}
- Oecleopsis Emeljanov, 1971^{c g}
- Oecleus Stål, 1862^{c g b}
- Oeclixius Fennah, 1963^{c g}
- Oliarellus Emeljanov, 1971^{c g}
- Oliarissa Fennah, 1945^{c g}
- Oliaronus Ball, 1934^{c g b}
- Oliarus Stål, 1862^{i c g}
- Oligocixia Gebicki & Wegierek, 1993^{c g}
- Olipa Emeljanov, 2001^{c g}
- Oliparisca Emeljanov, 2001^{c g}
- Orphninus Emeljanov, 2000^{c g}
- Oteana Hoch, 2006^{c g}
- Ozoliarus Löcker, 2006^{c g}
- Pachyntheisa Fowler, 1904^{c g}
- Papuabenna ^{c g}
- Parandes Muir, 1925^{c g}
- Parasemo Larivière, 1999^{c g}
- Payastylus Löcker & Fletcher, 2006^{c g}
- Peartolus van Stalle, 1986^{c g}
- Pentastira Kirschbaum, 1868^{c g}
- Pentastiridius Kirschbaum, 1868^{c g b}
- Perindus Emeljanov, 1989^{c g}
- Perkunus Szwedo & Stroinski, 2007^{c g}
- Phytocentor Fennah, 1980^{c g}
- Pinacites ^{c g}
- Pintalia Stal, 1862^{c g b}
- Platycixius Van Duzee, 1914^{c g b}
- Plecophlebus ^{c g}
- Proclytus Emeljanov, 2007^{c g}
- Prosops Buckton, 1893^{c g}
- Pseudoliarus Haupt, 1927^{c g}
- Pterolophus Emeljanov, 2013^{c g}
- Reptalus Emeljanov, 1971^{c g}
- Rhamphixius Fowler, 1900^{c g}
- Rhigedanus Emeljanov, 2000^{c g}
- Rhyobenna ^{c g}
- Rokebia Löcker & Fletcher, 2006^{c g}
- Romabenna ^{c g}
- Ronaldia Emeljanov, 2000^{c g}
- Sanghabenna ^{c g}
- Sardocixius Holzinger, 2002^{c g}
- Schuerrera Löcker & Fletcher, 2006^{c g}
- Semicixius Tsaur & Hsuan Stalle, 1991^{c g}
- Semo Buchanan White, 1879^{c g}
- Setapius Dlabola, 1988^{c g}
- Silangobenna ^{c g}
- Simplicixius Holzinger, 2002^{c g}
- Singabenna ^{c g}
- Siniarus Emeljanov, 2007^{c g}
- Sinubenna ^{c g}
- Solonaima Kirkaldy, 1906^{c g}
- Sphaerocixius Wagner, 1939^{c g}
- Stalisyne Szwedo, Bourgoin & Lefebvre, 2006^{c g}
- Stegocixius Kramer, 1983^{c g}
- Stenophlepsia Muir, 1922^{c g}
- Striabenna ^{c g}
- Suriola Emeljanov, 1993^{c g}
- Tachycixius Wagner, 1939^{c g}
- Taomma Emeljanov, 2007^{c g}
- Thaumatobenna ^{c g}
- Tiriteana Myers, 1924^{c g}
- Torrebenna ^{c g}
- Trigonocranus Fieber, 1875^{c g}
- Trirhacus Fieber, 1876^{c g}
- Tsauria Koçak & Kemal, 2009^{c g}
- Typhlobrixia Synave, 1953^{c g}
- Undarana Hoch & Howarth, 1989^{c g}
- Urvillea Kirkaldy, 1907^{c g}
- Volcanalia Distant, 1917^{c g}
- Wernindia Löcker & Fletcher, 2006^{c g}
- Yanganaka Löcker, 2015^{c g}
- Yarnikada Löcker & Fletcher, 2006^{c g}
- Zeoliarus Larivière & Fletcher, 2008^{c g}

Data sources: i = ITIS, c = Catalogue of Life, g = GBIF, b = Bugguide.net
