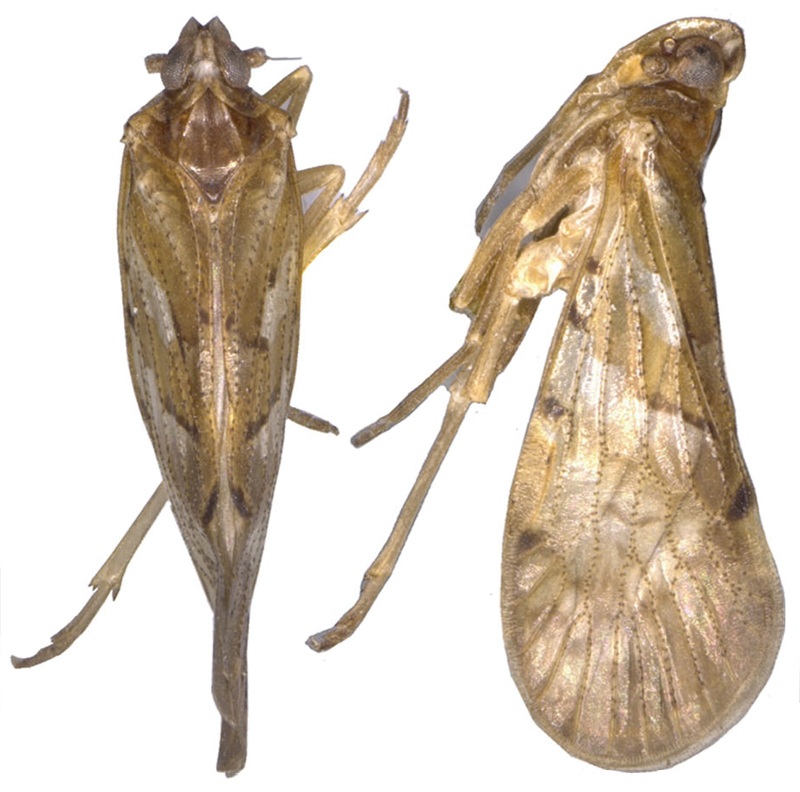

Scientific classification
- Kingdom: Animalia
- Phylum: Arthropoda
- Clade: Pancrustacea
- Class: Insecta
- Order: Hemiptera
- Suborder: Auchenorrhyncha
- Infraorder: Fulgoromorpha
- Family: Cixiidae
- Genus: Andixius
- Species: A. trifurcus

Binomial name
- Andixius trifurcus Zhi & Chen, 2018 in Zhi et al., 2018

= Andixius trifurcus =

Species of true bug

Andixius trifurcus is a species of planthopper belonging to the family Cixiidae. It is endemic to Yunnan, China.

The females are larger than the males, having a body lengths of 7.9–8.2 mm (0.31–0.32 in) and 6.4–6.8 mm (0.25–0.27 in), respectively. Both sexes have yellow-brown bodies and dark brown to black antennae. Their eyes are brown, translucent, and have a yellow ocelli. Unlike the similar-looking Andixius longispinus, they have larger brown markings on the wings and lack a tan spot.
