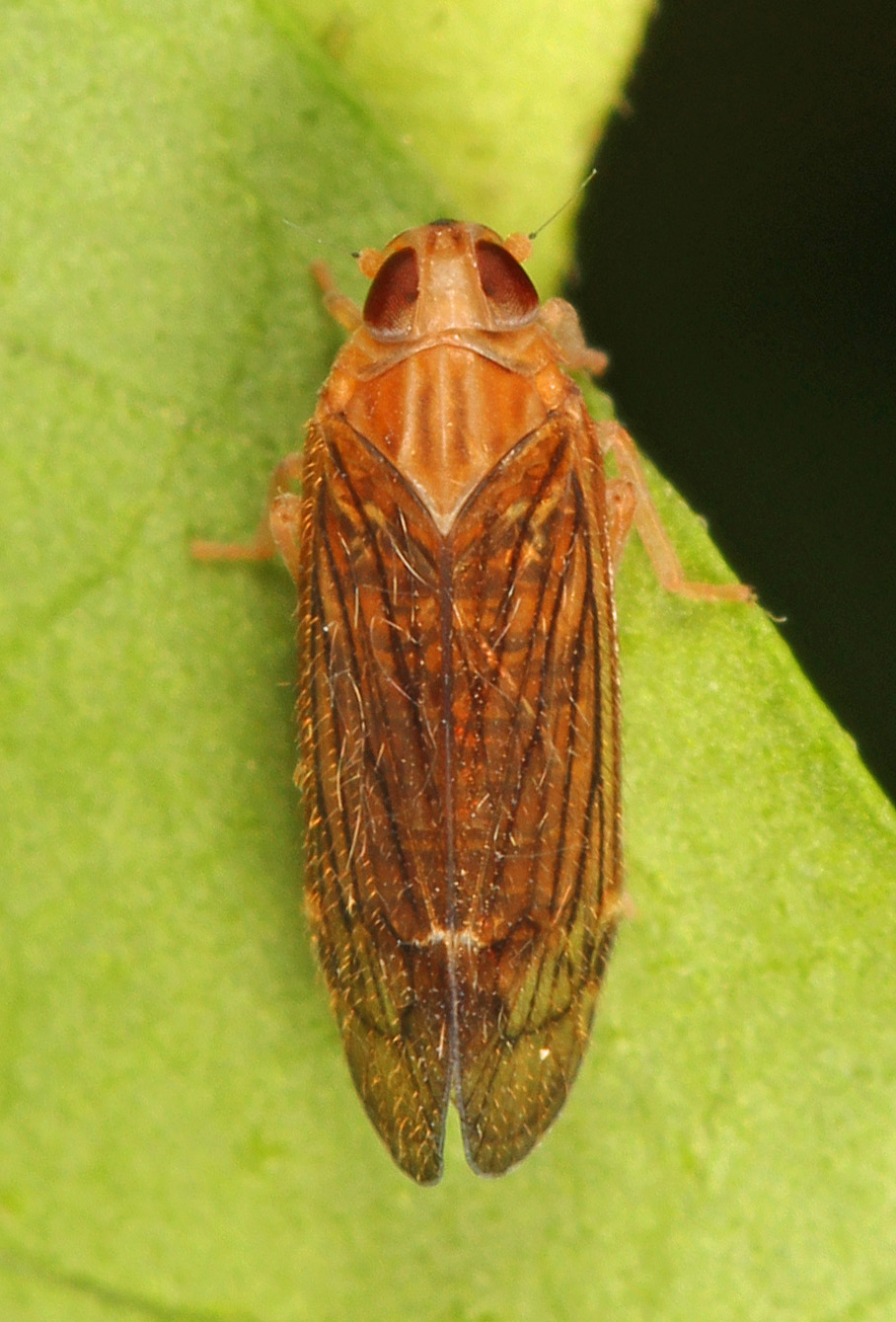

Scientific classification
- Kingdom: Animalia
- Phylum: Arthropoda
- Clade: Pancrustacea
- Class: Insecta
- Order: Hemiptera
- Suborder: Auchenorrhyncha
- Infraorder: Fulgoromorpha
- Family: Cixiidae
- Genus: Haplaxius
- Species: H. pictifrons

Binomial name
- Haplaxius pictifrons (Stål, 1862)

= Haplaxius pictifrons =

Species of true bug

Haplaxius pictifrons is a species of cixiid planthopper in the family Cixiidae.
