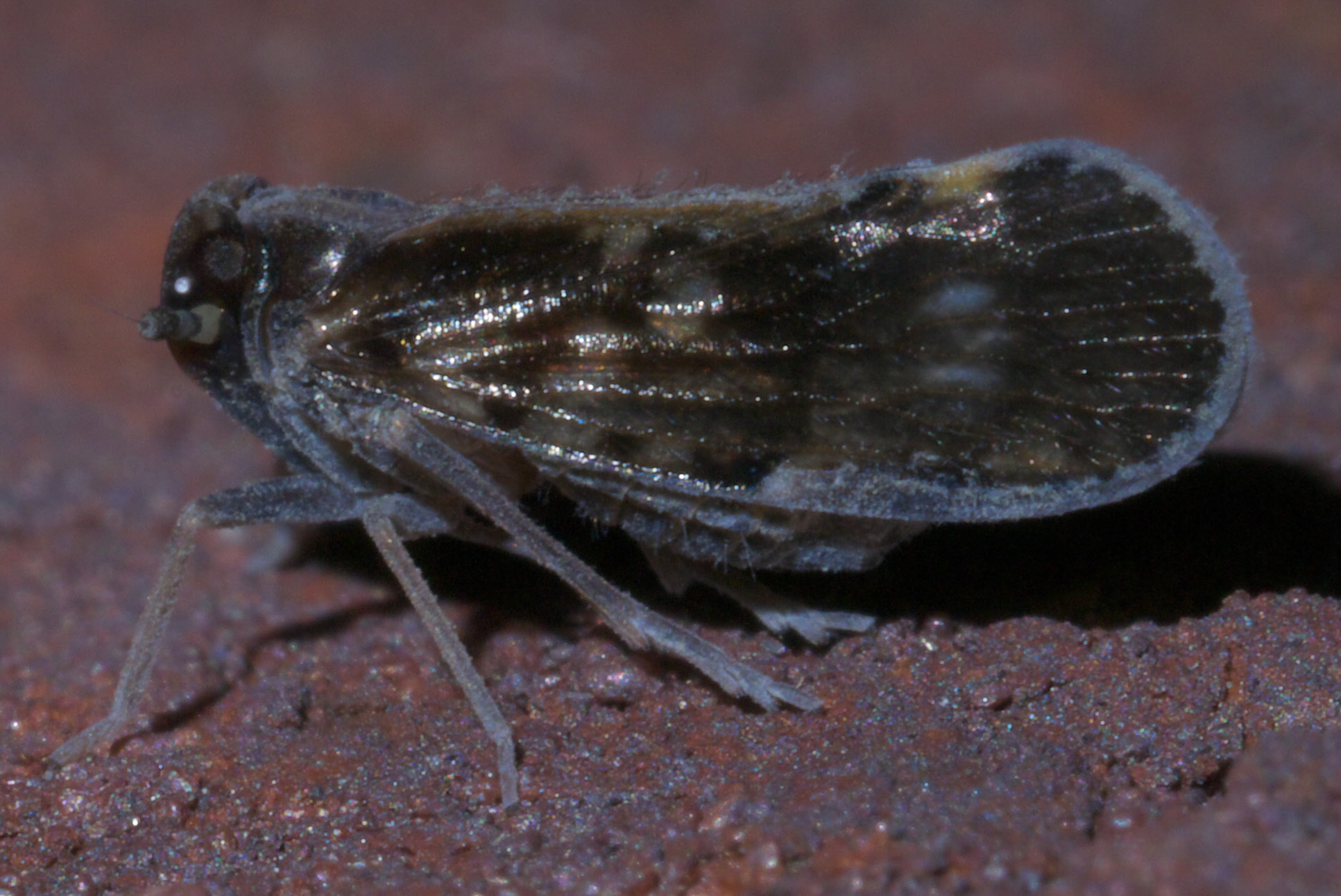

Scientific classification
- Domain: Eukaryota
- Kingdom: Animalia
- Phylum: Arthropoda
- Class: Insecta
- Order: Hemiptera
- Suborder: Auchenorrhyncha
- Infraorder: Fulgoromorpha
- Family: Cixiidae
- Genus: Pintalia
- Species: P. vibex

Binomial name
- Pintalia vibex Kramer, 1983

= Pintalia vibex =

Species of true bug

Pintalia vibex is a species of cixiid planthopper in the family Cixiidae.
