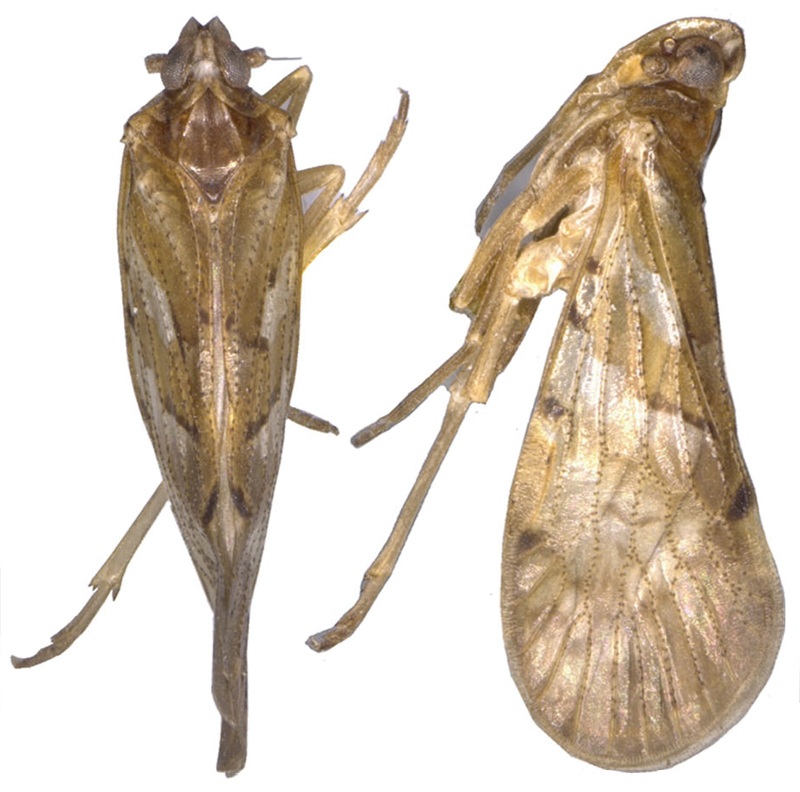
- Andixius trifurcus

Scientific classification
- Kingdom: Animalia
- Phylum: Arthropoda
- Clade: Pancrustacea
- Class: Insecta
- Order: Hemiptera
- Suborder: Auchenorrhyncha
- Infraorder: Fulgoromorpha
- Family: Cixiidae
- Tribe: Andini
- Genus: Andixius; Emeljanov & Hayashi, 2007

Type species
- Andixius nupta Emeljanov & Hayashi, 2007

Diversity
- 4 species

= Andixius =

Genus of true bugs

Andixius is a genus of planthoppers in the family Cixiidae. The genus contains 14 species. The majority of the species are found in China, but one species occurs in Taiwan and one in Japan. The genus name is combination of the generic names Andes and Cixius.

== Description ==
Head distinctly narrower. Clypeus with distinct median carina. Legs simple. Tegmina long and tectiform.

== Species ==
There are 14 accepted species:

- Andixius biprocessus Lv, Chen & Yang, 2026 – China
- Andixius crispiprocessus Lv, Chen & Yang, 2026 – China
- Andixius cultratus Wang, Zhi & Chen, 2020 – China
- Andixius flagellihamus Wang & Chen, 2023 – China
- Andixius gracilispinus Wang & Chen, 2023 – China
- Andixius lii Lv, Chen & Yang, 2026 – China
- Andixius lingulatus Wang, Zhi & Chen, 2020 – China
- Andixius longispinus Zhi & Chen, 2018 – China
- Andixius nupta Emeljanov & Hayashi, 2007 – Japan
- Andixius productus Wang & Chen, 2023 – China
- Andixius trifurcus Zhi & Chen, 2018 – China
- Andixius truncatus Wang & Chen, 2023 – China
- Andixius uncinulatus Lv, Chen & Yang, 2026 – China
- Andixius venustus (Tsaur & Hsu, 1991) – Taiwan
