= Solonaima bifurca =

Scientific classification
- Domain: Eukaryota
- Kingdom: Animalia
- Phylum: Arthropoda
- Class: Insecta
- Order: Hemiptera
- Suborder: Auchenorrhyncha
- Infraorder: Fulgoromorpha
- Family: Cixiidae
- Genus: Solonaima
- Species: S. bifurca

Binomial name
- Solonaima bifurca Hoch, 1988

Species of leafhopper

Solonaima bifurca is a species of leafhopper in the family, Cixiidae, first described by Hannelore Hoch in 1988.

The species is known only from Lamington National Park, Queensland.
