= Andixius nupta =

Scientific classification
- Kingdom: Animalia
- Phylum: Arthropoda
- Clade: Pancrustacea
- Class: Insecta
- Order: Hemiptera
- Suborder: Auchenorrhyncha
- Infraorder: Fulgoromorpha
- Family: Cixiidae
- Genus: Andixius
- Species: A. nupta

Binomial name
- Andixius nupta Emeljanov & Hayashi, 2007

Species of true bug

Andixius nupta is a species of planthopper belonging to the family Cixiidae. It is endemic to the Ryukyu Islands of Japan, with records from Amami Ōshima and Okinawa Islands.

Males measure 5.9–6.2 mm (0.23–0.24 in) and females 6.6–7.4 mm (0.26–0.29 in) in length. Body and antennae are yellowish brown. Left side of periandrium has a bifurcate process medially. Left-ventral margin has a reversed process.
