= Andixius venustus =

Scientific classification
- Kingdom: Animalia
- Phylum: Arthropoda
- Clade: Pancrustacea
- Class: Insecta
- Order: Hemiptera
- Suborder: Auchenorrhyncha
- Infraorder: Fulgoromorpha
- Family: Cixiidae
- Genus: Andixius
- Species: A. venustus

Binomial name
- Andixius venustus (Tsaur & Hsu, 1991)

Synonyms
- Brixia venusta Tsaur & Hsu, 1991

Species of true bug

Andixius venustus is a species of planthopper belonging to the family Cixiidae. It is endemic to Taiwan.

Body and antennae are yellowish brown. A large bifurcate process is found on right side of flagellum. Left side of periandrium has a medium process apically.
