= Brixia =

Brixia may refer to:

- Brescia, an Italian city referred to in Latin as Brixia
- Brixia (planthopper), an insect genus
- Brixia Model 35, a mortar
- 521 Brixia, a minor planet orbiting the Sun
