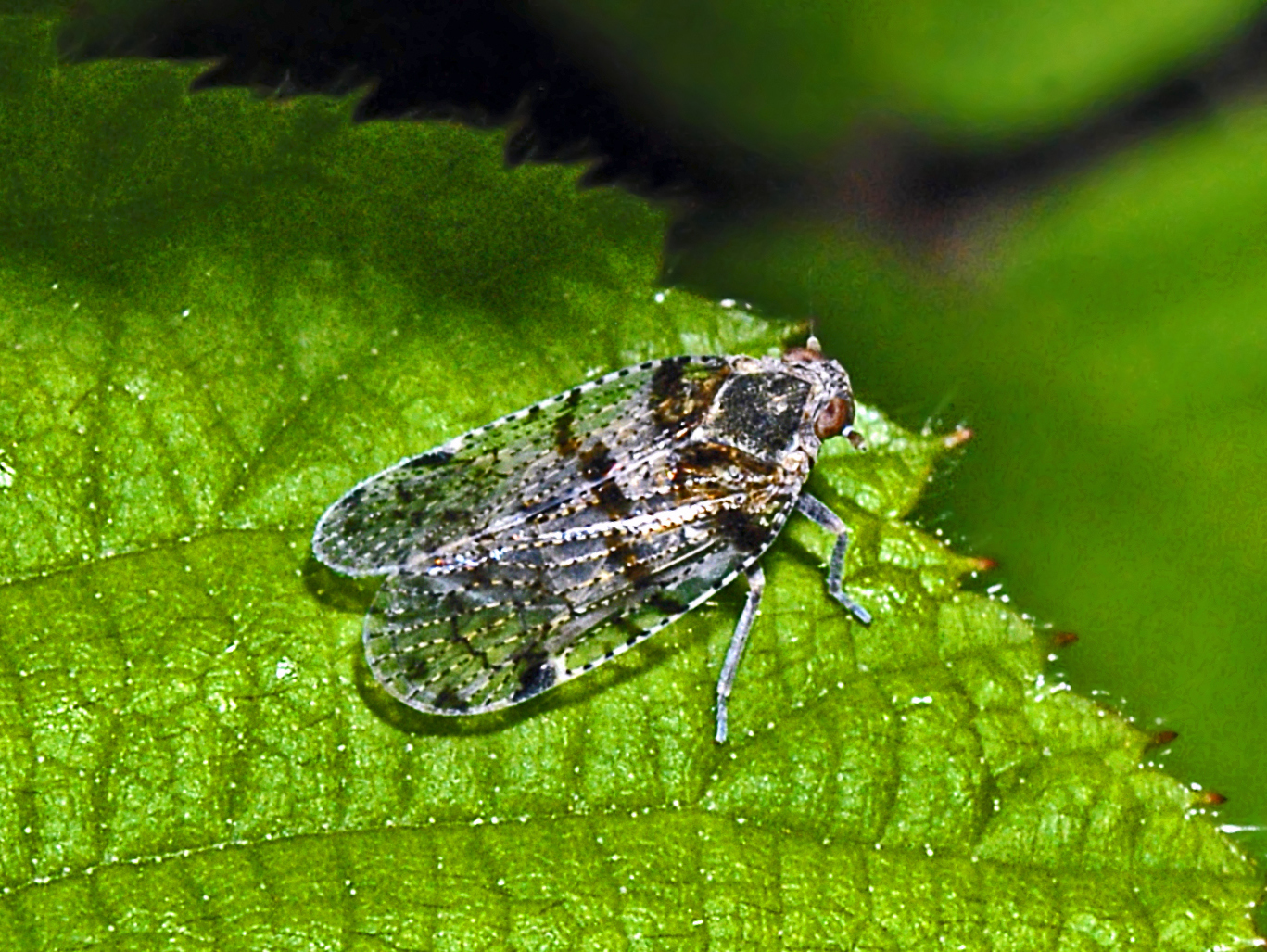
- Cixius cf C. nervosus, dorsal view

Scientific classification
- Kingdom: Animalia
- Phylum: Arthropoda
- Class: Insecta
- Order: Hemiptera
- Suborder: Auchenorrhyncha
- Infraorder: Fulgoromorpha
- Family: Cixiidae
- Genus: Cixius
- Species: C. nervosus

Binomial name
- Cixius nervosus (Linnaeus, 1758)

= Cixius nervosus =

Species of true bug

Cixius nervosus is a species of planthoppers in the tribe Cixiini.

== Subspecies ==
- Cixius nervosus longispinus Wagner, 1955
- Cixius nervosus nervosus (Linnaeus, 1758)
- Cixius nervosus obscurus China, 1942

== Description ==
Cixius nervosus can reach a length of 6.5–7.5 millimetres (0.26–0.30 in) in males, of 7–8.5 millimetres (0.28–0.33 in) in females. These large planthoppers show three keels on the scutellum. The front wings are transparent, with two dark brown band and faint brown markings posteriorly. Dark spots there are along the costal margin and smaller spots on veins.

Adults can be found from May to October.

== Distribution ==
This widespread species is present in most of Europe, the East Palearctic realm, and the Nearctic realm.

== Habitat ==
These common planthoppers live on deciduous trees, on hedge rows and in meadows and scrublands.
