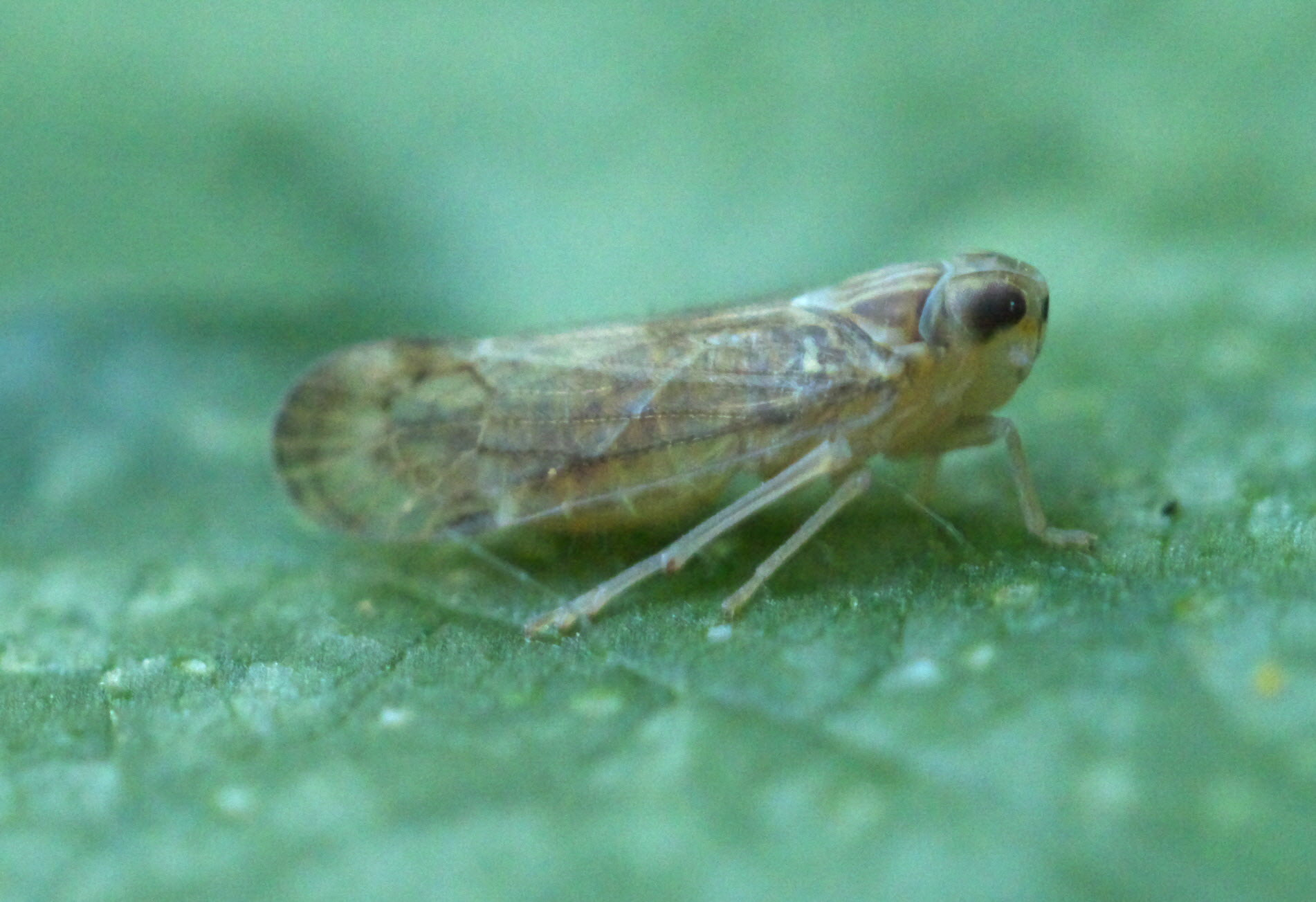

Scientific classification
- Domain: Eukaryota
- Kingdom: Animalia
- Phylum: Arthropoda
- Class: Insecta
- Order: Hemiptera
- Suborder: Auchenorrhyncha
- Infraorder: Fulgoromorpha
- Family: Cixiidae
- Tribe: Oecleini
- Genus: Haplaxius; Fowler, 1904

Species
- See text

= Haplaxius =

Genus of true bugs

Haplaxius is a genus of cixiid planthoppers in the family Cixiidae. There are at least 60 described species in Haplaxius.

Haplaxius crudus is the vector of the coconut lethal yellowing plant disease.

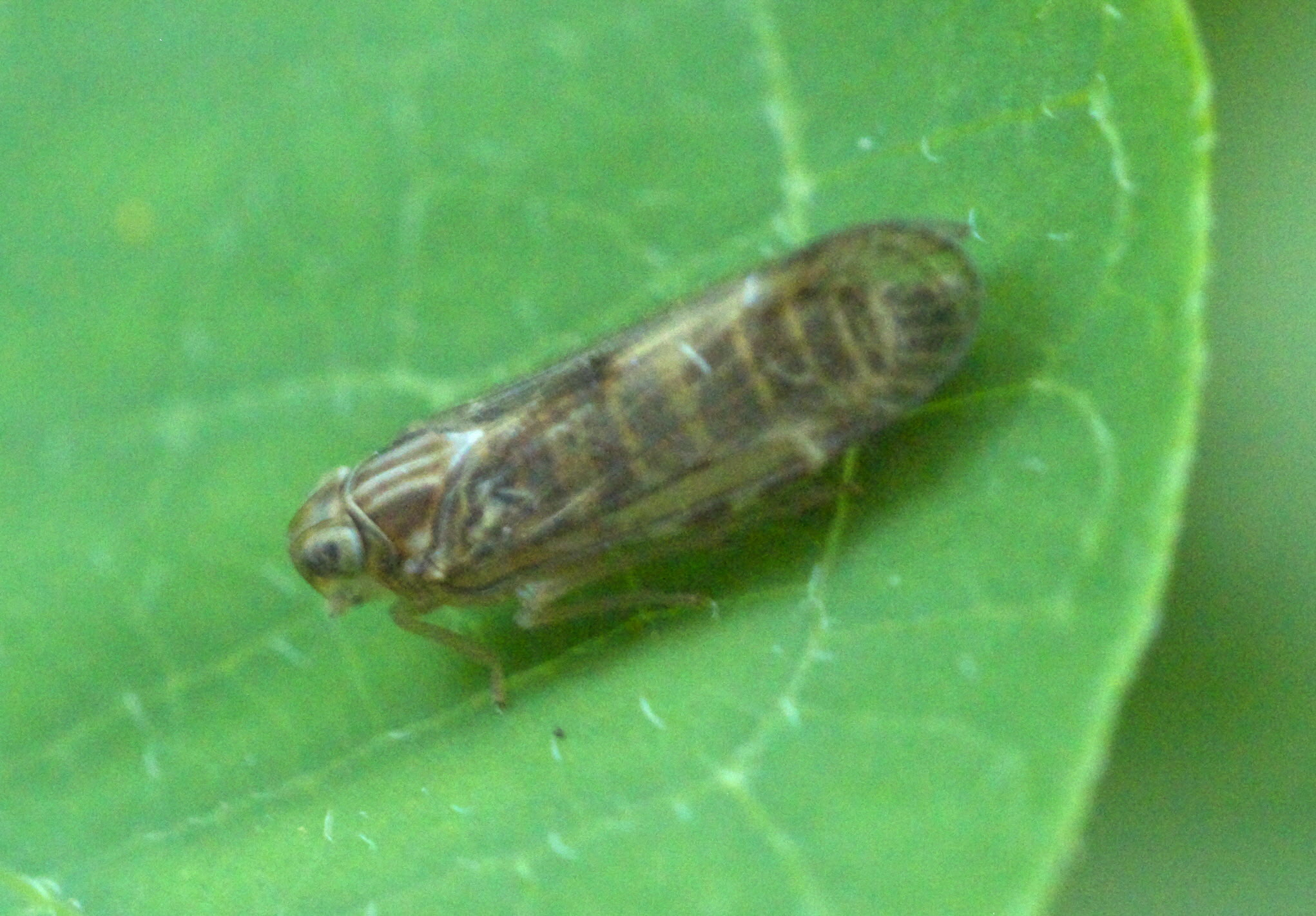
Haplaxius

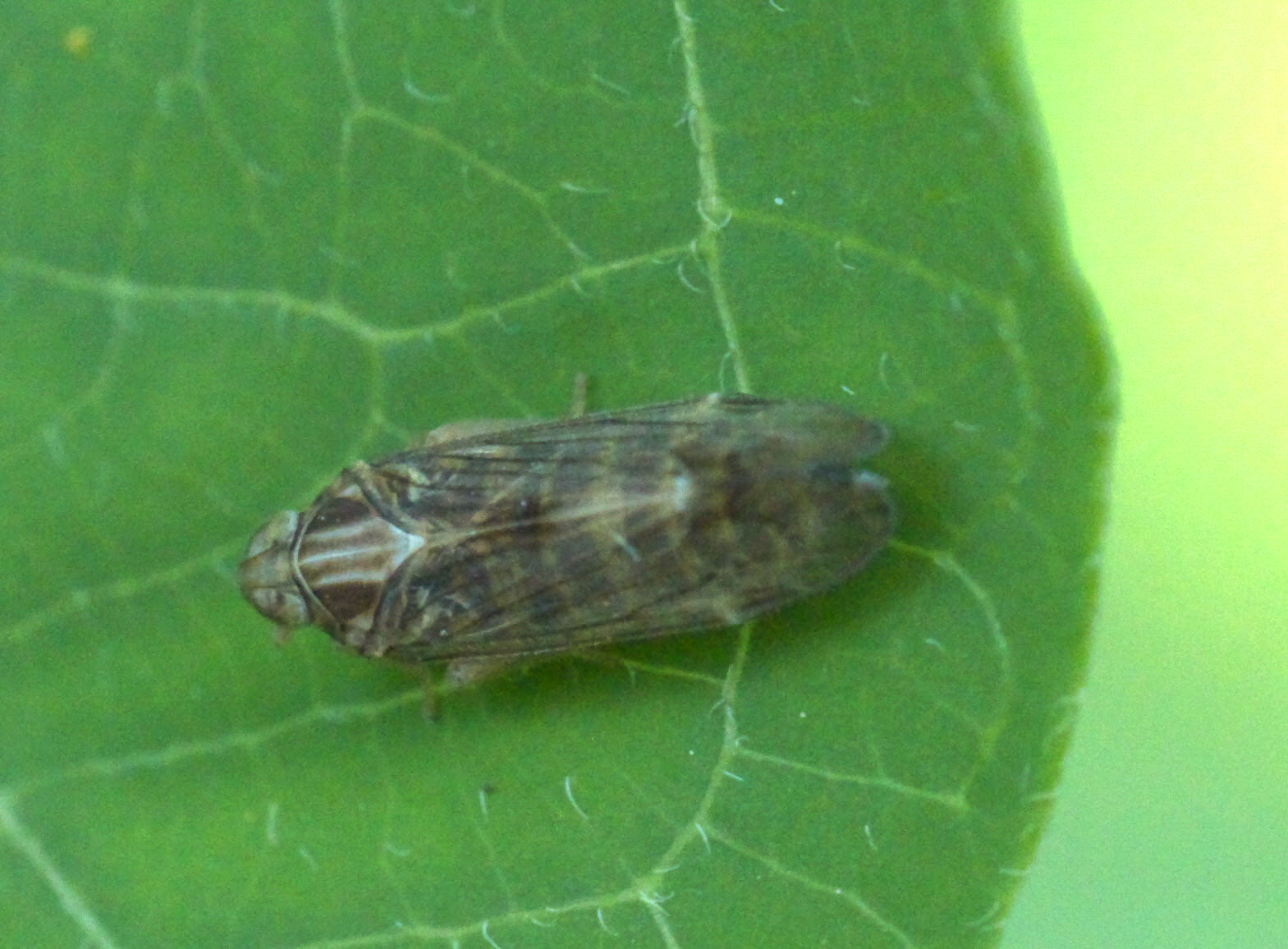
Haplaxius

== Species ==
These 62 species belong to the genus Haplaxius:

- Haplaxius akko (Kramer, 1979)^{c g}
- Haplaxius balli (Kramer, 1979)^{c g}
- Haplaxius beameri (Ball, 1933)^{c g}
- Haplaxius brimosis (Kramer, 1979)^{c g}
- Haplaxius cabrerensis Ferreira, Mc Kamey & Martinez, 2010^{c g}
- Haplaxius caldwelli (Kramer, 1979)^{c g}
- Haplaxius catalinus (Ball, 1933)^{c g b}
- Haplaxius collinus (Ball, 1933)^{c g}
- Haplaxius crena (Kramer, 1979)^{c}
- Haplaxius crudus (Van Duzee, 1907)^{c g}
- Haplaxius deleter (Kramer, 1979)^{c g}
- Haplaxius delta (Kramer, 1979)^{c g}
- Haplaxius dolon (Kramer, 1979)^{c g}
- Haplaxius dozieri (Kramer, 1979)^{c g}
- Haplaxius enotatus (Van Duzee, 1909)^{c g}
- Haplaxius fennahi (Kramer, 1979)^{c g}
- Haplaxius flocki (Kramer, 1979)^{c g}
- Haplaxius frontalis Fowler, 1904^{c g}
- Haplaxius fulvus (Osborn, 1903)^{c g b}
- Haplaxius gabrielensis Flock, 1951^{c g}
- Haplaxius glyphis (Kramer, 1979)^{c g}
- Haplaxius gnophos (Kramer, 1979)^{c g}
- Haplaxius gomphos (Kramer, 1979)^{c g}
- Haplaxius hochae O'Brien, 2006^{c g}
- Haplaxius impiger (Ball, 1902)^{c g}
- Haplaxius jamaicae (Kramer, 1979)^{c g}
- Haplaxius laevis Fowler, 1904^{c g}
- Haplaxius lophion (Kramer, 1979)^{c g}
- Haplaxius lunatus (Van Duzee, 1909)^{c g}
- Haplaxius lyssa (Kramer, 1979)^{c g}
- Haplaxius meadi (Kramer, 1979)^{c g}
- Haplaxius mojavensis (Ball, 1933)^{c g}
- Haplaxius mokos (Kramer, 1979)^{c g}
- Haplaxius neopusillus (Kramer, 1979)^{c g}
- Haplaxius nevadensis (Kramer, 1979)^{c g}
- Haplaxius nigrifrons (Ball, 1937)^{c g}
- Haplaxius nimbus (Kramer, 1979)^{c g}
- Haplaxius nolinus (Ball, 1933)^{c g}
- Haplaxius occidentalis (Van Duzee, 1914)^{c g}
- Haplaxius ovatus (Ball, 1933)^{c g b}
- Haplaxius phylax (Kramer, 1979)^{c g}
- Haplaxius pictifrons (Stål, 1862)^{c g b}
- Haplaxius pusillus (Van Duzee, 1909)^{c g b}
- Haplaxius radicis (Osborn, 1903)^{c g b}
- Haplaxius rubidus (Ball, 1933)^{c g}
- Haplaxius sillos (Kramer, 1979)^{c g}
- Haplaxius skarphion (Kramer, 1979)^{c g}
- Haplaxius slossonae (Ball, 1902)^{c g}
- Haplaxius spanglerorum (Kramer, 1979)^{c g}
- Haplaxius sparagma (Kramer, 1979)^{c g}
- Haplaxius synavei (Kramer, 1979)^{c g}
- Haplaxius tekmar (Kramer, 1979)^{c g}
- Haplaxius tekton (Kramer, 1979)^{c g}
- Haplaxius texensis (Kramer, 1979)^{c g}
- Haplaxius thryligma (Kramer, 1979)^{c g}
- Haplaxius truncatus (Metcalf, 1923)^{c g b}
- Haplaxius vilbastei (Kramer, 1979)^{c g}
- Haplaxius viridicatus (Ball, 1933)^{c g}
- Haplaxius viridis (Ball, 1902)^{c g}
- Haplaxius wheeleri (Wilson, 1996)^{c g}
- Haplaxius xyron^{c b}
- Haplaxius yuccandus (Ball, 1933)^{c g}

Data sources: i = ITIS, c = Catalogue of Life, g = GBIF, b = Bugguide.net
