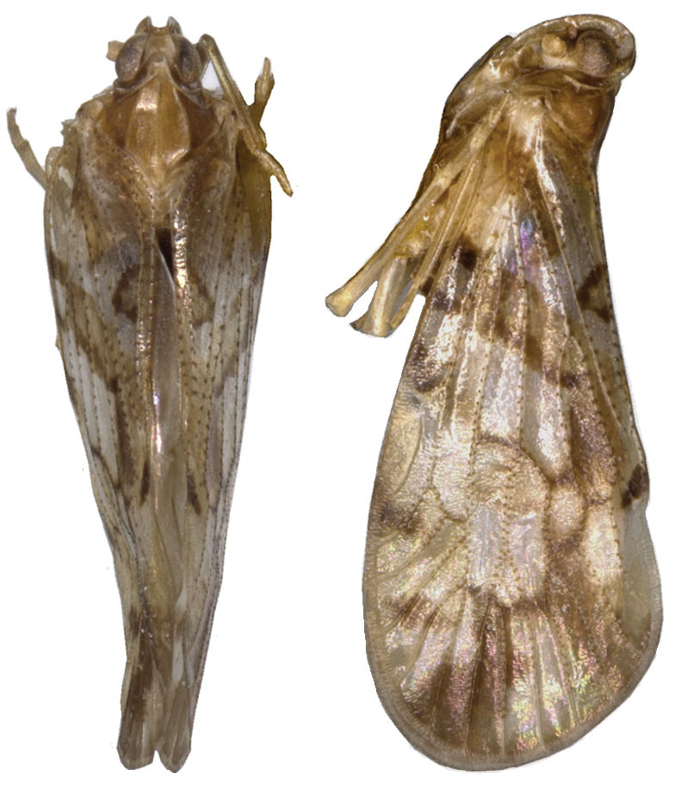

Scientific classification
- Kingdom: Animalia
- Phylum: Arthropoda
- Clade: Pancrustacea
- Class: Insecta
- Order: Hemiptera
- Suborder: Auchenorrhyncha
- Infraorder: Fulgoromorpha
- Family: Cixiidae
- Genus: Andixius
- Species: A. longispinus

Binomial name
- Andixius longispinus Zhi & Chen, 2018 in Zhi et al., 2018

= Andixius longispinus =

Species of true bug

Andixius longispinus is a species of planthopper belonging to the family Cixiidae. It is endemic to Yunnan, China.

Body length of male is 6.2–6.5mm and that of female is about 7.2 mm. Body and antennae are yellowish brown. Eyes are brown with faint yellow ocelli. Forewings are semi-translucent. One long process arises from the base of the flagellum. There is a tan spot near claval fork on the forewing.
