= Solonaima =

Scientific classification
- Domain: Eukaryota
- Kingdom: Animalia
- Phylum: Arthropoda
- Class: Insecta
- Order: Hemiptera
- Suborder: Auchenorrhyncha
- Infraorder: Fulgoromorpha
- Family: Cixiidae
- Genus: Solonaima; Kirkaldy, 1906

Genus of true bugs

Solonaima is a genus of leafhoppers in the family, Cixiidae, first described by George Willis Kirkaldy in 1906. The type species is Solonaima solonaima.

The Australian species are found in New South Wales and Queensland.

== Species ==
- Solonaima baylissa Hoch & Howarth, 1989^{a b}
- Solonaima bifurca Hoch, 1988^{a b}
- Solonaima cedrivula Hoch, 1988^{a b}
- Solonaima halos Hoch & Howarth, 1989^{a b}
- Solonaima irvini Hoch & Howarth, 1989^{a b}
- Solonaima minuta Hoch, 1988^{a b}
- Solonaima monteithia Erbe & Hoch, 2004^{a b}
- Solonaima nielseni Erbe & Hoch, 2004^{a b}
- Solonaima ornata Hoch, 1988^{a b}
- Solonaima pallescens (Distant, 1907)^{a b}
- Solonaima pholetor Hoch & Howarth, 1989^{a}
- Solonaima riocampa Hoch, 1988^{a b}
- Solonaima solonaima Kirkaldy, 1906^{a b}
- Solonaima stonei Hoch & Howarth, 1989^{a b}
- Solonaima sullivani Hoch & Howarth, 1989^{a b}

Data sources: a = GBIF, b = IRMNG
