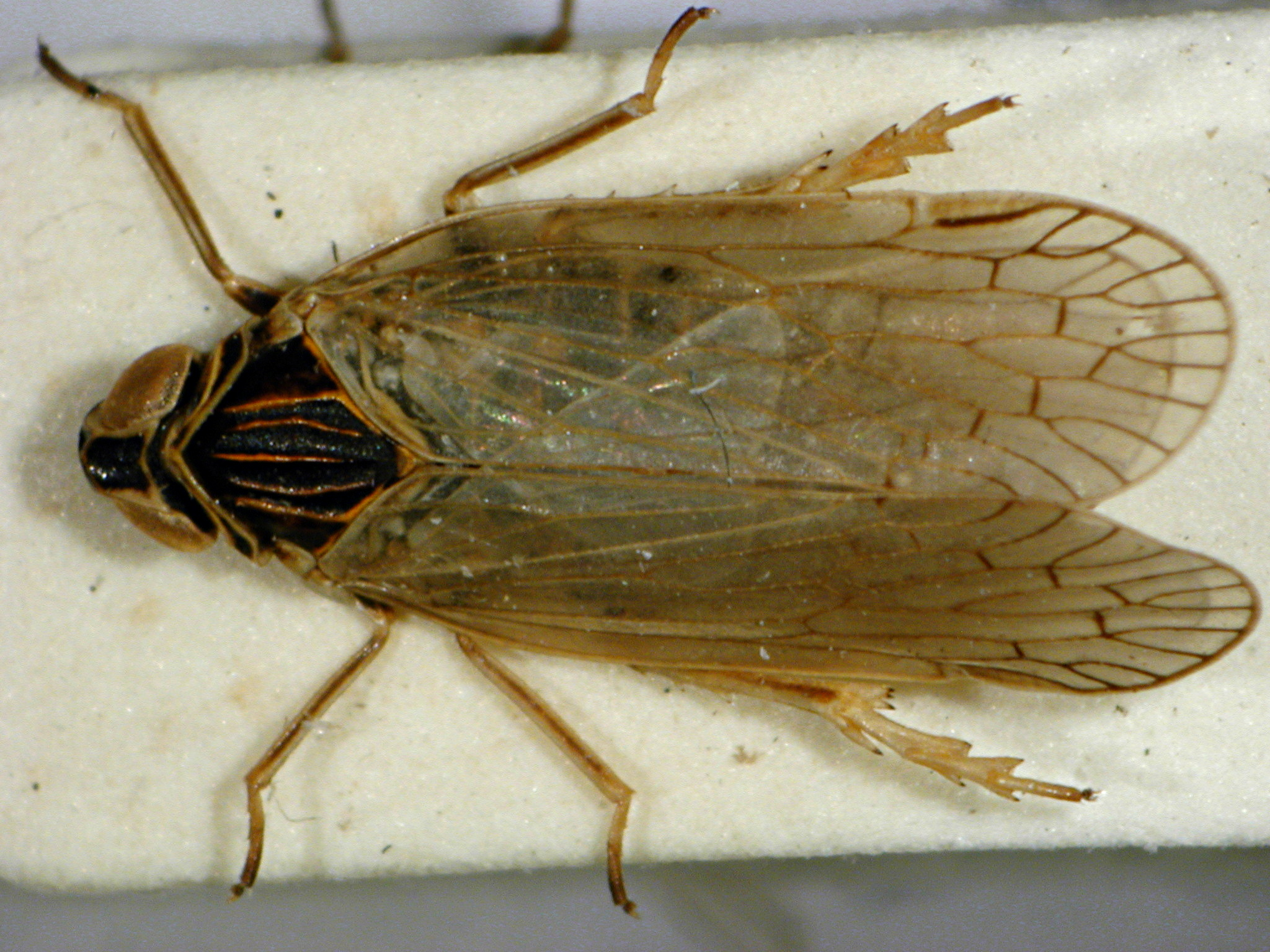
- Pentastiridius

Scientific classification
- Domain: Eukaryota
- Kingdom: Animalia
- Phylum: Arthropoda
- Class: Insecta
- Order: Hemiptera
- Suborder: Auchenorrhyncha
- Infraorder: Fulgoromorpha
- Family: Cixiidae
- Genus: Pentastiridius; Kirschbaum, 1868

= Pentastiridius =

Genus of true bugs

Pentastiridius is a genus of true bugs belonging to the family Cixiidae.

The genus has almost cosmopolitan distribution.

Species:

- Pentastiridius apicalis (Uhler, 1896)
- Pentastiridius badiensis Van Stalle, 1986
