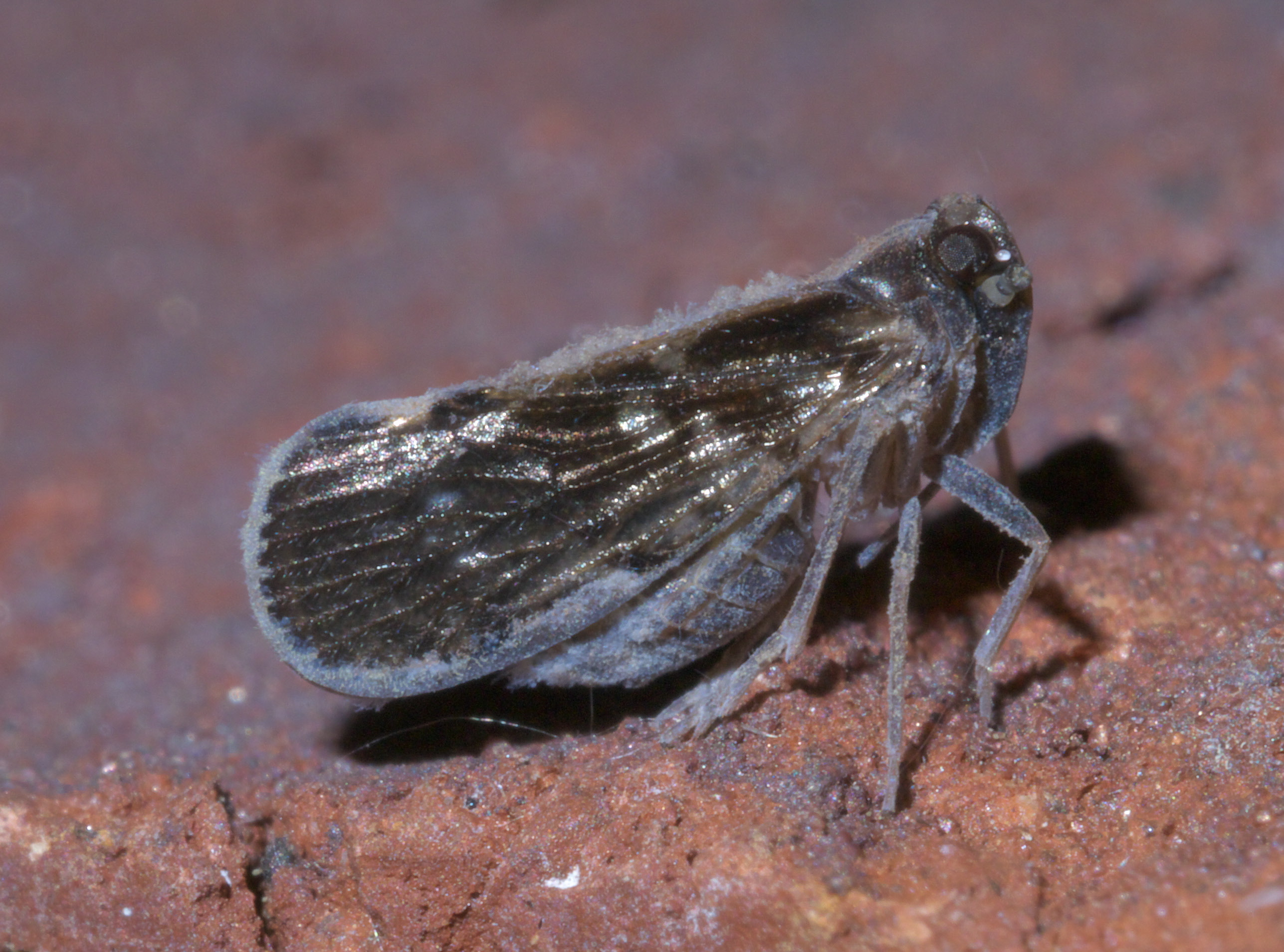

Scientific classification
- Domain: Eukaryota
- Kingdom: Animalia
- Phylum: Arthropoda
- Class: Insecta
- Order: Hemiptera
- Suborder: Auchenorrhyncha
- Infraorder: Fulgoromorpha
- Family: Cixiidae
- Subfamily: Cixiinae
- Genus: Pintalia; Stal, 1862

= Pintalia =

Genus of true bugs

Pintalia is a genus of cixiid planthoppers in the family Cixiidae. There are at least 50 described species in Pintalia.

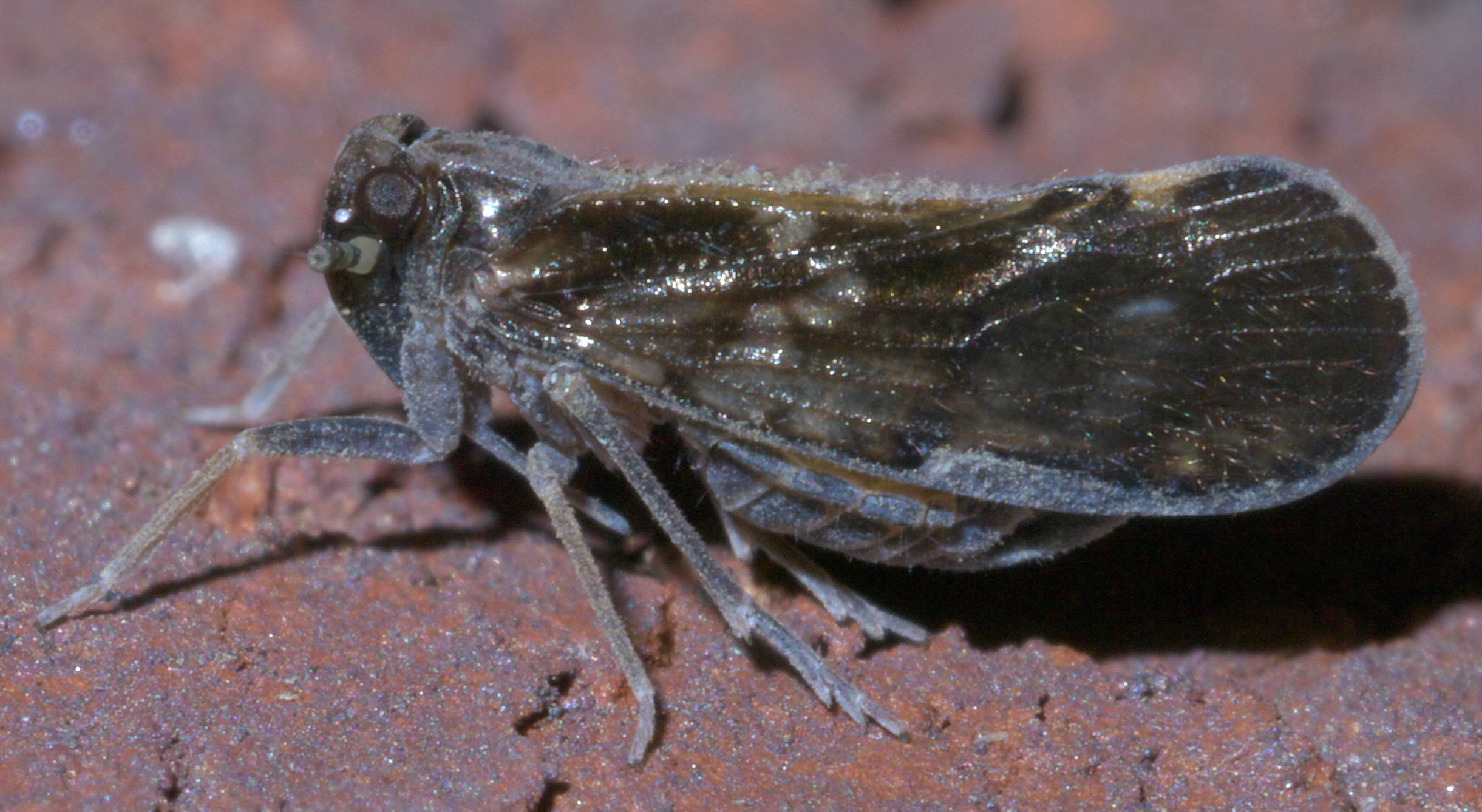

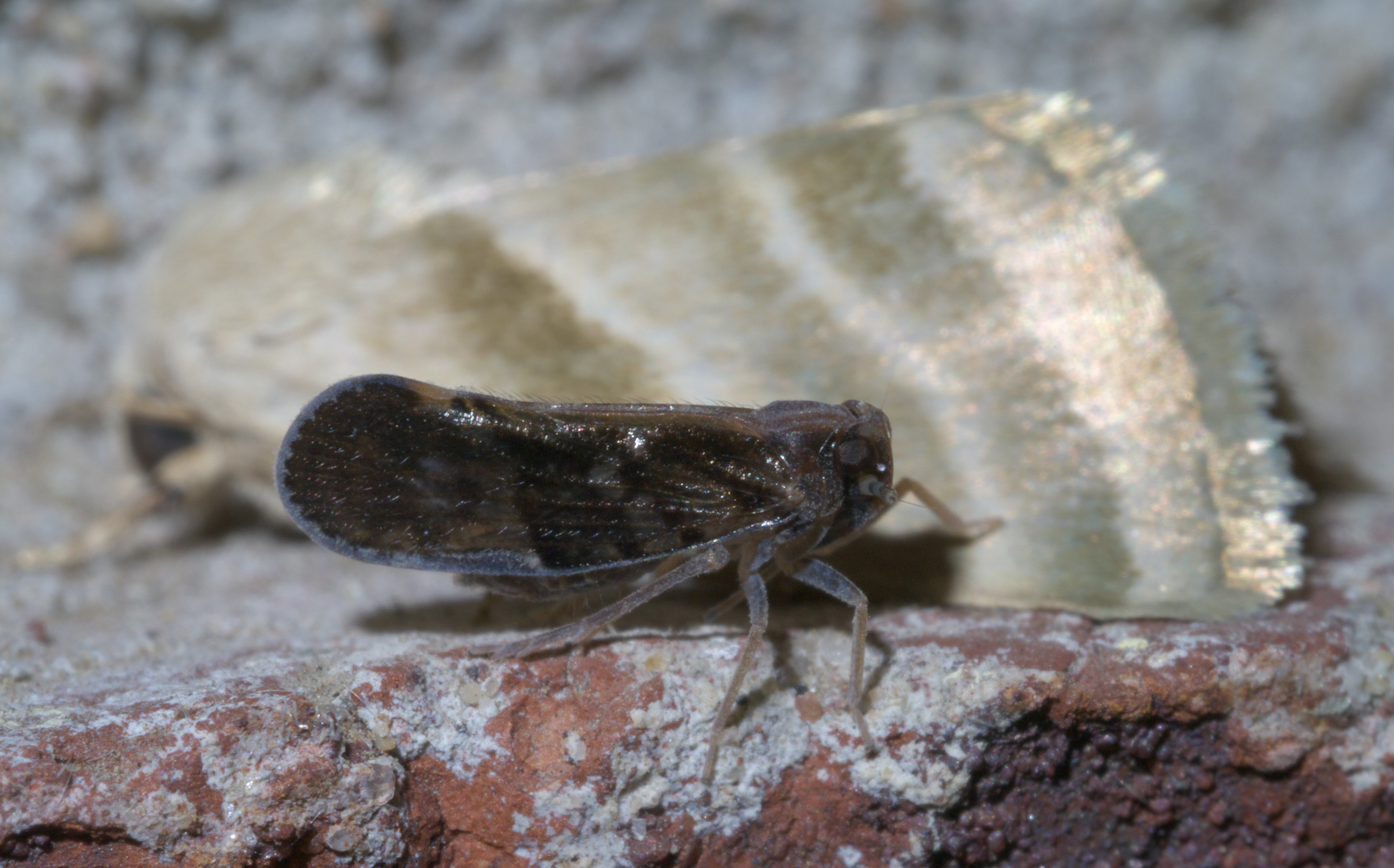

== Species ==
These 55 species belong to the genus Pintalia:

- Pintalia acarinata Caldwell, 1944^{c g}
- Pintalia albolineata Muir, 1934^{c g}
- Pintalia alta Osborn, 1935^{c g}
- Pintalia aspersa (Fowler, 1904)^{c g}
- Pintalia castanea Metcalf, 1946^{c g}
- Pintalia chromata Caldwell, 1944^{c g}
- Pintalia consobrina Stal, 1862^{c g}
- Pintalia contra Caldwell, 1944^{c g}
- Pintalia curvivitta Fennah, 1945^{c g}
- Pintalia daedala Fennah, 1945^{c g}
- Pintalia damalis Fennah, 1971^{c g}
- Pintalia decorata (Uhler, 1895)^{c g}
- Pintalia delicata (Fowler, 1904)^{c g b}
- Pintalia discoidalis Lethierry, 1890^{c g}
- Pintalia dominicana Fennah, 1948^{c g}
- Pintalia erecta Metcalf, 1938^{c g}
- Pintalia falcata Fennah, 1945^{c g}
- Pintalia fasciatipennis Stal, 1862^{c g}
- Pintalia fasciolaris (Blanchard, 1852)^{c g}
- Pintalia fraterna Stal, 1862^{c g}
- Pintalia fumata Caldwell, 1944^{c g}
- Pintalia geometra Caldwell, 1944^{c g}
- Pintalia germana (Fowler, 1904)^{c g}
- Pintalia grenadana Fennah, 1948^{c g}
- Pintalia gurneyi Kramer, 1983^{c g}
- Pintalia inornata Stal, 1862^{c g}
- Pintalia insularis Osborn, 1935^{c g}
- Pintalia lateralis Stal, 1862^{c g}
- Pintalia lineata Caldwell, 1944^{c g}
- Pintalia maculata (Fowler, 1904)^{c g}
- Pintalia marginata Caldwell, 1944^{c g}
- Pintalia marmorata Fennah, 1945^{c g}
- Pintalia martorelli Caldwell, 1951^{c g}
- Pintalia metcalfi O'Brien, 1987^{c g}
- Pintalia mettacta O'Brien, 1987^{c g}
- Pintalia nemaculata Caldwell, 1951^{c g}
- Pintalia neoaspersa Caldwell, 1944^{c g}
- Pintalia obliquivitta Fennah, 1945^{c g}
- Pintalia obscuripennis Stal, 1862^{c g}
- Pintalia osborni Caldwell, 1944^{c g}
- Pintalia pictipennis Stal, 1862^{c g}
- Pintalia procellata (Uhler, 1901)^{c g}
- Pintalia proxima Stal, 1862^{c g}
- Pintalia pseudomaculata Caldwell, 1944^{c g}
- Pintalia punctata Caldwell, 1944^{c g}
- Pintalia quadrimaculata Fennah, 1945^{c g}
- Pintalia sanctae-luciae Fennah, 1948^{c g}
- Pintalia stigmata Caldwell, 1944^{c g}
- Pintalia straminea Fennah, 1945^{c g}
- Pintalia supralta Caldwell, 1951^{c g}
- Pintalia tacta (Fowler, 1904)^{c g}
- Pintalia ustulata Stal, 1862^{c g}
- Pintalia variegata (Fabricius, 1803)^{c g}
- Pintalia vibex Kramer, 1983^{c g b}
- Pintalia vomerifera Fennah, 1945^{c g}

Data sources: i = ITIS, c = Catalogue of Life, g = GBIF, b = Bugguide.net
