= Haplaxius crudus =

Scientific classification
- Domain: Eukaryota
- Kingdom: Animalia
- Phylum: Arthropoda
- Class: Insecta
- Order: Hemiptera
- Suborder: Auchenorrhyncha
- Infraorder: Fulgoromorpha
- Family: Cixiidae
- Genus: Haplaxius
- Species: H. crudus

Binomial name
- Haplaxius crudus Van Duzee, 1907

Synonyms
- Haplaxius cocois (Fennah, 1945); Myndus crudus Van Duzee, 1907; Paramyndus cocois Fennah, 1945

Species of true bug

Haplaxius crudus is a planthopper species in the genus Haplaxius.

H. crudus is the vector of the coconut lethal yellowing/16SrIV-A.

== Range ==
Throughout the Caribbean and in Florida.

== Hosts ==
The nymphs are found on over 40 species of Poaceae and Cyperaceae in the Neotropical. In urban Florida habitats they prefer St. Augustine grass. Adults feed exclusively on the foliage of 30 species of Arecaceae. Adults seem to prefer Cocos nucifera but that may be due to observations being made around plantations, where surrounding grass provides a good combination of habitats for both nymphs and adults. Have been known since at least 1978 as the most common insect on C. nucifera in Florida and Jamaica.

== As a vector ==
Vector of lethal yellowing/16SrIV-A phytoplasma.

== Economic impact ==
Has transmitted the LY responsible for the deaths of millions of ornamental and farmed palms throughout the Caribbean. Note that in the absence of a phytoplasma to vector, does not damage host palms.

== Management ==
Replacement of nymph host populations in nurseries with anything non-monocot, diazinon application on nymph hosts, and systemic dimethoate injection of the adult hosts.
