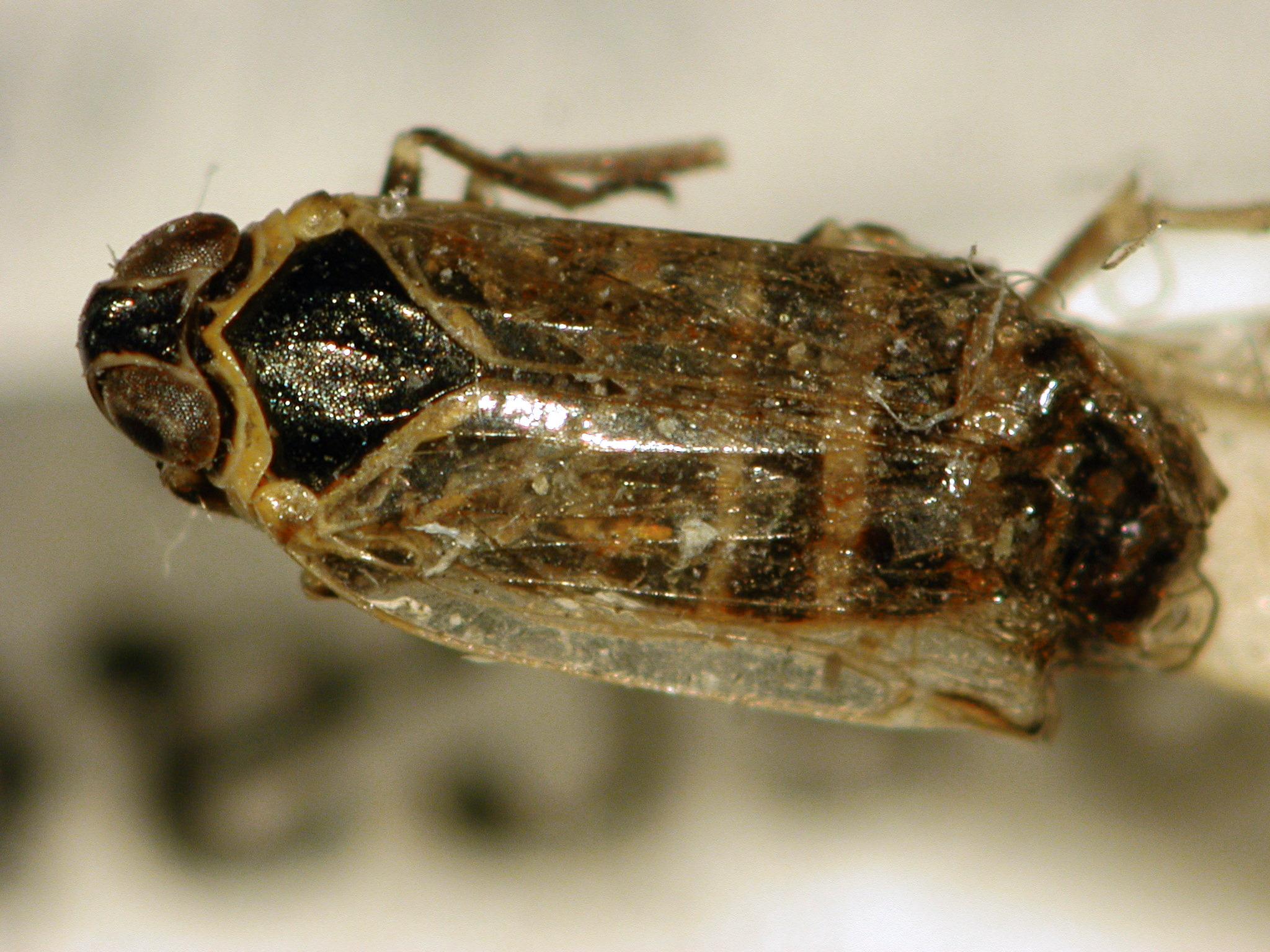

Scientific classification
- Domain: Eukaryota
- Kingdom: Animalia
- Phylum: Arthropoda
- Class: Insecta
- Order: Hemiptera
- Suborder: Auchenorrhyncha
- Infraorder: Fulgoromorpha
- Family: Cixiidae
- Genus: Hyalesthes
- Species: H. obsoleta

Binomial name
- Hyalesthes obsoleta Signoret 1865

= Hyalesthes obsoleta =

Species of planthopper

Hyalesthes obsoleta is a planthopper species in the genus Hyalesthes.

H. obsoleta is the vector of the black wood disease of grapevine.
