= Leades =

Scientific classification
- Kingdom: Animalia
- Phylum: Arthropoda
- Clade: Pancrustacea
- Class: Insecta
- Order: Hemiptera
- Suborder: Auchenorrhyncha
- Infraorder: Fulgoromorpha
- Family: Cixiidae
- Subfamily: Cixiinae
- Tribe: Cixiini
- Genus: Leades; Jacobi, 1928

Species
- See text

Genus of true bugs

Leades is a genus of planthoppers in the tribe Cixiini. Species in this genus have been observed across Australia.

In 2025, Luo et al. published a paper in Systematic Entomology, proposing that Leades—along with two other genera endemic to Australia (Chidaea and Tyligma)—be grouped in a new tribe named Chidaeini.

== Species ==
There are at least six described species in the genus Leades:

- Leades centralis Löcker, 2020
- Leades clypealis (Muir, 1931)
- Leades ginginensis Löcker, 2020
- Leades grandis Löcker, 2020
- Leades rufinis Jacobi, 1928
- Leades warro Löcker, 2020
