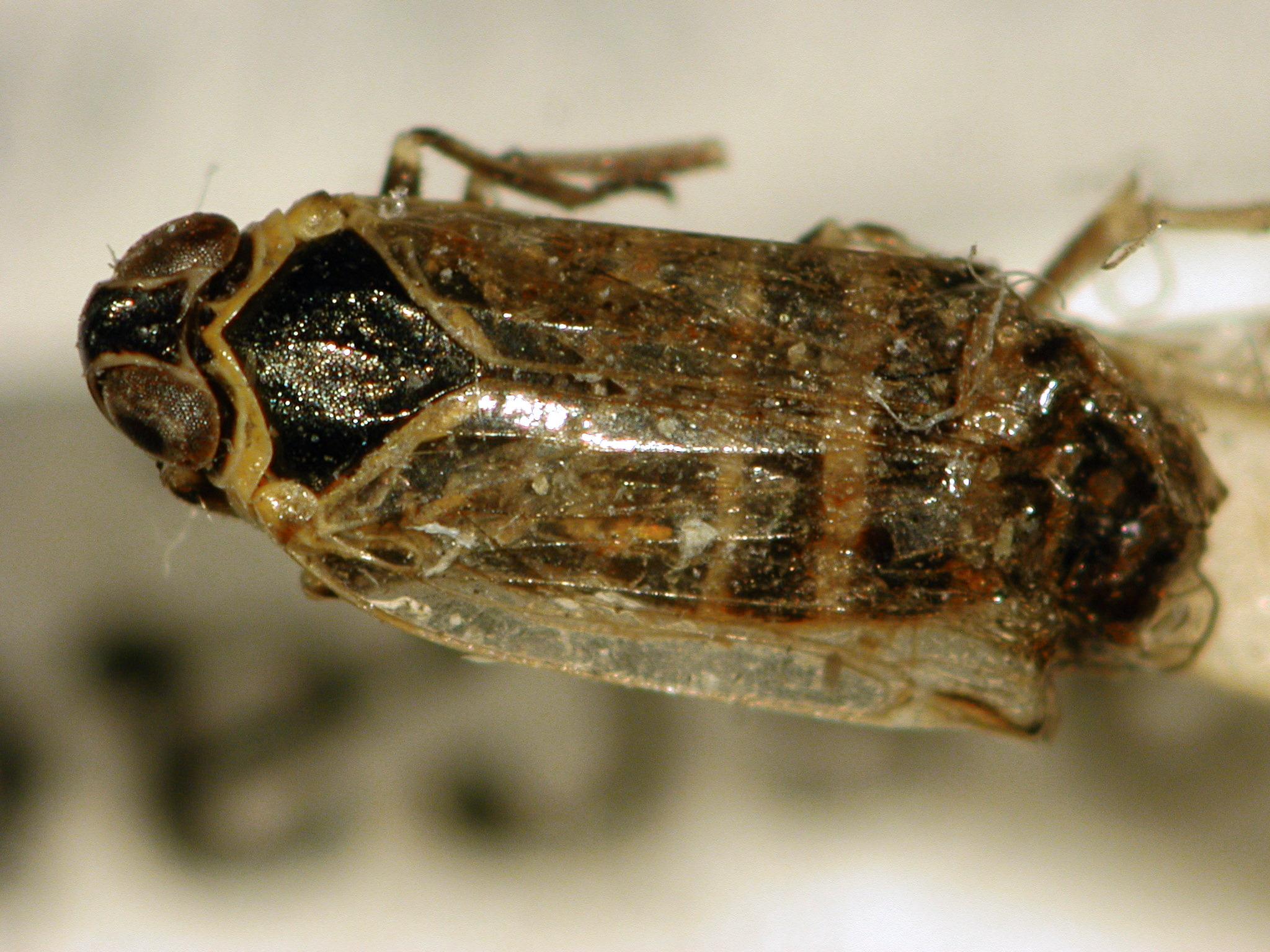
- Hyalesthes obsoleta

Scientific classification
- Domain: Eukaryota
- Kingdom: Animalia
- Phylum: Arthropoda
- Class: Insecta
- Order: Hemiptera
- Suborder: Auchenorrhyncha
- Infraorder: Fulgoromorpha
- Family: Cixiidae
- Genus: Hyalesthes; Signoret 1865

Species
- See text

Synonyms
- Hyalestes Signoret, 1865 (Missp.); Hyalesths Signoret, 1865 (Missp.); Hyolestes Signoret, 1865 (Missp.); Liorhinus Kirschbaum, 1868; Pseudyalesthes Kusnezov, 1935

= Hyalesthes =

Genus of planthoppers

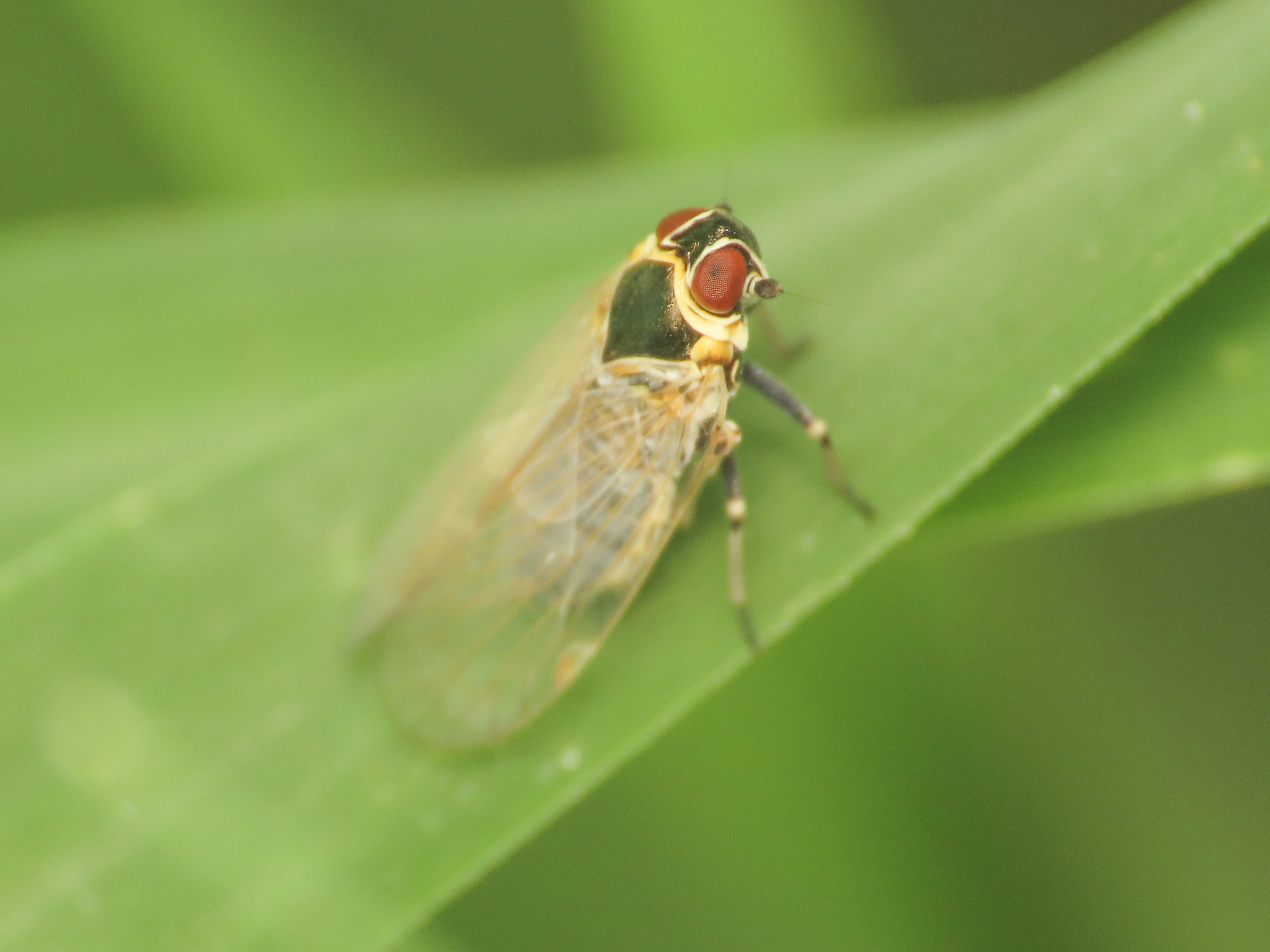
Hyalesthes obsoletus, Italy

Hyalesthes is a planthopper genus in the family Cixiidae.

== Nomenclature ==
The etymology is from Greek: ὕαλος (glassy, hyaline) + ἑσθὴς (cloth, toga, robe). While Signoret originally treated the genus as masculine, as did many subsequent authors, according to the ICZN Art. 30.1.2, the name is feminine.

== Species ==
- Hyalesthes angustula Horváth, 1909
- Hyalesthes askalensis Hoch, 1986
- Hyalesthes aylana Hoch, 1986
- Hyalesthes carinifrons (Kusnezov, 1935)
- Hyalesthes diyala Remane & Hoch, 1985
- Hyalesthes duffelsi Dlabola, 1974
- Hyalesthes flavipennis Horváth, 1909
- Hyalesthes flavovaria Kusnezov, 1935
- Hyalesthes hani Hoch, 1986
- Hyalesthes kurbangaevi Dubovsky & Turgunov, 1972
- Hyalesthes lacotei (Dlabola, 1970)
- Hyalesthes luteipes Fieber, 1876
- Hyalesthes madeires Hoch, 1985
- Hyalesthes mavromoustkisi Dlabola, 1959
- Hyalesthes mlokosiewiczi Signoret, 1879
- Hyalesthes obsoleta Signoret, 1865
- Hyalesthes orsoles Remane & Hoch, 1985
- Hyalesthes philesakis Hoch, 1986
- Hyalesthes ponticorum Hoch, 1986
- Hyalesthes portonoves Remane & Hoch, 1985
- Hyalesthes producta Lethierry, 1889
- Hyalesthes restulta Dlabola, 1994
- Hyalesthes sagittus Gnezdilov, 2024
- Hyalesthes scotti Ferrari, 1882
- Hyalesthes stylidentata (Dlabola, 1979)
- Hyalesthes teno Remane & Hoch, 1985
- Hyalesthes thracica Hoch, 1986
- Hyalesthes tilos Remane & Hoch, 1985
- Hyalesthes verticillata Dlabola, 1994
- Hyalesthes veyseli Hoch, 1986
- Hyalesthes yozgatica Hoch, 1986
- Hyalesthes zabolica Dlabola, 1985
