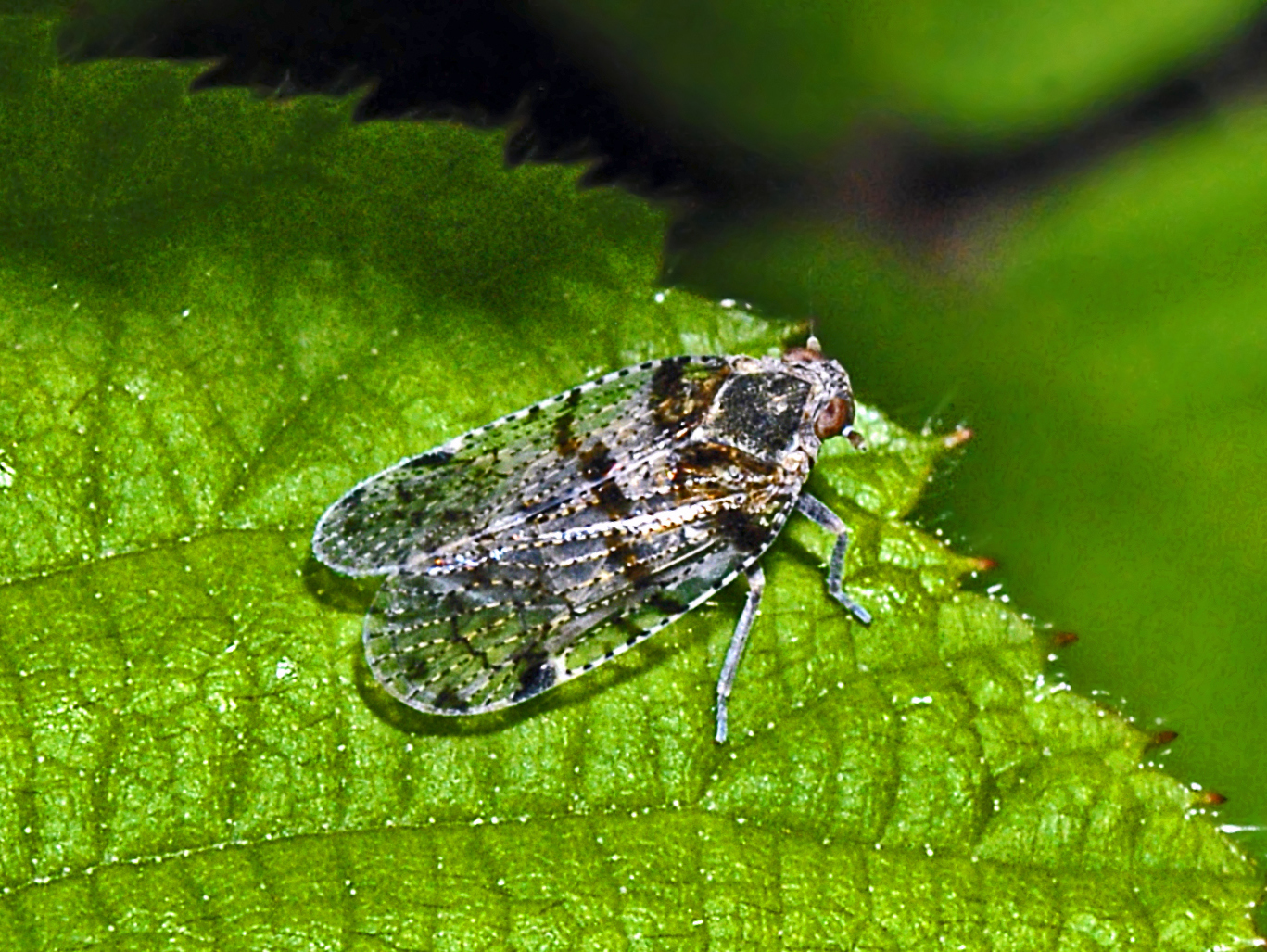
- Cixius cf. C. nervosus

Scientific classification
- Kingdom: Animalia
- Phylum: Arthropoda
- Class: Insecta
- Order: Hemiptera
- Suborder: Auchenorrhyncha
- Infraorder: Fulgoromorpha
- Family: Cixiidae
- Subfamily: Cixiinae
- Tribe: Cixiini; Muir, 1923

Genera
- See text

= Cixiini =

Tribe of true bugs

Cixiini is a planthopper tribe in the family Cixiidae. This tribe is non-monophyletic.

== Genera ==
- Achaemenes Stål, 1866
- Aka White, 1879
- Anila Distant, 1906
- Ankistru s Tsaur & Hsu, 1991
- Apartus Holzinger, 2002
- Aselgeoides Distant, 1917
- Asotocixius Kramer, 1983
- Calamister Kirkaldy, 1906
- Cermada Emeljanov, 2000
- Chathamaka Lariviere, 1999
- Chidaea Emeljanov, 2000
- Cixiosoma Berg, 1879
- Cixius Latreille, 1804
- Discophorellus Tsaur & Hsu, 1991
- Flachaemus Van Stålle, 1986
- Gonophallus Tsaur & Hsu, 1991
- Iolania Kirkaldy, 1902
- Koroana Myers, 1924
- Leades Jacobi, 1928
- Leptolamia Metcalf, 1936
- Macrocixius Matsumura, 1914
- Malpha Myers, 1924
- Microledrida Fowler, 1904
- Monomalpha Emeljanov, 2000
- Nanocixius Wagner, 1939
- Neocixius Wagner, 1939
- Pachyntheisa Fowler, 1904
- Platycixius Van Duzee, 1914
- Sardocixius Holzinger, 2002
- Semicixius Tsaur & Hsu, 1991
- Simplicixius Holzinger, 2002
- Sphaerocixius Wagner, 1939
- Stegocixius Kramer, 1983
- Tachycixius Wagner, 1939
- Trirhacus Fieber, 1875
