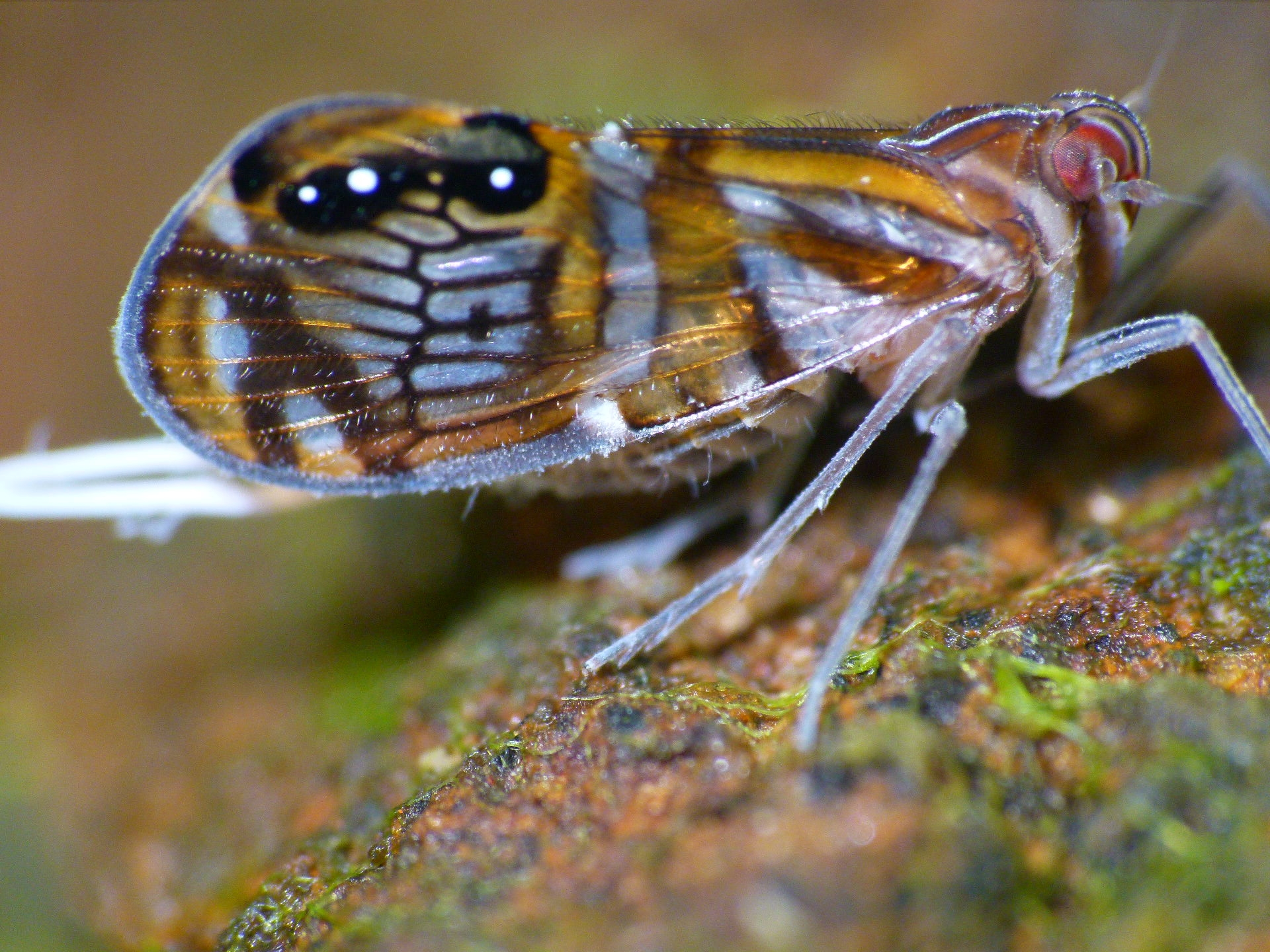
- Brixia albomaculata

Scientific classification
- Kingdom: Animalia
- Phylum: Arthropoda
- Clade: Pancrustacea
- Class: Insecta
- Order: Hemiptera
- Suborder: Auchenorrhyncha
- Infraorder: Fulgoromorpha
- Family: Cixiidae
- Genus: Brixia; Stål, 1856

Species
- See text

= Brixia (planthopper) =

Genus of true bugs

Brixia is a genus of cixiid planthopper that includes about 120 species. Most species are found in the Oriental region, and a few in the Afrotropical realm.

== Species ==
- Brixia afrotropicalis Van Stalle, 1984
- Brixia albomaculata Distant, 1906
- Brixia albotincta Synave, 1965
- Brixia andranotobakensis Synave, 1965
- Brixia andriae Synave, 1965
- Brixia anosibeana Synave, 1956
- Brixia antsalovensis Synave, 1965
- Brixia antsingensis Synave, 1965
- Brixia apicemaculata Synave, 1956
- Brixia atratula Walker, 1870
- Brixia aureotincta Synave, 1956
- Brixia belanitrensis Synave, 1965
- Brixia bella Van Stalle, 1984
- Brixia belouvensis Synave, 1960
- Brixia bemanavyensis Synave, 1965
- Brixia bimaculata Synave, 1965
- Brixia bipunctata Van Stalle, 1984
- Brixia bohemani (Stål, 1854)
- Brixia briali Hoch & Bonfils, 2003
- Brixia broussei Williams, 1975
- Brixia calabarensis Synave, 1957
- Brixia chicapensis Synave, 1961
- Brixia congrua Walker, 1870
- Brixia coronata Van Stalle, 1983
- Brixia costalis Synave, 1959
- Brixia decepta Williams, 1983
- Brixia dedegwana Synave, 1960
- Brixia denticulata Williams, 1975
- Brixia discolor Williams, 1975
- Brixia divisa Walker, 1858
- Brixia dundoensis Synave, 1961
- Brixia electa Synave, 1971
- Brixia fasciata (Signoret, 1860)
- Brixia flavida Williams, 1975
- Brixia flavomaculata Distant, 1906
- Brixia formosana Matsumura, 1914
- Brixia fumata Van Stalle, 1983
- Brixia fuscata Williams, 1983
- Brixia fuscomarginata Williams, 1975
- Brixia griveaudi Synave, 1956
- Brixia harimaensis Matsumura, 1914
- Brixia hildebrandti Jacobi, 1917
- Brixia hyalinipennis Synave, 1965
- Brixia inornata Distant, 1911
- Brixia insignis (Distant, 1917)
- Brixia insularis Synave, 1959
- Brixia ivelonensis Synave, 1965
- Brixia kalalavensis Synave, 1965
- Brixia krameri Synave, 1979
- Brixia lalouettei Williams, 1975
- Brixia lamelliceps Fennah, 1958
- Brixia lineata Synave, 1956
- Brixia longispinosa Van Stalle, 1984
- Brixia lunulata (Amyot & Serville, 1843)
- Brixia macabeensis Synave, 1960
- Brixia maculata Synave, 1965
- Brixia mahensis Distant, 1917
- Brixia mameti Synave, 1958
- Brixia marojelyensis Synave, 1965
- Brixia mauritiensis Williams, 1975
- Brixia mauritii Synave, 1960
- Brixia meeli Synave, 1933
- Brixia membranifera Van Stalle, 1987
- Brixia minor Van Stalle, 1984
- Brixia modesta Van Stalle, 1983
- Brixia montana Synave, 1965
- Brixia moramangensis Synave, 1965
- Brixia munita (Walker, 1857)
- Brixia nanula Walker, 1870
- Brixia natalicola (Stål, 1855)
- Brixia neglecta Van Stalle, 1983
- Brixia nigeriana Synave, 1971
- Brixia nigrifrons Synave, 1960
- Brixia nigripennis Williams, 1975
- Brixia nosybeana Synave, 1965
- Brixia ocellata Matsumura, 1914
- Brixia opulenta Synave, 1956
- Brixia pallens Van Stalle, 1983
- Brixia parvula Synave, 1956
- Brixia pauliani Synave, 1956
- Brixia perate Van Stalle, 1984
- Brixia perruchensis Synave, 1960
- Brixia personata Van Stalle, 1983
- Brixia pilosa Williams, 1975
- Brixia propinqua Van Stalle, 1983
- Brixia pulchra Synave, 1965
- Brixia pulla Muir, 1925
- Brixia pullomaculata Lallemand & Synave, 1954
- Brixia ranomafanensis Synave, 1965
- Brixia robinsoni Synave, 1965
- Brixia rodriguezi Muir, 1925
- Brixia rosae Synave, 1965
- Brixia saegeri Synave, 1960
- Brixia sambavensis Synave, 1965
- Brixia sanctae-mariae Synave, 1965
- Brixia sandrangatensis Synave, 1956
- Brixia semistriata Van Stalle, 1983
- Brixia speciosa Muir, 1923
- Brixia stannusi Muir, 1923
- Brixia stellata Distant, 1917
- Brixia striatipes Van Stalle, 1986
- Brixia strigosa Van Stalle, 1983
- Brixia sundara Williams, 1975
- Brixia sylvicola Synave, 1956
- Brixia terminalis Walker, 1870
- Brixia tincta Synave, 1956
- Brixia tortriciformis Kirby, 1891
- Brixia tricolor Synave, 1961
- Brixia trifasciata Synave, 1956
- Brixia unipunctata Synave, 1965
- Brixia unistriata Synave, 1961
- Brixia uvidensis Williams, 1975
- Brixia variolata Williams, 1975
- Brixia vaughani Williams, 1975
- Brixia venulosa Williams, 1975
- Brixia venusta Tsaur & Hsu, 1991
- Brixia virgulata Williams, 1975
- Brixia viridis Muir, 1925
- Brixia wagneri Synave, 1958
- Brixia williamsi Synave, 1958
