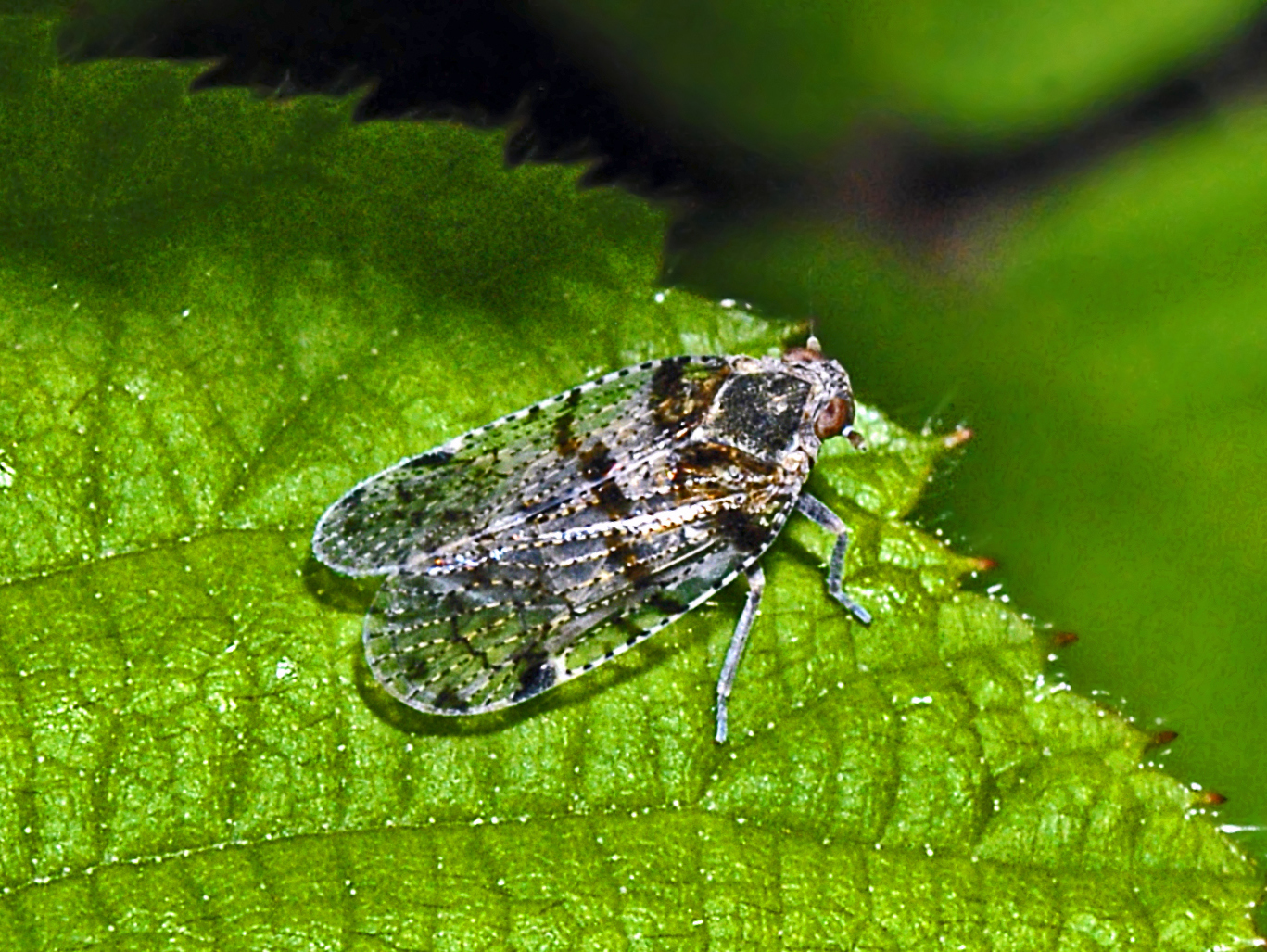
- Cixius nervosus

Scientific classification
- Kingdom: Animalia
- Phylum: Arthropoda
- Class: Insecta
- Order: Hemiptera
- Suborder: Auchenorrhyncha
- Infraorder: Fulgoromorpha
- Family: Cixiidae
- Tribe: Cixiini
- Genus: Cixius; Latreille, 1804

Species
- See text

= Cixius =

Genus of true bugs

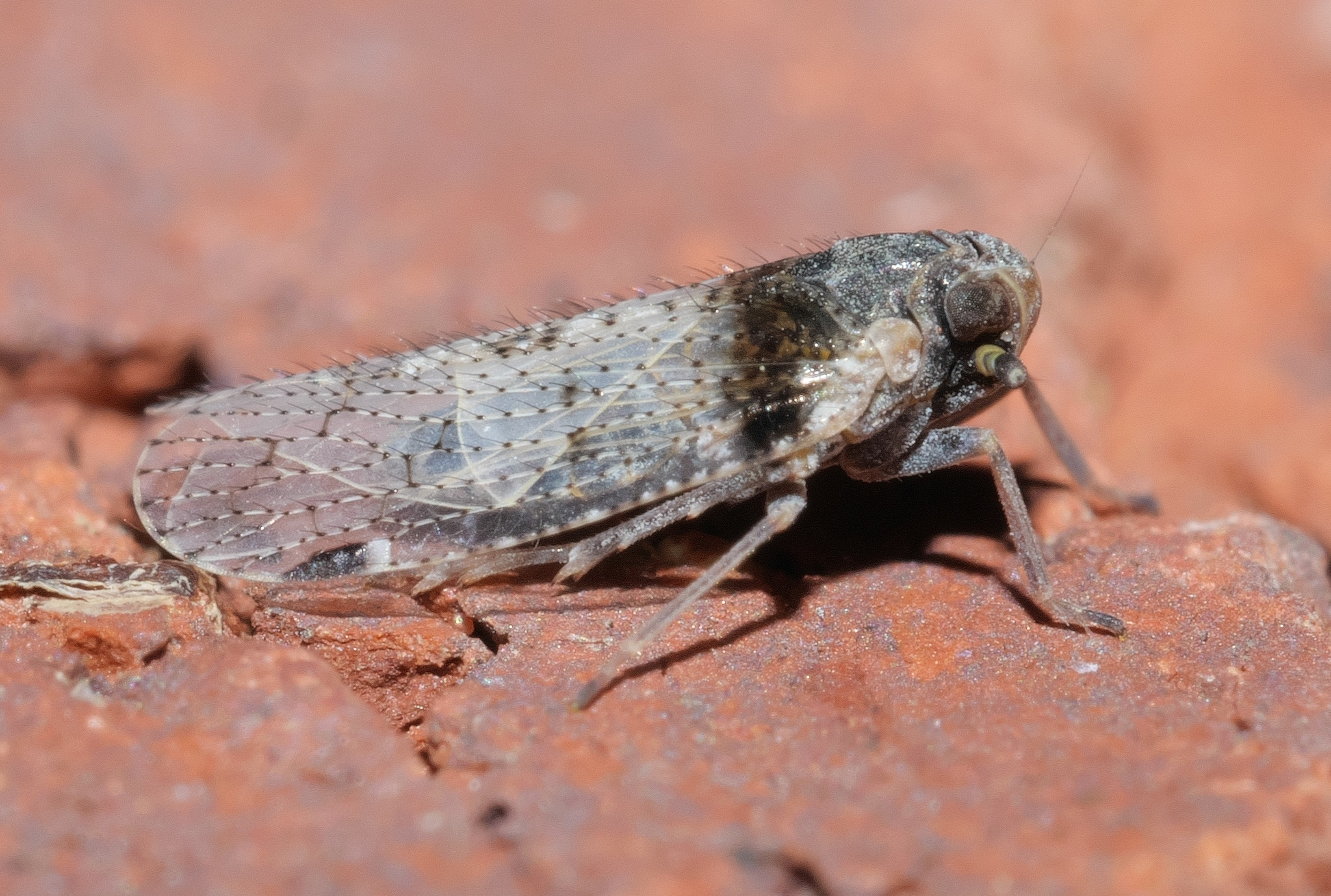
Cixius stigmatus, Oklahoma

Cixius is planthopper genus in the tribe Cixiini.

== Species ==
- Cixius alpestris Wagner, 1939
- Cixius ariadne Hoch & Asche, 1993
- Cixius armatus Ribaut, 1953
- Cixius azofloresi Remane & Asche, 1979
- Cixius azomariae Remane & Asche, 1979
- Cixius azopicavus Hoch, 1991
- Cixius azopifajo Remane & Asche, 1979
- Cixius azoricus Lindberg, 1954
- Cixius azoterceirae Remane & Asche, 1979
- Cixius beieri Wagner, 1939
- Cixius caledonicus China, 1942
- Cixius cambricus China, 1935
- Cixius carniolicus Wagner, 1939
- Cixius cavazoricus Hoch, 1991
- Cixius chaoensis China, 1938
- Cixius crambiformis Germar, 1830
- Cixius cunicularius (Linnaeus, 1767)
- Cixius distinguendus Kirschbaum, 1868
- Cixius dubius Wagner, 1939
- Cixius granulatus Horváth, 1897
- Cixius heydenii Kirschbaum, 1868
- Cixius hispidus Logvinenko, 1967
- Cixius insularis Lindberg, 1954
- Cixius lineolatus Ribaut, 1960
- Cixius madeirensis China, 1938
- Cixius nervosus (Linnaeus, 1758)
- Cixius nycticolus Hoch & Asche, 1993
- Cixius ochraceus Ribaut, 1953
- Cixius pallipes Fieber, 1876
- Cixius palmensis Lindberg, 1960
- Cixius palmeros Hoch & Asche, 1993
- Cixius pascuorum Ribaut, 1953
- Cixius pinarcoladus Hoch & Asche, 1993
- Cixius ratonicus Hoch & Asche, 1993
- Cixius remotus Edwards, 1888
- Cixius rufofasciatus Logvinenko, 1974
- Cixius rufus Logvinenko, 1969
- Cixius sanctangeli O.G. Costa, 1834
- Cixius sibiricus Emeljanov, 1979
- Cixius sidnicus Stål, 1859
- Cixius similis Kirschbaum, 1868
- Cixius simplex (Herrich-Schäffer, 1835)
- Cixius sticticus Rey, 1891
- Cixius stigmaticus (Germar, 1818)
- Cixius tacandus Hoch & Asche, 1993
- Cixius trirhacoides Remane & Holzinger, 1998
- Cixius ukrainicus Logvinenko, 1974
- Cixius variabilis Metcalf, 1936
- Cixius verticalis Noualhier, 1897
- Cixius wagneri China, 1942
