= Glisachaemus =

Glisachaemus Temporal range: Early Eocene

Scientific classification
- Kingdom: Animalia
- Phylum: Arthropoda
- Class: Insecta
- Order: Hemiptera
- Suborder: Auchenorrhyncha
- Infraorder: Fulgoromorpha
- Family: Cixiidae
- Genus: †Glisachaemus
- Species: †G. jonasdamzeni

Binomial name
- †Glisachaemus jonasdamzeni Szwedo, 2007

Extinct genus of true bugs

Glisachaemus is an extinct monotypic genus of planthopper in the Cixiidae subfamily Cixiinae and at present, it contains the single species Glisachaemus jonasdamzeni. The genus is solely known from the Early Eocene Baltic amber deposits in the Baltic Sea region of Europe.

== History and classification ==
Glisachaemus jonasdamzeni is known only from one fossil, the holotype, number "No. 20067". It is a single male individual preserved in a clear yellow amber specimen with several unidentified Collembola associated and a parasitic mite on its dorsal surface. The specimen is complete, with only the right foreleg detached, but associated close by the body. The male was entombed while in flight posture, with both the hemelytra and hindwings spread. The amber is currently residing in the private collection of Jonas Damzen, Vilnius, Lithuania. The specimen is to be donated to the Museum of Amber Inclusions, University of Gdańsk in Gdańsk, Poland with the accession number "MIB 5075". G. jonasdamzeni was first studied by Jacek Szwedo, with his 2007 type description being published in the journal Alavesia. The generic name was coined by Jacek Szwedo as a combination of the Old Prussian word glisis, meaning "amber", and Flachaemus, a modern planthopper genus. This is in reference preservation of the type specimen and the genus that Glisachaemus is possibly related. The specific epithet "jonasdamzeni" was designated by Jacek Szwedo in honor of the collector of the specimen, Jonas Damzen.

== Description ==
Glisachaemus jonasdamzeni is 3.85 millimetres (0.152 in) in length and has a wing span of 8 millimetres (0.31 in). Though similar to the related genus Flachaemus of South Africa, there are several notable differences between the genera. Flachaemus has an upper surface of the head which is flat with no border. Glisachaemus in contrast has front edge of upper surface delimited by transverse carina. The upper surface in Glisachaemus is shorter than its width, while in Flachaemus the surface is twice as long as it is broad. Also noted is the grouping of spines along the hind tibia of the genera, in Flachaemus the apical spines are grouped while in Glisachaemus they are not.
