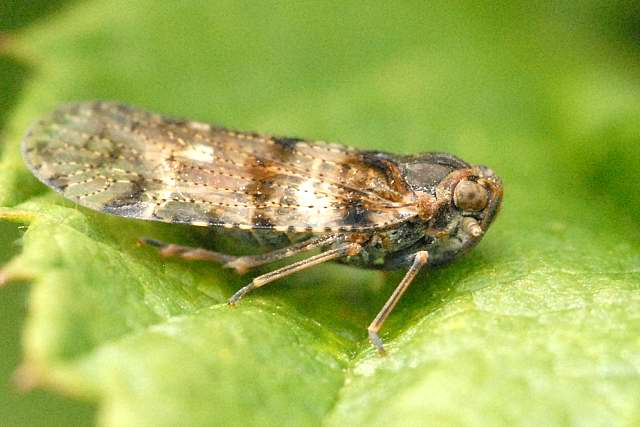
- Cixius nervosus

Scientific classification
- Kingdom: Animalia
- Phylum: Arthropoda
- Clade: Pancrustacea
- Class: Insecta
- Order: Hemiptera
- Suborder: Auchenorrhyncha
- Infraorder: Fulgoromorpha
- Superfamily: Delphacoidea
- Family: Cixiidae; Spinola, 1839

Subfamilies
- Bothriocerinae; Cixiinae; tribe Borysthenini

= Cixiidae =

Cixiidae Temporal range: Barremian to Recent

Family of true bugs

The Cixiidae are a family of fulgoroid insects, one of many families commonly known as planthoppers, distributed worldwide and comprising more than 2,000 species from over 150 genera.

== Taxonomy ==
Genera have been placed in up to three subfamilies, including the Cixiinae, of which sixteen tribes are currently accepted. Fulgoromorpha Lists on the Web includes a monotypic tribe and one genus incertae sedis:

- Borysthenini Emeljanov, 1989 - Africa, Asia
  - Borysthenes Stål, 1866
- Bothriocerinae Muir, 1923 - Americas
  - Chlorodus Johnson & Ledig, 1918
  - tribe Bothriocerini Muir, 1923
    - Bothriobaltia† Szwedo, 2002
    - Bothrioceretta Caldwell, 1950
    - Delwa† Szwedo, 2019
    - Klugga† Szwedo, 2019
    - Liwakka† Szwedo, 2019

== Description ==
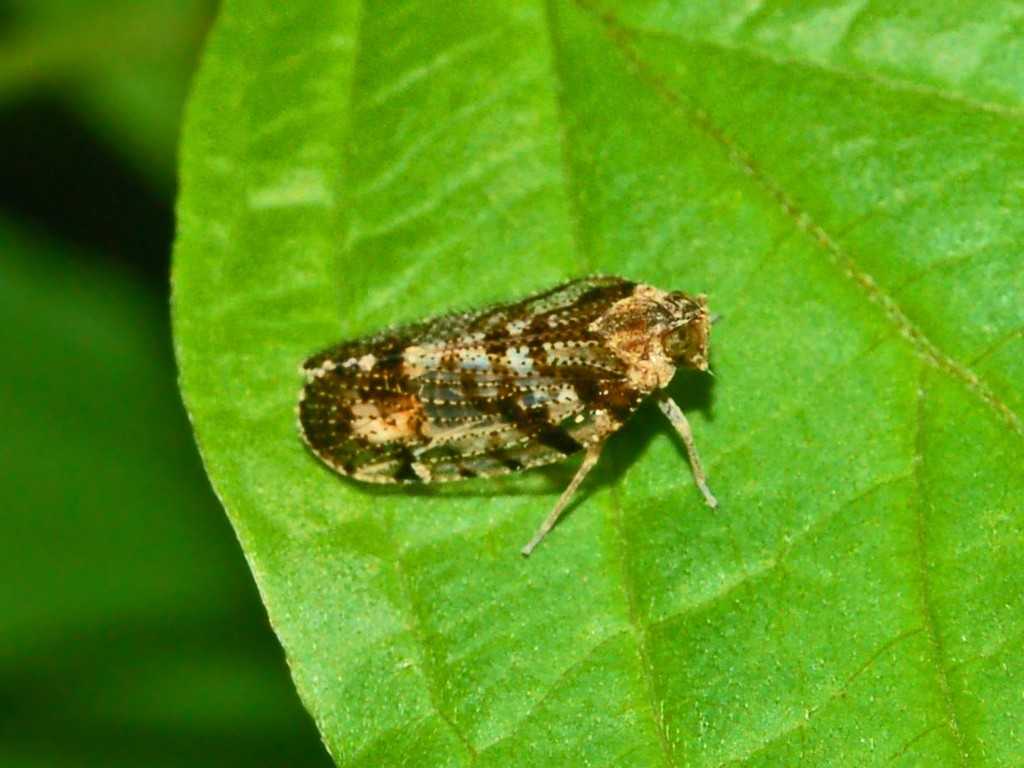
Cixius sp.

Cixiid species are typically comparatively small (body size less than a centimeter) and usually inconspicuous. The face is longer than wide and the head is narrower than the pronotum. The forewings are at least partly transparent and the veins bear minute setae. The hind tibiae end in a cluster of spines and may sometimes have spines along their length. Nymphs live underground, feeding on roots. Adults feed on herbs, shrubs and/or trees; some are polyphagous, while others are specialised on their host plants (monophagous). A couple of species are cavernicolous, feeding on roots in volcanic caves. Females occasionally bear impressive "wax tails" produced by wax-producing plates at the tip of their abdomen.

Several species are of economic importance (e.g. Hyalesthes obsoletus, Haplaxius crudus). Phytoplasma are common parasites in these insects, causing diseases in coconut palms and foliage, grapevines, sugar beets, and lilies.

== Fossil record ==
The fossil record of Cixiidae is limited, and a number of taxa which have placed into the family may need to be reexamined and moved to different families. The oldest confirmed taxa are from the Early Cretaceous with ‘Cixius’ petrinus described from Barremian deposits in England, Longjiangcixius magnus from Santonian to Campanian Nenjiang Formation of China, Karebodopoides aptianus from Hauterivian to Aptian Lebanese amber and Cretofennahia cretacea plus an unnamed specimen from the Aptian of Brazil. Due to the abundant nature of Cixiidae as inclusions in Eocene Baltic amber a number of taxa have been described, including Glisachaemus jonasdamzeni and Autrimpus sambiorum. Several taxa have also been described from Miocene Dominican amber including Oligocixia electrina and Oliarius kulickae.

== See also ==
- List of Cixiidae genera
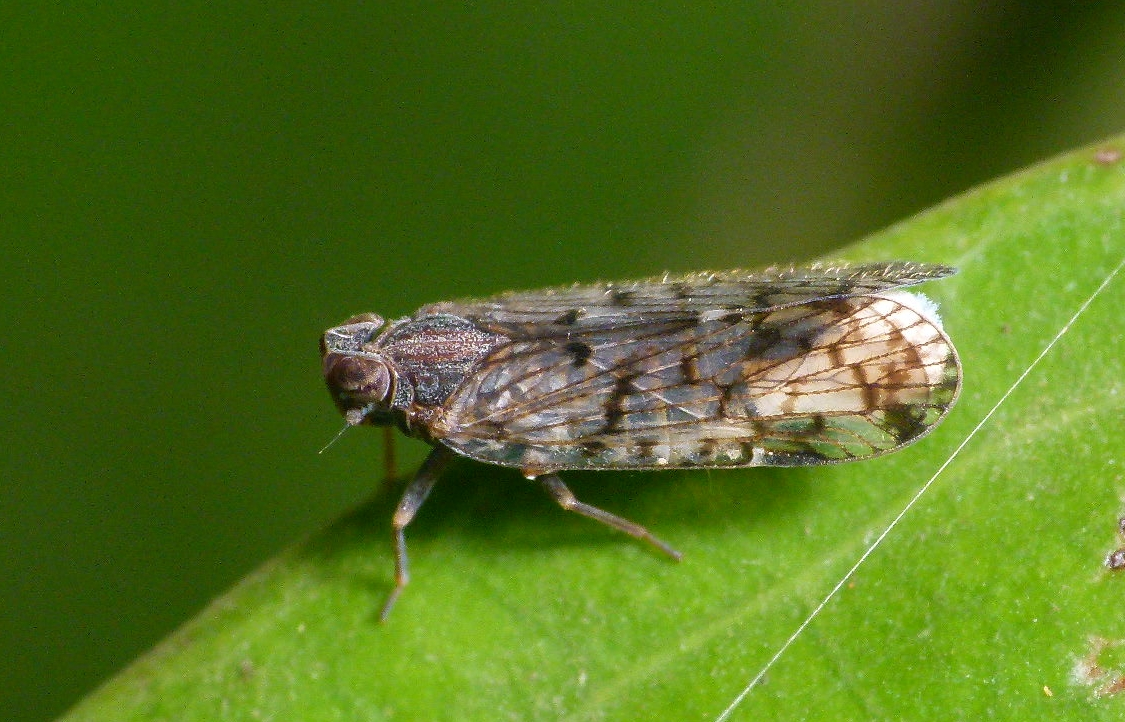

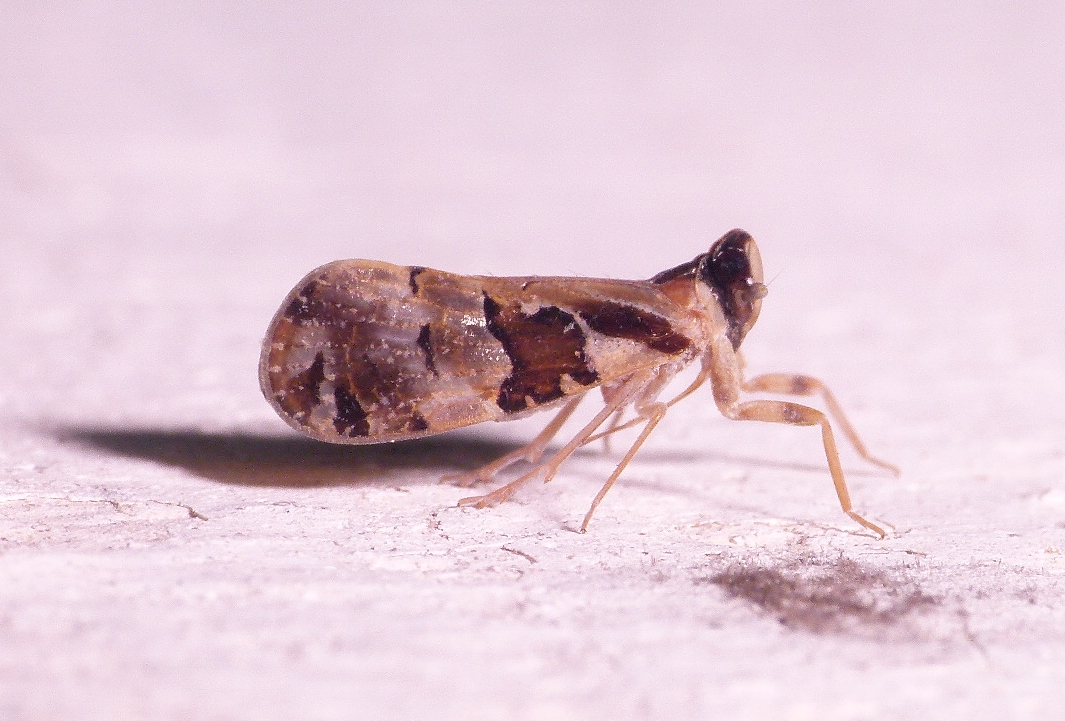

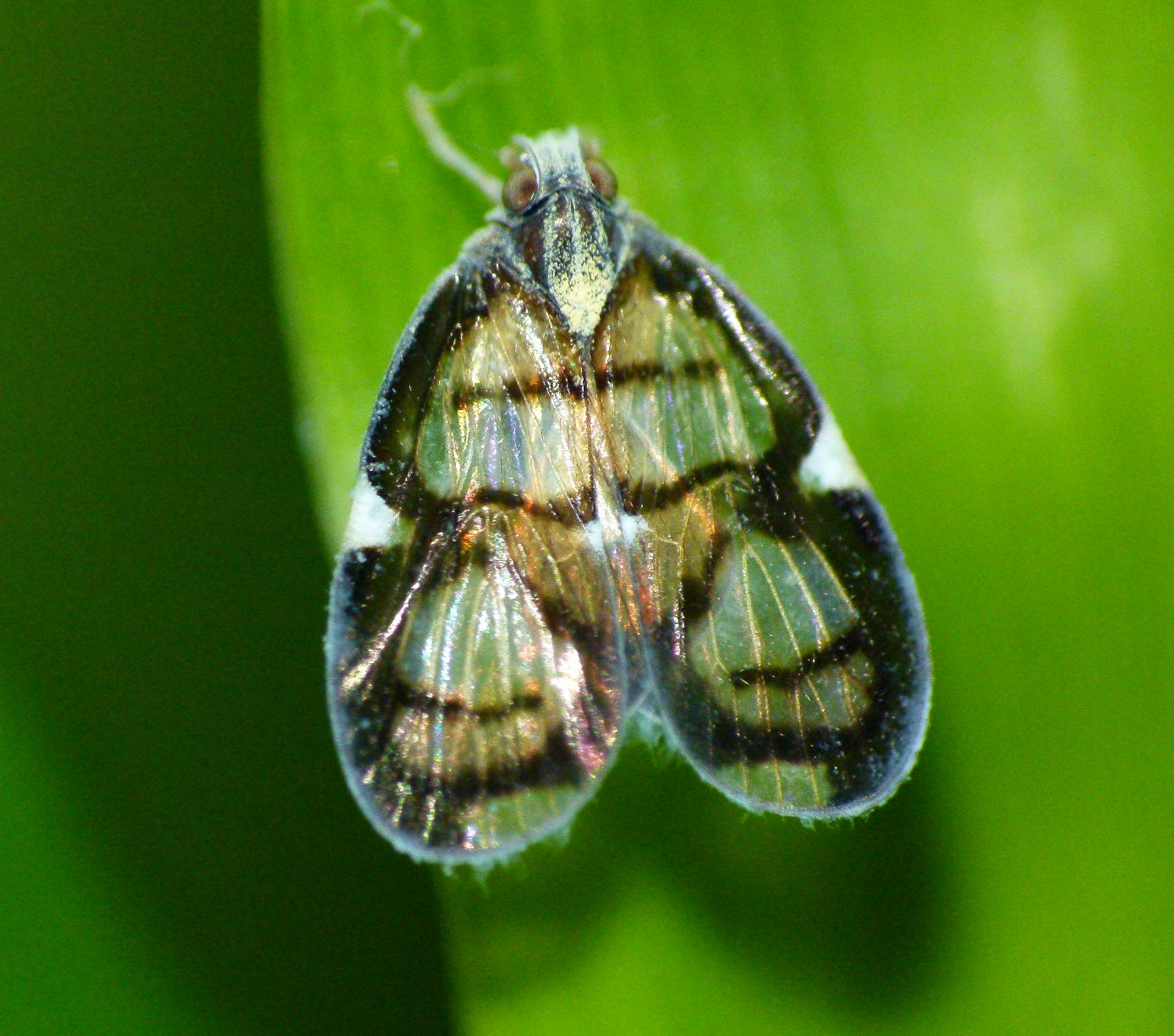
Nilgiris

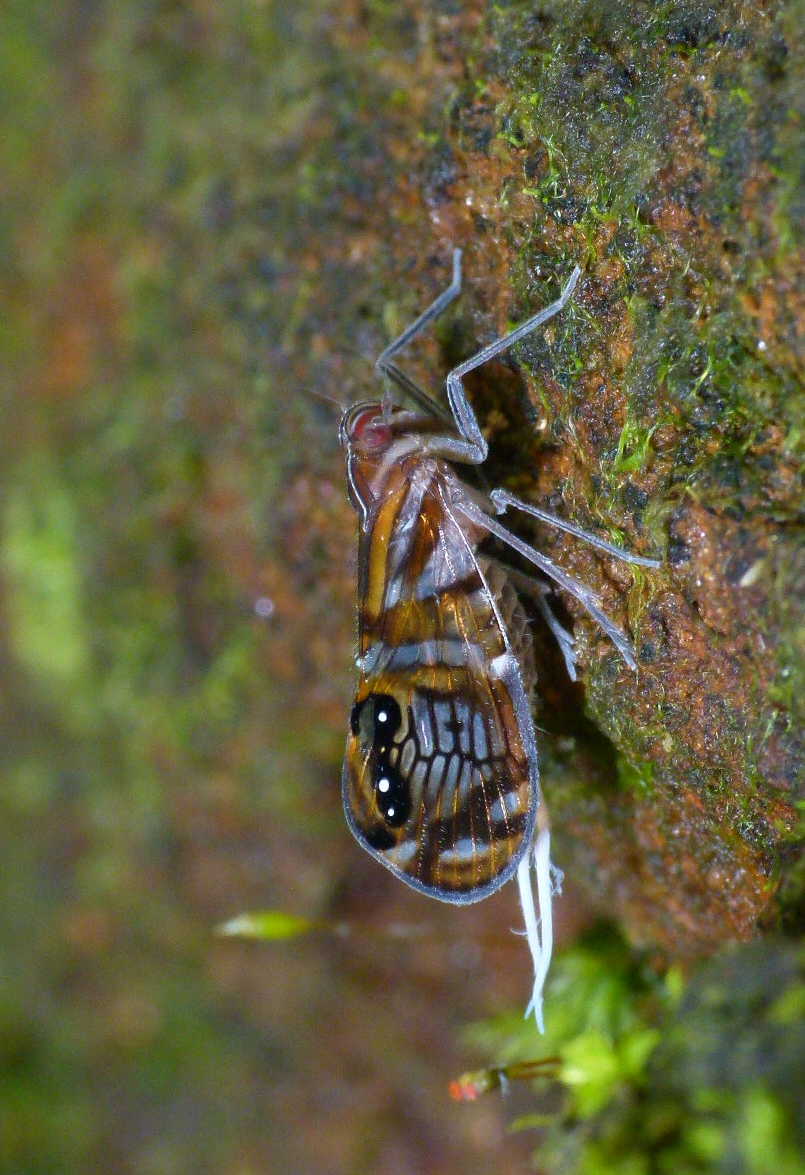
Female Brixia albomaculata showing wax filaments (India)

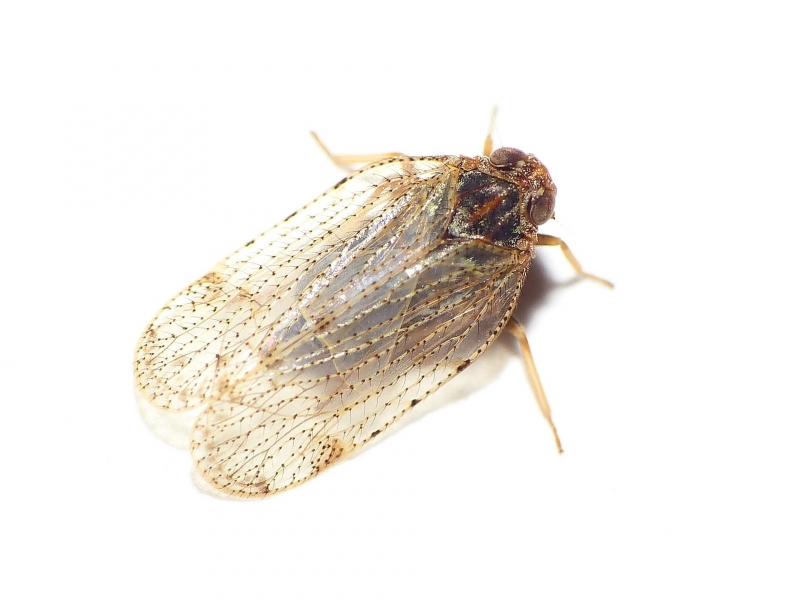
Tachycixius pilosus

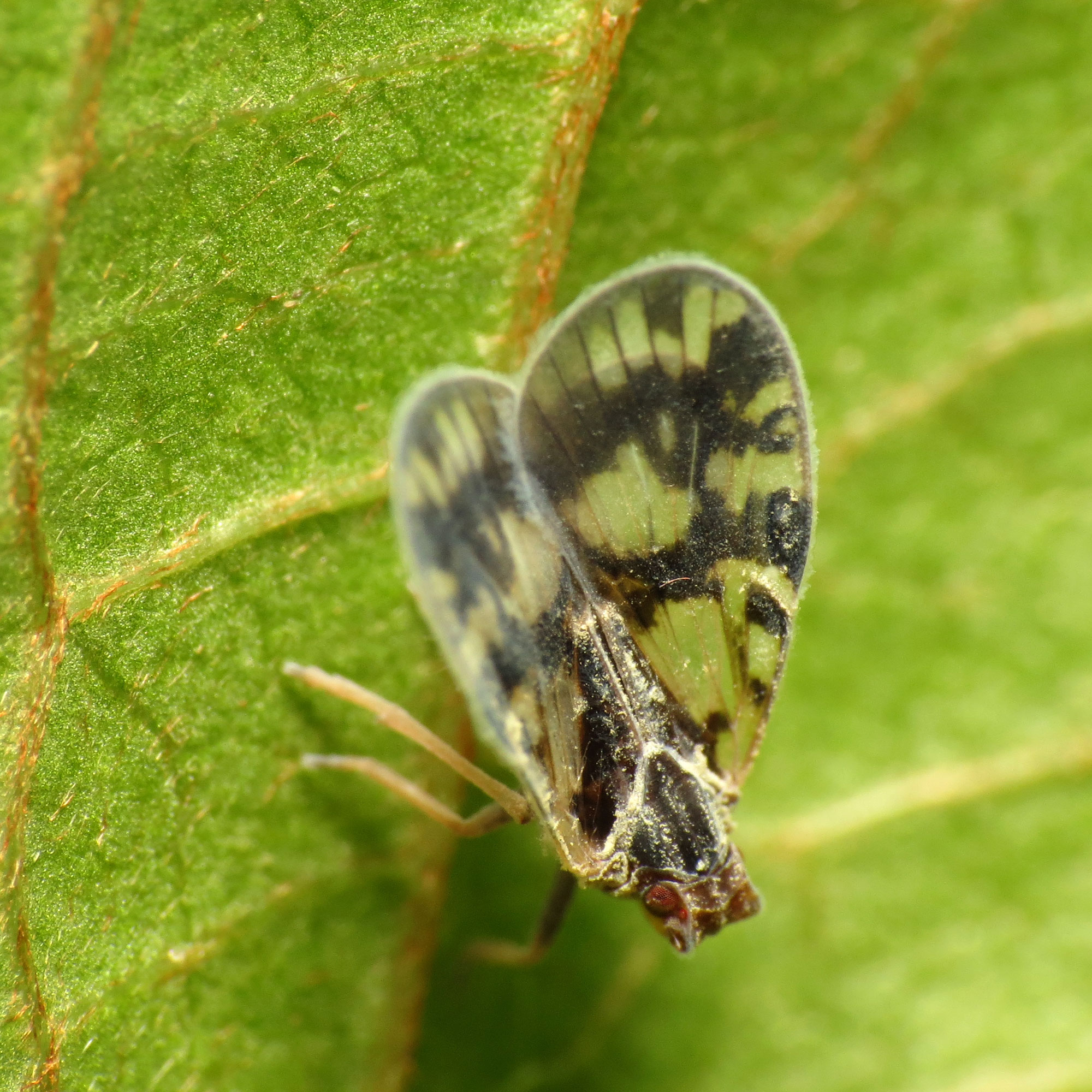
Bothriocera cognita
