= List of MPs who stood down at the 2015 United Kingdom general election =

89 members of Parliament (MPs) chose to not seek reelection at the 2015 general election, meaning they were MPs in the 55th Parliament, but chose not to contest the 2015 general election (in some cases after being deselected by their parties). While at the previous election there had been a record 149 MPs not standing for reelection, the 89 standing down in 2015 represented a more usual number. These 89 consist of 37 Labour, 37 Conservative, 10 Liberal Democrat, 3 Independent, 1 Sinn Féin and 1 Plaid Cymru MP. There were no vacant seats at dissolution.

The highest profile members of Parliament leaving were Gordon Brown, the former prime minister and leader of the Labour Party (both 2007 to 2010) and chancellor of the Exchequer (1997 to 2007); and William Hague, the outgoing First Secretary of State and leader of the House of Commons and former Foreign Secretary (2010 to 2014), leader of the Conservative Party and leader of the Opposition (both 1997 to 2001).

Alongside Brown and Hague, seventeen former cabinet ministers stood down at the election, including Stephen Dorrell, Jack Straw, Alistair Darling, David Blunkett, Sir Peter Tapsell (the Father of the House having served continuously since the 1966 general election, in addition to his previous service), Sir Malcolm Rifkind and Dame Tessa Jowell, all of whom had served at least 23 years in the House of Commons. The highest profile Liberal Democrat to stand down was former leader Sir Menzies Campbell.

== List of MPs ==
In total, 89 members of parliament decided not to stand for re-election.

MP	Seat	First elected	Party	Date announced
Bob Ainsworth	Coventry North East	1992	Labour	7 December 2012
James Arbuthnot	North East Hampshire	1987 (Wanstead and Woodford)	Conservative	6 June 2011
Tony Baldry	Banbury	1983	Conservative	1 September 2014
Gregory Barker	Bexhill and Battle	2001	Conservative	14 July 2014
Hugh Bayley	York Central	1992	Labour	5 December 2014
Alan Beith	Berwick-upon-Tweed	1973 by-election	Liberal Democrats	7 August 2013
Joe Benton	Bootle	1990 by-election	Labour	12 June 2014
Brian Binley	Northampton South	2005	Conservative	22 July 2013
Hazel Blears	Salford and Eccles	1997 (Salford)	Labour	20 February 2014
David Blunkett	Sheffield Brightside and Hillsborough	1987 (Sheffield Brightside)	Labour	21 June 2014
Annette Brooke	Mid Dorset and North Poole	2001	Liberal Democrats	5 March 2013
Gordon Brown	Kirkcaldy and Cowdenbeath	1983 (Dunfermline East)	Labour	1 December 2014
Jeremy Browne	Taunton Deane	2005 (Taunton)	Liberal Democrats	15 October 2014
Malcolm Bruce	Gordon	1983	Liberal Democrats	9 October 2013
Aidan Burley	Cannock Chase	2010	Conservative	5 February 2014
Dan Byles	North Warwickshire	2010	Conservative	20 July 2014
Menzies Campbell	North East Fife	1987	Liberal Democrats	9 October 2013
Martin Caton	Gower	1997	Labour	11 March 2012
James Clappison	Hertsmere	1992	Conservative	3 July 2014
Tony Cunningham	Workington	2001	Labour	28 June 2014
Alistair Darling	Edinburgh South West	1987 (Edinburgh Central)	Labour	2 November 2014
John Denham	Southampton Itchen	1992	Labour	7 October 2011
Frank Dobson	Holborn and St Pancras	1979 (Holborn and St Pancras South)	Labour	18 July 2014
Frank Doran	Aberdeen North	1987 (Aberdeen South)	Labour	19 October 2013
Stephen Dorrell	Charnwood	1979 (Loughborough)	Conservative	25 November 2014
Jonathan Evans	Cardiff North	1992 (Brecon and Radnorshire)	Conservative	17 January 2013
Don Foster	Bath	1992	Liberal Democrats	8 January 2014
Hywel Francis	Aberavon	2001	Labour	22 November 2013
Lorraine Fullbrook	South Ribble	2010	Conservative	14 September 2013
William Hague	Richmond (Yorks)	1989 by-election	Conservative	14 July 2014
Peter Hain	Neath	1991 by-election	Labour	6 June 2014
David Hamilton	Midlothian	2001	Labour	24 January 2015
Dai Havard	Merthyr Tydfil and Rhymney	2001	Labour	24 September 2014
David Heath	Somerton and Frome	1997	Liberal Democrats	11 October 2013
Charles Hendry	Wealden	1992 (High Peak)	Conservative	1 March 2013
David Heyes	Ashton-under-Lyne	2001	Labour	1 March 2014
Mark Hoban	Fareham	2001	Conservative	23 January 2015
Glenda Jackson	Hampstead and Kilburn	1992 (Hampstead and Highgate)	Labour	23 June 2011
Siân James	Swansea East	2005	Labour	25 February 2014
Eric Joyce	Falkirk	2000 by-election (as Labour)	Independent	2 March 2012
Chris Kelly	Dudley South	2010	Conservative	31 August 2014
Andrew Lansley	South Cambridgeshire	1997	Conservative	15 July 2014
Jessica Lee	Erewash	2010	Conservative	20 January 2014
Elfyn Llwyd	Dwyfor Meirionnydd	1992 (Meirionnydd Nant Conwy)	Plaid Cymru	19 October 2013
Andy Love	Edmonton	1997	Labour	12 January 2015
Peter Luff	Mid Worcestershire	1992 (Worcester)	Conservative	5 September 2012
Francis Maude	Horsham	1983 (North Warwickshire)	Conservative	1 February 2015
Jim McGovern	Dundee West	2005	Labour	3 April 2015
Anne McGuire	Stirling	1997	Labour	14 January 2014
Anne McIntosh	Thirsk and Malton	1997 (Vale of York)	Conservative	31 January 2014 (Note: deselected by local Conservative association.)
Andrew Miller	Ellesmere Port and Neston	1992	Labour	10 December 2013
Austin Mitchell	Great Grimsby	1977 by-election	Labour	16 April 2014
George Mudie	Leeds East	1992	Labour	4 October 2013
Meg Munn	Sheffield Heeley	2001	Labour	25 January 2014
Conor Murphy	Newry and Armagh	2005	Sinn Féin	21 October 2014
Paul Murphy	Torfaen	1987	Labour	30 January 2015
Brooks Newmark	Braintree	2005	Conservative	11 October 2014
Stephen O'Brien	Eddisbury	1999 by-election	Conservative	9 March 2015
Richard Ottaway	Croydon South	1983 (Nottingham North)	Conservative	27 October 2012
Jim Paice	South East Cambridgeshire	1987	Conservative	8 March 2013
Dawn Primarolo	Bristol South	1987	Labour	11 November 2011
John Randall	Uxbridge and South Ruislip	1997 (Uxbridge)	Conservative	10 July 2014
Nick Raynsford	Greenwich and Woolwich	1986 by-election (Fulham)	Labour	22 March 2013
Malcolm Rifkind	Kensington	1974 (Edinburgh Pentlands, elected as Conservative) (Note: Originally elected at the February 1974 election.)	Independent	24 February 2015
Linda Riordan	Halifax	2005	Labour	12 February 2015
Andrew Robathan	South Leicestershire	1992 (Blaby)	Conservative	22 September 2014
Hugh Robertson	Faversham and Mid Kent	2001	Conservative	14 January 2015
Lindsay Roy	Glenrothes	2008 by-election	Labour	6 November 2013
Joan Ruddock	Lewisham Deptford	1987	Labour	12 January 2013
David Ruffley	Bury St Edmunds	1997	Conservative	28 July 2014
Laura Sandys	South Thanet	2010	Conservative	25 November 2013
Richard Shepherd	Aldridge-Brownhills	1979	Conservative	24 October 2014
Mark Simmonds	Boston and Skegness	2001	Conservative	11 August 2014
John Stanley	Tonbridge and Malling	1974	Conservative	23 March 2012
Jack Straw	Blackburn	1979 (as Labour)	Independent	25 October 2013
Andrew Stunell	Hazel Grove	1997	Liberal Democrats	29 September 2013
Gerry Sutcliffe	Bradford South	1994 by-election	Labour	28 May 2014
Ian Swales	Redcar	2010	Liberal Democrats	11 July 2014
Peter Tapsell	Louth and Horncastle	1959 (Nottingham West)	Conservative	21 March 2014
Joan Walley	Stoke-on-Trent North	1987	Labour	15 November 2013
Robert Walter	North Dorset	1997	Conservative	5 December 2014
David Watts	St Helens North	1997	Labour	3 January 2015
Mike Weatherley	Hove	2010	Conservative	3 July 2014
David Willetts	Havant	1992	Conservative	14 July 2014
Mike Wood	Batley and Spen	1997	Labour	28 February 2014
Shaun Woodward	St Helens South and Whiston	1997 (Witney)	Labour	7 November 2013
Sarah Teather	Brent Central	2003 by-election (Brent East)	Liberal Democrats	7 September 2013
Tim Yeo	South Suffolk	1983	Conservative	3 February 2014
George Young	North West Hampshire	1974 (Acton)	Conservative	29 November 2013
