= Bootle by-election =

Bootle by-election may refer to one of three parliamentary by-elections held for the British House of Commons constituency of Bootle, in Merseyside:

- 1911 Bootle by-election
- May 1990 Bootle by-election
- November 1990 Bootle by-election

== See also ==
- Bootle (UK Parliament constituency)
