= Royden baronets =

Baronetcy in the Baronetage of the United Kingdom

Escutcheon of the Royden baronets of Frankby Hall

The Royden baronetcy, of Frankby Hall in the County Palatine of Chester, is a title in the Baronetage of the United Kingdom. It was created on 29 July 1905 for Thomas Royden, head of Thomas Royden & Sons, shipowners. He also served as Lord Mayor of Liverpool and represented Toxteth West in the House of Commons as a Conservative. His eldest son, the 2nd Baronet, was Chairman of the Cunard Line and sat as Member of Parliament for Bootle. On 28 January 1944 he was created Baron Royden, of Frankby in the County Palatine of Chester, in the Peerage of the United Kingdom. The peerage became extinct on his death in 1950; while he was succeeded in the baronetcy by his younger brother, the 3rd Baronet.

== Royden baronets, of Frankby Hall (1905) ==
- Sir Thomas Bland Royden, 1st Baronet (1831–1917)
- Sir Thomas Royden, 2nd Baronet (1871–1950) (created Baron Royden in 1944)

== Barons Royden (1944) ==
- Thomas Royden, 1st Baron Royden (1871–1950)

== Royden baronets, of Frankby Hall (1905; reverted) ==
- Sir Ernest Bland Royden, 3rd Baronet (1873–1960)
- Sir John Ledward Royden, 4th Baronet (1907–1976)
- Sir Christopher John Royden, 5th Baronet (1937–2017)
- Sir John Michael Joseph Royden, 6th Baronet (born 1965)

The heir presumptive is the present holder's brother Richard Thomas Bland Royden (born 1967).

== Extended family ==
Agnes Maude Royden was the youngest child of the 1st Baronet.

Baronetage of the United Kingdom
Preceded by Holcroft baronets	Royden baronets of Frankby Hall; 29 July 1905	Succeeded by Stern baronets
