= Sir Thomas Royden, 1st Baronet =

English ship-owner and Conservative Party politician (1831–1917)

Sir Thomas Bland Royden 1st Baronet
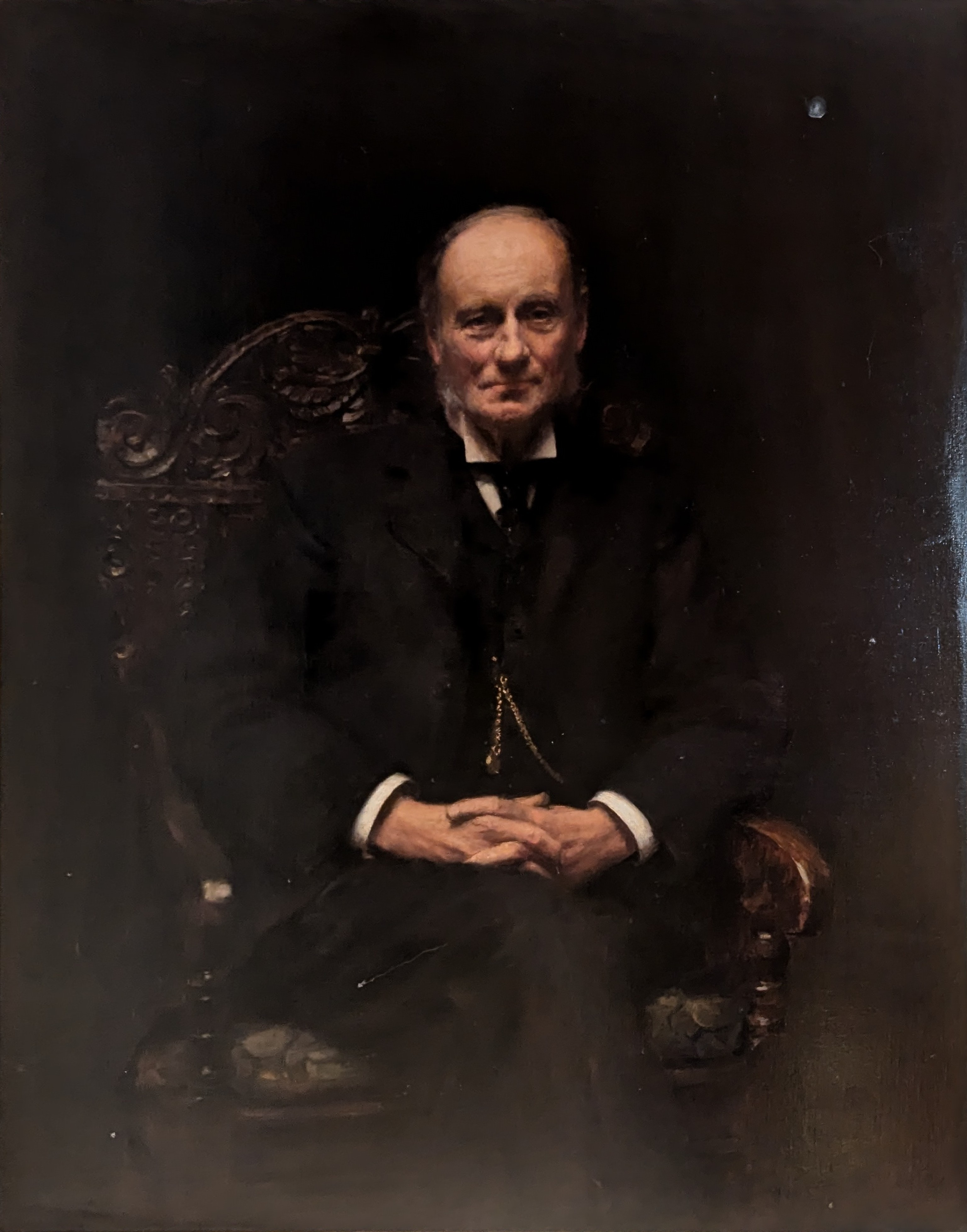
- Portrait of Sir Thomas Bland Royden, found at Netherfield Place Farm, 1909

Member of Parliament for Liverpool West Toxteth
- In office 1885–1892
- Preceded by: New constituency
- Succeeded by: Sir Robert Houston, Bt.

Personal details
- Born: 20 February 1831
- Died: 29 August 1917 (aged 86)
- Party: Conservative
- Spouse: Alice Elizabeth Dowdall
- Parent: Thomas Royden (father)
- Relatives: Thomas Royden (son); Maude Royden (daughter)
- Education: Liverpool College

Sir Thomas Bland Royden, 1st Baronet (20 February 1831 – 29 August 1917) was an English ship-owner and Conservative Party politician.

Royden was the son of Thomas Royden of Liverpool. He was educated at Liverpool College and became head of Thomas Royden & Sons, shipowners. He became a member of Liverpool City Council in 1873, and was Mayor of Liverpool in 1878–1879. He was also a J.P. for Liverpool. At the 1885 general election Royden was elected Member of Parliament for Liverpool West Toxteth and held the seat until he stood down at the 1892 general election. He was High Sheriff of Cheshire in 1903, was appointed a deputy lieutenant of Cheshire at the end of the year, and was created a Baronet on 29 July 1905. Royden lived at Frankby Hall. He died at the age of 86.

Royden married Alice Elizabeth Dowdall. Their son Thomas Royden was later MP for Bootle and became Lord Royden. Their daughter Maude Royden became a preacher and suffragist.

Parliament of the United Kingdom
New constituency	Member of Parliament for Liverpool West Toxteth; 1885 – 1892	Succeeded by Sir Robert Houston, Bt.
Baronetage of the United Kingdom
New creation	Baronet (of Frankby Hall); 1905–1917	Succeeded by Thomas Royden
