= James Clappison =

British barrister & Conservative Party politician (born 1956)

Parliamentary Under-Secretary of State for Environment
- In office 6 July 1995 – 2 May 1997
- Prime Minister: John Major
- Preceded by: Robert Jones
- Succeeded by: Angela Eagle

Member of Parliament for Hertsmere
- In office 9 April 1992 – 30 March 2015
- Preceded by: Cecil Parkinson
- Succeeded by: Oliver Dowden

Personal details
- Born: 14 September 1956 (age 69) Beverley, East Riding of Yorkshire, England
- Party: Conservative
- Spouse: Helen Margherita Carter
- Children: 4
- Education: The Queen's College, Oxford (BA)
- Occupation: Barrister, politician

William James Clappison (born 14 September 1956), commonly known as James Clappison, is a British barrister and Conservative Party politician. He serves as Vice Chairman of the Conservative Friends of Israel group.

== Early life ==
The son of a Yorkshire farmer, Clappison was born in Beverley, East Riding of Yorkshire and educated at the independent St Peter's School, York, before attending The Queen's College, Oxford where he graduated with a Bachelor of Arts degree in philosophy, politics and economics in 1978. While at Oxford he was a member of the Oxford University Conservative Association and was elected to the presidency of the Junior Common Room of his college. In 1981 he was called to the bar from Gray's Inn and has been a practising barrister since then.

== Parliamentary career ==
He contested the safe Labour parliamentary seat of Barnsley East at the 1987 general election where he came second, some 23,511 votes behind Terry Patchett. He also contested the Yorkshire South European Parliament seat at the Euro elections of 1989. He was selected to fight the May 1990 Bootle by-election following the death of Allan Roberts. He was defeated by Mike Carr by 23,517 votes. Carr served as the Labour MP for Bootle for just 57 days before he died of a heart attack on 20 July 1990. Clappison contested Bootle again at the November by-election where he was defeated heavily once more by the new Labour candidate Joe Benton to the tune of 19,465 votes. He was rewarded for his efforts by securing the nomination for the safe Conservative seat of Hertsmere, which became vacant on the retirement of Cecil Parkinson. James Clappison was safely elected at the 1992 general election with a majority of 18,735.

On his election he became the parliamentary private secretary to Emily Blatch at the Department of Education, and from 1994 at the Home Office. He was promoted to government by John Major in 1995 as the parliamentary under-secretary of state at the Department for the Environment until the defeat of the Major government at the 1997 general election. Following the 1997 general election, Clappison served as a Shadow Home Office Minister, before being moved to Education and Employment by William Hague in 1999 and then to be a Shadow Treasury Minister in 2000. Under the leadership of Iain Duncan Smith he was a Shadow Work and Pensions Minister until he left the frontbench in 2002. He served as a member of the Home Affairs Select committee afterwards. He was Shadow Work and Pensions Minister again until the 2010 general election.

Clappison did not seek re-election as an MP at the 2015 general election.

== Personal life ==
Clappison married Helen Carter in July 1984 with whom he has four children.

Parliament of the United Kingdom
Preceded by Cecil Parkinson	Member of Parliament for Hertsmere; 1992–2015	Succeeded by Oliver Dowden
