= Peter Mahon (politician) =

Peter Mahon (4 May 1909 – 29 September 1980) was a British Labour, and later Liberal, politician.

Mahon was born into a Roman Catholic family of Irish descent in Bootle which was immersed in Liverpool Labour politics. He joined the Labour Party in 1924, at the age of 15. His father, Alderman Simon Mahon (1886–1961), was a local politician, who also stood unsuccessfully for Parliament. His brother, Simon Mahon, was elected MP for Bootle in 1955. His great-nephew, Peter Dowd, is the present Labour MP for Bootle, and served as Shadow Chief Secretary to the Treasury until 2020.

In 1954, Mahon was selected as parliamentary candidate for the marginal seat of Blackburn West, but the seat was abolished by redistribution prior to the 1955 general election. Almost a decade later he was selected for the "bellwether" marginal seat of Preston South, a constituency with a significant Catholic population.

At the 1964 general election, he was elected as Member of Parliament for Preston South, defeating the sitting Conservative MP Alan Green by only 348 votes. He held the seat at the 1966 election with an increased majority, but at the 1970 general election, Green retook the seat with a majority of over 1,300.

On his election, Mahon introduced a Private Members Bill, to remove the necessity of applying for Probate in winding-up the estate of a poor person. The bill passed into law as the Administration of Estates (Small Payments) Act 1965. During his time in parliament, Mahon was a vociferous opponent of relaxation of the Abortion Laws, and in 1966 was responsible for the failure of David Steel's first attempt to introduce an Abortion reform bill, by his use of the parliamentary device of "talking out." In 1971, Mahon sought the Labour party nomination in the Liverpool Scotland by-election, the seat with the largest Irish Catholic electorate in Britain; his brother Simon Mahon was Labour MP for the adjoining seat of Bootle. Peter Mahon was not selected, and instead stood in the by-election as an Independent "Labour and Anti-Abortion" candidate, securing a respectable 10.3% of the vote. He was expelled from the Labour party, and in 1973 he joined the Liberals. He subsequently sat as a Liberal councillor on Liverpool City Council and Liverpool Metropolitan District Council.

His grandson, Peter Garrett (b. 1966), former research director of LIFE, was a member of the Labour party until he resigned in 2000 in opposition to the party's stance on human cloning. He stood in the 2000 Preston by-election for the Preston Alliance, a group which campaigned for respect for human life and was endorsed by the Christian Peoples' Alliance.

== Bibliography ==
- Leigh Rayment's Historical List of MPs

Parliament of the United Kingdom
| Preceded by Alan Green | Member of Parliament for Preston South; 1964–1970 | Succeeded by Alan Green |
