= James Burnie =

English businessman and politician (1882–1975)

James Burnie MC (10 May 1882 – 15 May 1975) was an English businessman and Liberal Party politician.

== Family and education ==
Burnie was born in Bootle, Lancashire, the son of Joseph Burnie, a local businessman. He was educated at St John's School, Bootle and at Merchant Taylors' School, Crosby. In 1910, he married Ruth E. Thornton. The couple had a son and a daughter together. The marriage lasted until his wife died in 1939.

== Career ==
Burnie went into his father's business, eventually becoming Director of Bell & Burnie Ltd, specialists in cold store insulation. At the outbreak of the First World War in 1914, Burnie was mobilised as a Sergeant. He retired as a Major in Bootle Battalion, 7th King's Liverpool Regiment, having gained the Military Cross in 1918. He retained his commission after the war and retired from the Territorial Army Reserve of Officers upon reaching the age of fifty. In 1922, Burnie was chosen to formally unveil the new Bootle War memorial dedicated to the memory of over a thousand men from Bootle who had fallen in the First World War in a ceremony which took place on 15 October 1922.

== Politics ==
=== MP ===
Burnie was elected to Parliament as a Liberal at the 1922 general election for his home town of Bootle, gaining the seat from the Conservatives with a majority of 3,409 votes. He held the seat at the 1923 general election, this time in a three-cornered contest with the Conservatives and Labour but with a decreased majority of just 453 votes.

=== Liberals divided ===
In March 1924, he was one of 24 Liberal MPs who voted with the Conservatives and against his own party during an internal split on a Liberal motion deploring the construction of five new naval cruisers Around this time, the Liberal Party was frequently divided in Parliament over its stance towards the First Labour Government of Prime Minister Ramsay MacDonald. Even on the initial vote to bring down the Conservative government of Stanley Baldwin and install Labour's minority administration, ten Liberal MPs voted with the Conservatives.

=== 1924 ===
The sort of difficulties which beset the Liberal Party in Parliament were apparent nationally at the 1924 general election. The Liberals were finding it difficult to define their political position in relation to the Labour and Conservative parties and electorally, as the third party in a two-party system, they were being targeted and squeezed by the others. These electoral currents proved too strong for Burnie and in another three-cornered fight in Bootle he lost his seat to the Conservative candidate Vivian Leonard Henderson and finished in third place behind Labour's John Kinley; who would later serve as the MP for Bootle from 1929 to 1931 and again from 1945 to 1955.

=== 1924-1950 ===
Burnie did not stand again until the 1935 general election, when he again contested Bootle for the Liberal Party, only just managing to save his deposit. The following year, he was elected Mayor of Bootle He was selected as the Liberal candidate for Chester after the 1935 election but never fought the seat. He did return to the political fray for the 1950 general election however, contesting one of Bootle's near neighbours, Crosby but this seems to have been his last attempt to get back into the House of Commons.

== Death ==
Burnie died on 15 May 1975, aged 93 years.

Parliament of the United Kingdom
Preceded by Sir Thomas Royden, Bt.	Member of Parliament for Bootle; 1922 – 1924	Succeeded by Vivian Henderson
