= 1954 Aldershot by-election =

UK Parliamentary by-election

The 1954 Aldershot by-election was held on 28 October 1954 when the Incumbent Conservative MP, Oliver Lyttelton was elevated to a new hereditary peerage, as Viscount Chandos. The by-election was won by the Conservative candidate Eric Errington.

1954 Aldershot by-election: Aldershot
Party	Candidate	Votes	%	±%
Conservative	Eric Errington	19,108	60.1	−0.2
Labour	W Cuthbertson	12,701	39.9	+0.2
Majority		6,407	20.2	−0.5
Turnout		31,809	58.7	−19.1
Conservative hold		Swing	-0.2	
