= Wafik Moustafa =

British politician

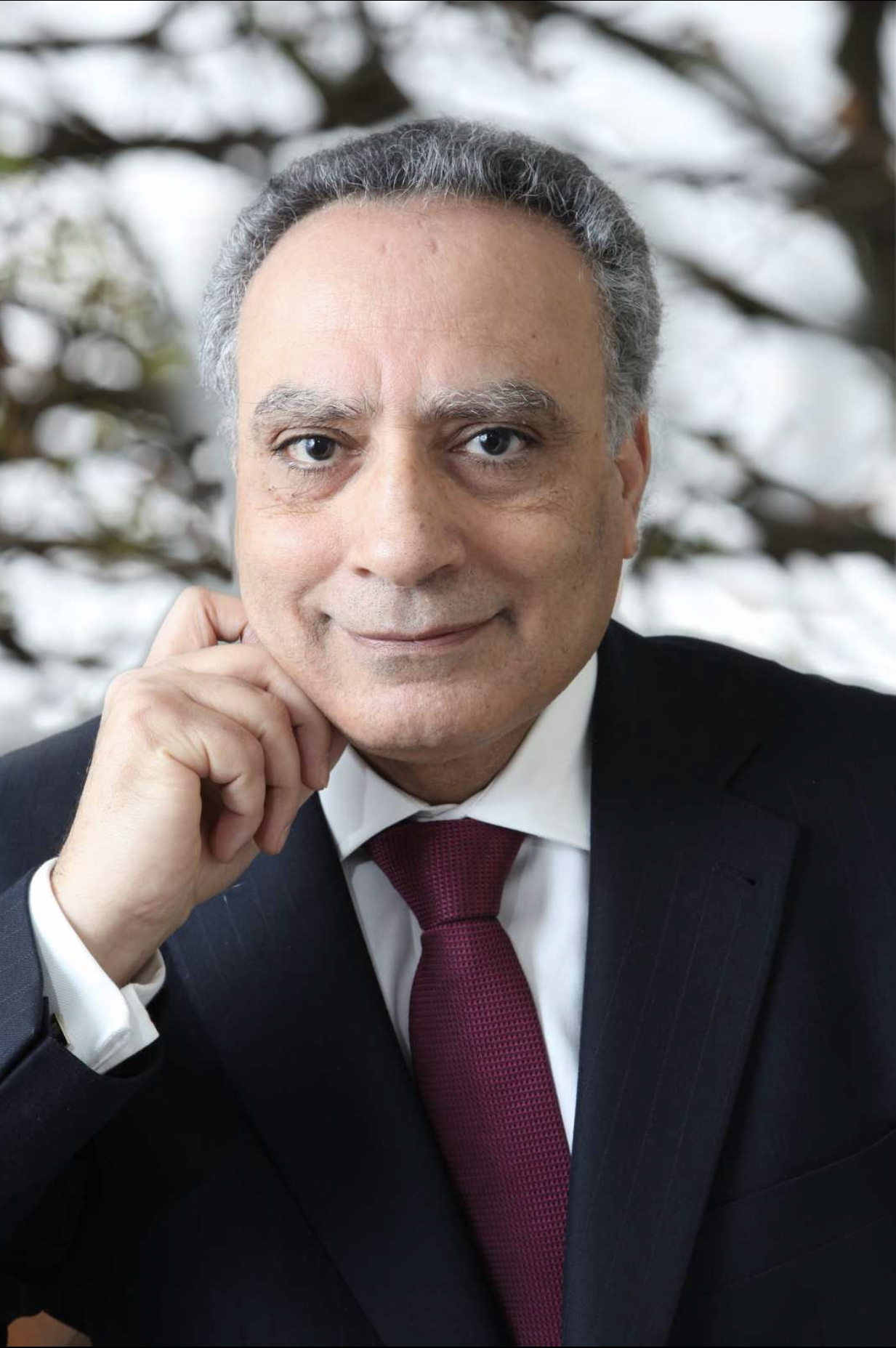
- Portrait, 2018

Personal details
- Born: Wafik Moustafa; 16 July 1948 (age 78) Cairo, Egypt
- Website: Official website

Wafik Moustafa (Arabic: وفيق مصطفى, born 16 July in Cairo) is a London-based doctor and British politician, author and political commentator on several Middle Eastern and international TV channels. He is the author of Glass House – The Arab World’s Eventful Century, Egypt – The Elusive Arab Spring, Egypt - A Nation in Crisis, published in London, as well as the founder and Chairman of the British Arab Network.

== Professional career ==
BBC Radio Arabic Service broadcast a two-hour special programme in August 2014 about Moustafa's career, social and political activities in the UK, including discussion about his book Egypt the Elusive Arab Spring.

== Political activities ==
Moustafa stood as a Conservative candidate for Bootle in Sefton, Merseyside in 2005. In this traditionally safe Labour seat, he came a distant third behind the Liberal Democrats. Moustafa also founded the Conservative Arab Network (CAN).

As a representative of the Muslim Conservative Network UK, Moustafa attended a session on The Role of Parliaments for Building Peaceful and Inclusive Societies and Combating Violent extremism at the United Nations Headquarters in New York on 21 July 2016.

He attended the International Symposium on Cultural Diplomacy and Religion 2014, "The Promotion of World Peace through Inter-Faith Dialogue & the Unity of Faiths".

In July 2014, Moustafa delivered a keynote speech at the Inter-Parliamentary Coalition for Global Ethics conference (IPCGE) held at UNESCO HQ in Paris. His theme message was "We have to think culture of peace to achieve global harmony".

Moustafa spoke at DAVOS Greek House on 15 January 2024 about the need to eliminate the culture of hate from textbooks and about the reform of the education system in Middle Eastern countries.

== Author ==
Glass House - The Arab World’s Eventful Century, published in 2023 - Dr Moustafa’s moral assessment of the decline and eventual disolution of the Ottoman Empire and the subsequent effects of that on the Arab world.

Egypt - A nation in Crisis, published in 2016, is a book that covers the upheavals that took place in Egypt and other Arab countries and particular emphasis on the military coup led by General Sisi, the top of the first elected President in Egyptian history. It also expands on the role of the United States in the Middle East over the last two centuries.

On the third anniversary of the Arab Spring in Egypt, in 2014, Gilgamesh in London published Moustafa's book Egypt – The Elusive Arab Spring.

== Media activities ==
Moustafa specialises in the culture and political history of the Middle East and the Arab world in particular. He is a commentator on British Arabs and Middle Eastern affairs, regularly appearing on television, radio and other media. His notable media appearances include:

- Inside Story – Al Jazeera (discussion of more homes facing demolition as Egyptian security forces warn people a buffer zone with Gaza is to be extended)
- Levant TV – talking about stifling freedom at Egyptian universities and the detention of 25,000 political activists from the Islamist and liberal opposition.
- ANB TV, when he discussed his book and explained how the Arab Spring has been aborted by the entrenched elements of the old regime and the military establishment.
- Eurovision Italy – interview in Rome on the Arab Spring and the current political and civil situation in Egypt.

He was appointed the main political commentator for Al Jazeera TV for the 2005 UK general election (at which he was a Conservative candidate) and the main commentator for Sky News during the Egyptian uprising in 2011.

Moustafa was a guest speaker at the Cairo International Media Conference in 2010, post-WikiLeaks, and at the televised debate on the future of Egypt and the Arab world in Lebanon.
