= Orrell, Merseyside =

Coordinates: 53.4683°N 2.9891°W

Orrell
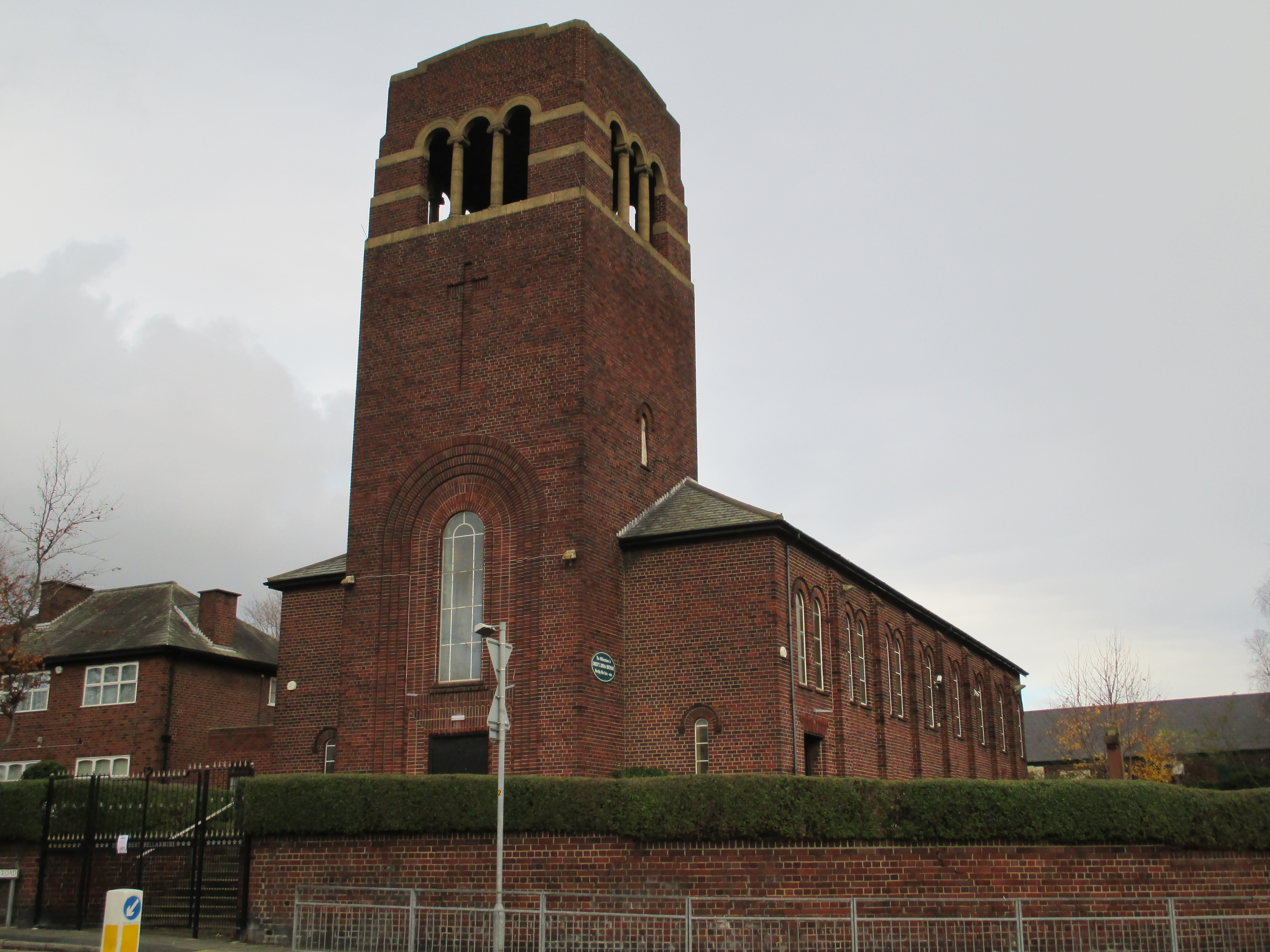
- St. Robert Bellarmine Church, Orrell

- Location within Merseyside
- OS grid reference: SJ345969
- Metropolitan borough: Sefton
- Metropolitan county: Merseyside
- Region: North West
- Country: England
- Sovereign state: United Kingdom
- Post town: BOOTLE
- Postcode district: L20
- Dialling code: 0151
- Police: Merseyside
- Fire: Merseyside
- Ambulance: North West
- UK Parliament: Bootle

Orrell is the name given to a residential area in the Metropolitan Borough of Sefton, Merseyside, England.

== Governance ==
For parliamentary elections Orrell is within the Bootle constituency represented by the Labour Party MP Peter Dowd.

The area itself is part of the electoral ward of Netherton and Orrell for elections to Sefton Council, the ward itself is traditionally represented by the Labour Party; the three current representatives on the council are Susan Ellen Bradshaw, Robert John Brennan, and Ian Ralph Maher.

On 9 November 1905 Orrell became a civil parish, being formed from part of Orrell and Ford, on 1 April 1974 the parish was abolished. In 1951 the parish had a population of 15,581.
