= Jack Kinley =

British politician (1878–1957)

John Kinley (2 November 1878 – 13 January 1957) was a British Labour Party politician.

== Biography ==
Born in Liverpool, Kinley became a hairdresser in nearby Bootle. He joined the Independent Labour Party (ILP) and in 1910 was elected to Bootle Council in the Orrell ward as a Labour councillor, transferring to Knowsley ward in 1918. He became locally known as a popular speaker. He stood for Bootle at the 1923 United Kingdom general election, sponsored by the ILP, as a last-minute replacement for Simon Mahon. He only won 13.8% of the vote, but when another election was held the following year, he had the advantage of a longer campaigning period, and was able to take second place, with 34.7% of the votes cast.

By the 1929 United Kingdom general election, Kinley was a popular figure, known for his consistent advocacy of socialist policies, and he was promoted as "Keep-at-it Kinley". He narrowly won the Bootle constituency, and in Parliament focused much of his time on speaking in support of unemployed and under-employed workers. He became the secretary of the ILP Parliamentary Group in 1931, replacing W. J. Brown, and he also served on the ILP's National Administrative Council. He strongly opposed the manifesto put together by Oswald Mosley, and also argued that the Labour government was too reluctant to take radical action. Like most Labour MPs at that time, he lost his seat at the 1931 United Kingdom general election, but remained a member of the council in Bootle. He opposed the ILP's split from Labour in 1932, and stood as a Labour Party candidate at the 1935 United Kingdom general election, but finished in second place and failed to regain his seat.

Kinley was made an alderman in Bootle in 1936, remaining on the council until 1949. He regained Bootle at the 1945 United Kingdom general election, and although he was less active in this term; he was consistent in supporting socialism and the unemployed. Kinley retained his seat at both the 1950 and 1951 general elections, and hoped to stand again in 1955, but was deselected by his Constituency Labour Party on the grounds of his age. He was succeeded by Simon Mahon, son of Simon Mahon who had been expected to stand at the general election 32 years earlier.

Parliament of the United Kingdom
Preceded by Vivian Henderson	Member of Parliament for Bootle; 1929–1931	Succeeded by Eric Errington
Preceded by Eric Errington	Member of Parliament for Bootle; 1945–1955	Succeeded by Simon Mahon
