= Social Democratic Party (UK, 1988–1990) =

Political party in the United Kingdom

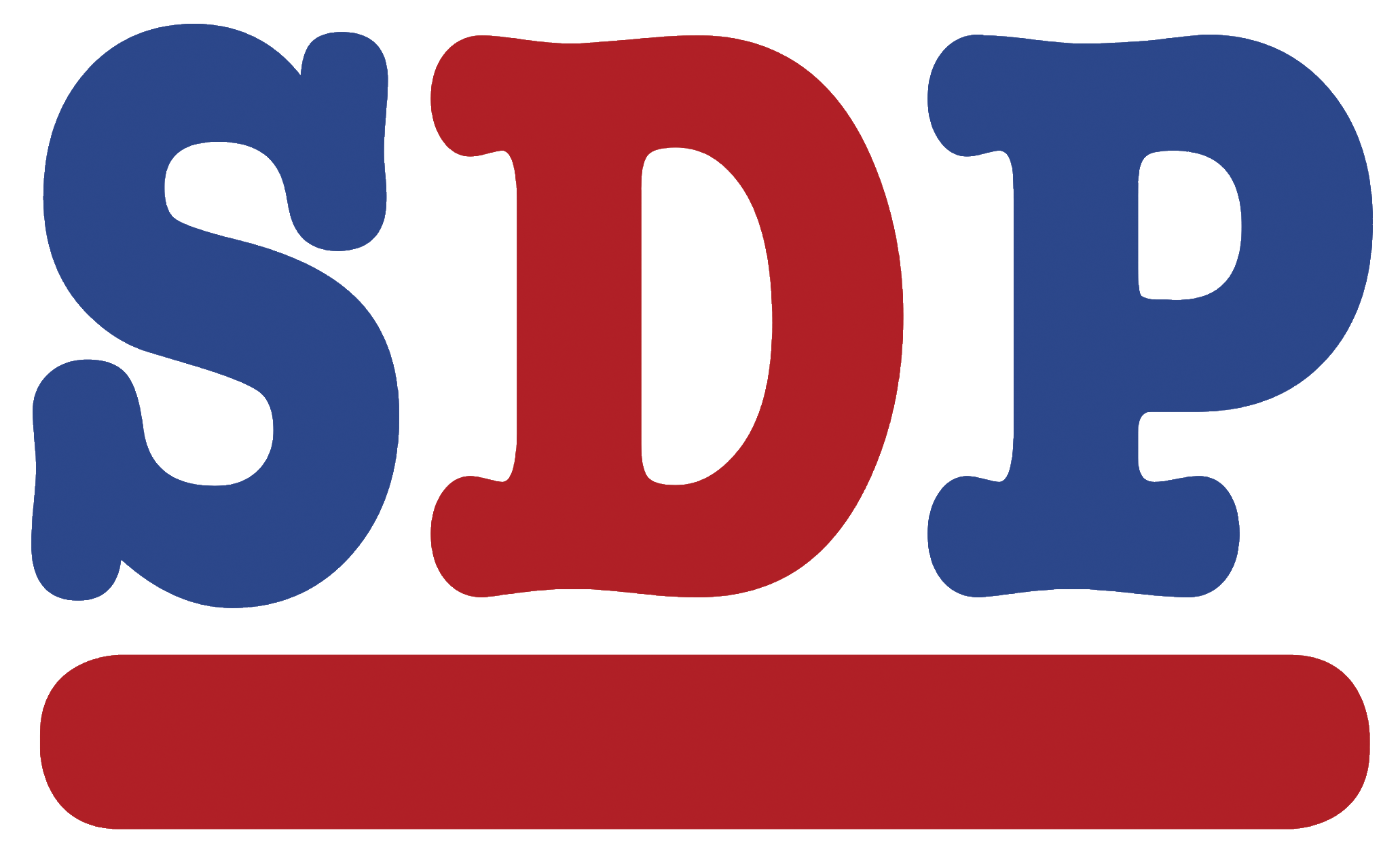
- Abbreviation: SDP
- Founded: 8 March 1988; 38 years ago
- Dissolved: 3 June 1990; 36 years ago
- Split from: Social Democratic Party (1981)
- Succeeded by: Social Democratic Party (1990) (minority)
- Ideology: Social liberalism Social democracy
- Political position: Centre
- Colours: Blue and Red

The Social Democratic Party (SDP) formed in 1988 was a political party in the United Kingdom led by David Owen, which lasted for only two years. A successor party to the original Social Democratic Party (SDP), it was known informally as the "continuing SDP". The "continuing SDP" was dissolved in 1990 in the aftermath of a by-election in Bootle, in which the party's candidate received fewer votes than Screaming Lord Sutch's Official Monster Raving Loony Party.

The party was formed after the first incarnation of the SDP, created in 1981 by the "Gang of Four" (Owen, Roy Jenkins, Bill Rodgers and Shirley Williams, all dissident former ministers from the Labour Party), voted to turn its electoral alliance with the Liberal Party into a full merger of the two parties. The new Social and Liberal Democrats (SLD) party thus gained all of the records and assets of the original SDP; however, three sitting SDP members of parliament — Owen, John Cartwright, and Rosie Barnes — did not join the SLD, opting instead to create a new 'continuing' Social Democratic Party. They were joined by a minority of former members of the original SDP. The new party was not alone in having members who rejected the merger with the Liberal Party to form the SLD: among the Liberals, Michael Meadowcroft led a breakaway faction which created a new Liberal Party the following year.

== Post-merger SDP ==
The post-merger 'continuing' SDP was established on 8 March 1988. It had two major advantages over the Social and Liberal Democrats (later known as the Liberal Democrats). Firstly, it enjoyed the financial support of David Sainsbury, owner of the Sainsbury chain of supermarkets. Secondly, its members regarded David Owen as a charismatic leader who looked and acted the part of a potential Prime Minister. The party also held the allegiance of seventeen members of the House of Lords, led by Baroness Stedman, and was supported by a few public figures, most notably the musician Eric Woolfson and chess grandmaster Nigel Short, both of whom became involved in the party's affairs. Despite an energetic tour of the nation's university campuses by Owen, the party remained very short of active members. A party conference at Paisley Town Hall in 1989 was held behind closed doors without the usual television coverage to conceal the rows of empty seats. A shortage of members left the party exposed to electoral embarrassment if it stood candidates in areas where there was a lack of activists to bring out the vote. Owen later admitted that the party's initial estimate of 25,500 "committed" members had proved to be inaccurate, and that had he been aware of the actual figure of 11,000 from the start he would not have formed the new party.

In addition to its political activity, the 'continuing' SDP also played host to many of the individuals who in 1989 established the Social Market Foundation (SMF), an influential centrist think tank later described by one commentator as "the intellectual legacy of the Owenite rump of the SDP". The SMF was formed primarily as a vehicle for Owen's 'social market' economic ideas, and Owen himself became one of the Foundation's trustees upon its launch. The SMF's first executive director, Lord Kilmarnock, was one of the post-merger SDP peers, while its chairman from 1991 was Robert Skidelsky, Professor of Political Economy at Warwick University, who was responsible for much of the 'continuing' SDP's economic policy, having written a green paper on the social market economy for the party's first conference in September 1988. Two other directors of the SMF, Rick Nye and Daniel Finkelstein, had both been employed as Owen's political advisers, as had Andrew Cooper, who was the Foundation's Head of Research in the mid-1990s. When the SMF became more closely associated with the Major Government following the 'continuing' SDP's demise in 1990, Skidelsky, Finkelstein, Cooper and Nye all joined the Conservatives, with the latter three publicly endorsing the party alongside other ex-Owenites shortly before the 1992 general election.

== By-elections ==
In the Richmond by-election of 1989, held in a constituency where it had an energetic branch and strong local support, the new SDP took second place behind Conservative candidate William Hague, who retained the seat for his party. Shortly afterwards, it contested a seat in Northern Ireland for the first time in the Upper Bann by-election. Previously, the SDP-Liberal Alliance had given support to the Alliance Party of Northern Ireland. The Liberal Democrats continued this policy in Upper Bann. Apart from the Conservative Party, it was, and remains, extremely rare for a party from elsewhere in Britain to contest elections in Northern Ireland. The SDP nominated its own candidate, despite having virtually no local organisation, and finished last with only 154 votes.

=== Bootle by-election ===
On paper, Bootle looked like fertile territory for the SDP – the local Labour Party had faced major problems with the entryist Militant tendency some years before, subsequent boundary changes had incorporated parts of the Crosby constituency into Bootle – nine years after Shirley Williams had won the party its first seat there. However, the party found itself unable to get any significant media attention, vital to compensate for a lack of activists at local level.

The level of political apathy was high, and Bootle was known to be a Labour safe seat – traditionally one of Labour's safest seats nationally. The little media attention that the by-election attracted was focussed on a bizarre row between Labour and the Raving Loonies. Relations between the Labour Party and the Loonies had never been good, but they reached a new low when the Labour agent tried erroneously to have the Loony candidate, party leader Screaming Lord Sutch, arrested for breaking an electoral law that had been changed in 1987. He attempted to have Sutch charged with the former offence of using a public house as an election campaign headquarters. The main by-election headlines in the tabloid newspapers referred to "Kinnock's Killjoys" for the campaign's duration. In the event, when the votes were counted the SDP candidate, Jack Holmes, finished far behind the Official Monster Raving Loony Party, and the SDP suffered even worse publicity than Labour. Within a week of the result, Owen announced that the party's National Executive had voted to dissolve the party, saying that it could not possibly continue after finishing behind the Raving Loonies. The SDP formally dissolved on 3 June 1990.

=== Another breakaway ===
A number of SDP members, however, accused the party's National Executive of arranging the Bootle disaster as a "get-out clause" so that they could resurrect their political careers within the Conservative or Labour Parties. In a repeat of the events of 1988, a number of SDP activists met days after the National Executive had voted for dissolution and, in defiance of the Executive, voted to create a new Social Democratic Party. This group was led by Jack Holmes, whose defeat by the Raving Loonies at Bootle had ensured the party's demise.

== The end ==
Senior members of the 'continuing' SDP scattered in different directions following its dissolution. The party's three MPs all continued to sit as "Independent Social Democrats", although none of them were to join Holmes's new SDP. A number of peers, such as Lord Kilmarnock and Lord Wilson of Langside, essentially pursued the same strategy in the Lords, continuing to describe themselves as "Social Democrats" or "SDP" while sitting on the crossbenches. As mentioned above, many of those close to Owen who were involved in the SMF subsequently became associated with the Conservatives, as did several prominent young 'continuing' SDP activists such as the future MP Rob Wilson. Others, however, joined – or in many cases re-joined – the Labour Party, most notably David Sainsbury, Polly Toynbee, and peers such as Lord Diamond, Lord Kennet, Lord Taylor of Gryfe, and Lord Young of Dartington (who had left the new party as early as 1989, attracted by Labour's change of policy on issues concerning the EEC and Trident). Only a select few members – most notably Lord Perry and Lord Aylestone, the former chair of the SDP peers – gravitated towards the Liberal Democrats, while the party's relative Euroscepticism prompted others, such as the Duke of Devonshire and the future MEP Julia Reid, to eventually support the UK Independence Party (UKIP).

Owen did not contest the 1992 general election. John Cartwright and Rosie Barnes stood under the "Independent Social Democrat" banner they had adopted in the House of Commons, defending their seats in Woolwich and Greenwich respectively. The Liberal Democrats did not run candidates against them, and helped them with their campaigns. The new SDP, now led by John Bates, also aided both MPs in their bids for re-election, as did those councillors who had been elected to Greenwich London Borough Council either as 'continuing' Social Democrats or as Liberal Democrats. Cartwright and Barnes were allowed under Electoral Broadcasting rules to address the whole country in a joint Party Political Broadcast. Both narrowly lost their seats to Labour, which made substantial efforts to win them back.

== Election results ==
=== By-elections ===
Constituency	Date	Candidate	Number of votes	% of votes	Position	Winner
Kensington	14 July 1988	John Martin	1,190	5.0	4th	Conservative
Epping Forest	15 December 1988	Michael Pettman	4,077	12.2	4th	Conservative
Pontypridd	23 February 1989	Terry Thomas	1,199	3.1	5th	Labour
Richmond (Yorks)	23 February 1989	Mike Potter	16,909	32.2	2nd	Conservative
Vale of Glamorgan	4 May 1989	David Keith Davies	1,098	2.3	5th	Labour
Glasgow Central	15 June 1989	Peter Kerr	253	1.0	6th	Labour
Mid Staffordshire	22 March 1990	Ian Wood	1,422	2.5	4th	Labour
Bootle	24 May 1990	Jack Holmes	155	0.4	7th	Labour
Upper Bann	24 May 1990	Alistair Dunn	154	0.4	11th	UUP

=== European elections ===
Year	Number of votes	% of vote	Seats	Position	Winner
1989	75,886	0.5	0	10th	Labour
