= Michael Carr (Labour politician) =

British politician (1947–1990)

Michael Carr MP

Member of Parliament for Bootle
- In office 24 May 1990 – 20 July 1990
- Preceded by: Allan Roberts
- Succeeded by: Joe Benton
- Majority: 23,517 (66.3%)

Personal details
- Born: 27 May 1947 Bootle, Lancashire, England
- Died: 20 July 1990 (aged 43) Fazakerley, Merseyside, England
- Party: Labour

Michael Carr (27 May 1947 – 20 July 1990) was a British Labour Party politician who served as Member of Parliament for Bootle from May to July 1990. After being elected to parliament in a by-election, Carr died after only 57 days in office. He was a dockworker who later became a trade union official, but his political rise was assisted by the help he gave the Labour Party leadership in removing the influence of the Militant tendency.

Carr had served briefly as a local councillor and did not see his attempts to become an MP as a career move. His sudden death occurred after he had been sent home from hospital where staff failed to identify an imminent heart attack; prosecutions were considered and his family sought legal redress.

== Career ==
Carr, the son of a policeman, was born in his future constituency of Bootle. He went to St Mary's College in Crosby and found employment in the Netherlands and then Fareham where he met his wife Lyn; they married in 1970 and had four children. Carr moved back to Bootle the next year, where he worked as a wharfinger in the docks on the Mersey. In his 20s he travelled in the Middle-East.

== Labour politics ==
As a dockworker, Carr joined the Transport and General Workers Union which represented the industry, and became active in union affairs. He joined the Labour Party in 1976, and was elected as a Labour councillor on West Lancashire district council. He later moved to Kirkdale and was promoted to be a clerk working on the docks. He served on the North West Executive of the Labour Party from 1980. In this post he helped to remove the members of the Militant tendency from the Labour Party in Liverpool, which they had previously dominated, and was chairman of the temporary committee which replaced the Militant-dominated Liverpool District Labour Party in guiding the work of the Labour group on Liverpool City Council. He worked to ensure that the Labour Party in Liverpool was advocating non-Militant policies. He became Secretary of Liverpool Walton Constituency Labour Party in 1987. From 1984 Carr worked as a full-time union official, in the Garston office of the TGWU, where he specialised in looking after the interests of workers in small factories.

== Parliamentary candidate ==
Carr sought selection as the Labour candidate for Liverpool Walton when Eric Heffer announced his retirement in 1989, but lost to Peter Kilfoyle. In 1990 when Allan Roberts, the MP for Bootle, died of cancer, Carr was shortlisted for the candidacy along with Joe Benton, Mike Hall and Josie Farrington. On 25 April Carr was selected as Labour candidate for the constituency. He easily won the by-election to replace Roberts, on 24 May 1990; Carr subsequently told the press that the Labour Party had treated the constituency as a marginal and had not just campaigned on issues like the Poll Tax but also on bus deregulation, which had impacted people living on the outskirts of the town. He also said: "I don't see this as a job for life. I am not a career politician in the sense of following a career path with parliamentary ambitions."

== Parliamentary career ==
On 14 June 1990 Carr made his maiden speech in an Estimates day debate on training. He criticised the government's Youth Training Scheme, on which his children had been employed, as mostly "providing cheap labour to employers who are more interested in job substitution than the provision of decent training", and called for high quality training for all. He later questioned Sir Geoffrey Howe, then Leader of the House of Commons, asking for a proper method of induction for new Members of Parliament to be put in place ready for the next general election.

Carr was chosen to ask a question of Margaret Thatcher at Prime Minister's Questions on 17 July, asking her to take responsibility for the worsening economy. Dr Thomas Stuttaford, a former Conservative MP and medical correspondent of The Times, was watching from the gallery, and later remarked on his "extreme pallor". This can be seen here on C-SPAN's coverage of that PMQs. Carr's question to Thatcher begins at 11:50.

== Sudden death ==
On 20 July 1990, Carr attended a meeting of the General Management Committee of Liverpool Walton CLP in his role as Secretary. The meeting was extremely heated as followers of the Militant tendency were gearing up to increase their influence in the constituency party after the selection of Peter Kilfoyle to follow the retirement of Eric Heffer. Carr felt chest pains and went outside for some fresh air, but broke into a cold sweat and had to sit down. He complained of 'pins and needles' and his hands were numb. An ambulance was called and Carr was admitted to Walton Hospital at 9:54 pm.

To Carr's surprise, at the hospital he was told that his problem was hyperventilation, and at 10:25 pm he was discharged with a letter telling him to see his doctor, and sent home in a taxi. A quarter of an hour after arriving home he became ill again, and another ambulance was called. Carr had a heart attack and fell into a coma; efforts to revive him in the Accident and Emergency department of Walton Hospital were unsuccessful and he was pronounced dead at 11:50 pm.

== Aftermath ==
Following Carr's death another by-election for the seat had to be held in November of the year, and was won by the Labour candidate, Joe Benton.

The circumstances of Carr's death required an inquest and one was convened on 26 February 1991. When the full story emerged, the Merseyside coroner Roy Barter postponed the inquest to consider criminal charges for negligence against some of the health care personnel involved. The Director of Public Prosecutions decided that no charges should be brought and the inquest was resumed on 9 April 1992, when the coroner again postponed the hearing after referring three points of law to the High Court. Carr's family then successfully sought a judicial review of this decision which was held on 28 May 1993. A file was sent to the Director of Public Prosecutions, although insufficient evidence was found to prosecute. The judicial review nullified the proceedings at the first inquest, and ordered a new one under a different coroner. This second inquest opened on 20 February 1995. On 23 February 1995, a verdict of death by natural causes was recorded.

== See also ==
- List of United Kingdom MPs with the shortest service

Parliament of the United Kingdom
Preceded by Allan Roberts	Member of Parliament for Bootle; May 1990–July 1990	Succeeded by Joe Benton
