= Bootle =

Town in Merseyside, England

Coordinates: 53.4457°N 2.9891°W

- Town
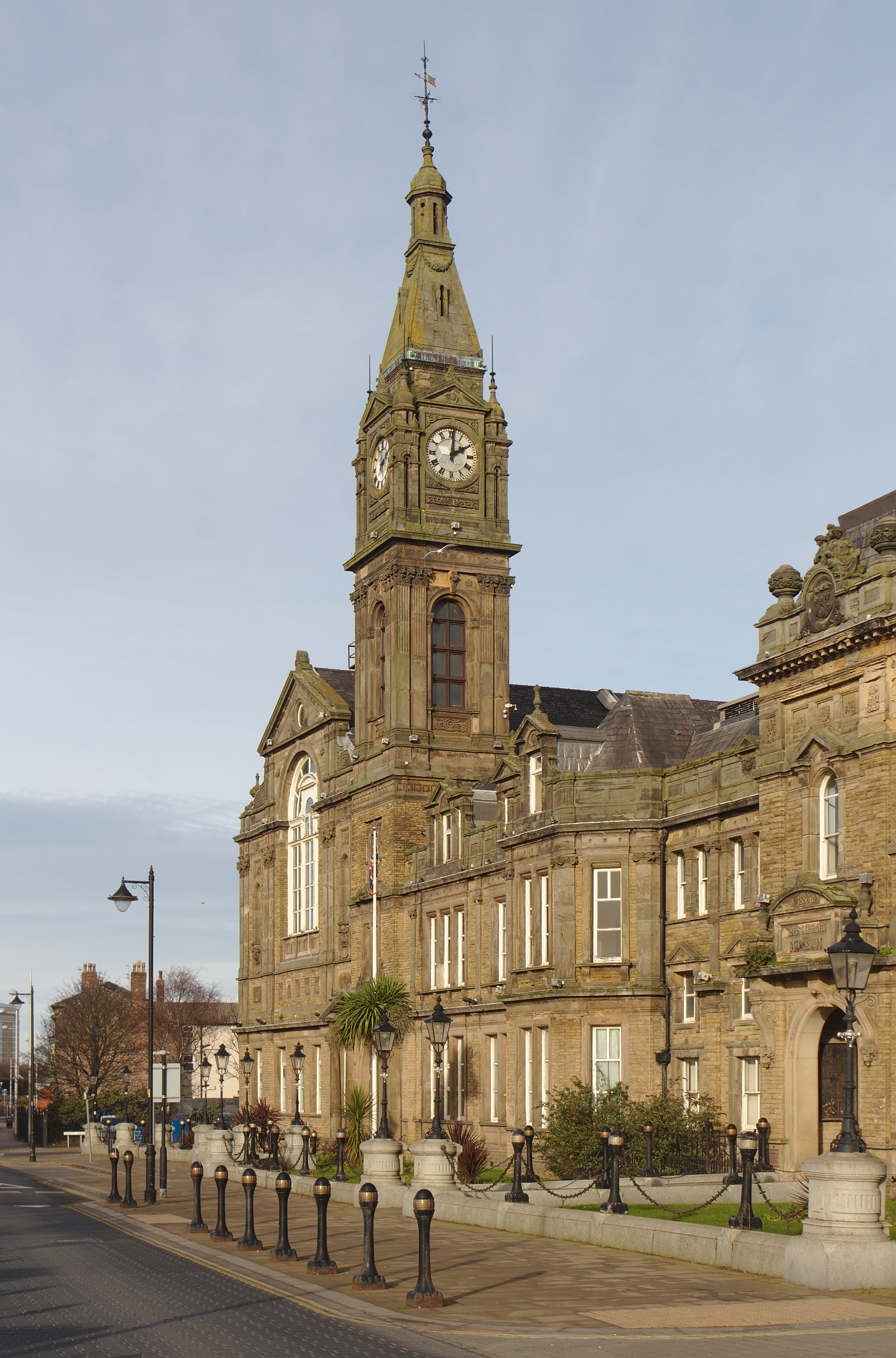
- Bootle Town Hall (2020)

- Location within Merseyside
- Population: 51,394 (2011)
- OS grid reference: SJ340944
  - London: 179.78 mi (289.33 km) SE
- Metropolitan borough: Sefton
- Metropolitan county: Merseyside
- Region: North West
- Country: England
- Sovereign state: United Kingdom
- Districts of the town: List: Aintree (Village); Ford; Kirkdale (Part); Litherland (Town); Netherton; Orrell; Orrell Park (Part); Seaforth; Waterloo
- Post town: Bootle
- Postcode district: L20, L30
- Dialling code: 0151
- Police: Merseyside
- Fire: Merseyside
- Ambulance: North West
- UK Parliament: Bootle
- Website: sefton.gov.uk

Bootle (pronounced /ˈbuːtəl/) is a town in the Metropolitan Borough of Sefton, Merseyside, England, which had a population of 51,394 in 2011. It is part of the Liverpool City Region.

Historically part of Lancashire, Bootle's proximity to the Irish Sea and the industrial city of Liverpool to the south saw it grow rapidly in the 1800s, first as a dormitory town for wealthy merchants, and then as a centre of commerce and industry in its own right following the arrival of the railway and the expansion of the docks and shipping industries. The subsequent population increase was fuelled heavily by Irish migration.

The town was heavily damaged in World War II with air raids against the port and other industrial targets. Post-war economic success in the 1950s and 1960s gave way to a downturn, precipitated by a reduction in the significance of Liverpool Docks internationally, and changing levels of industrialisation, coupled with the development of modern suburbs and the expansion of industries into the Merseyside hinterlands. By the 1980s, there had been a sharp spike in unemployment and population decline. Large-scale renewal projects have begun to help regenerate the local economy.

== History ==
=== Toponymy ===
Etymologically, Bootle derives from the Anglo Saxon bold or botle meaning a dwelling. It was recorded as Boltelai in the Domesday Book in 1086. By 1212 the spelling had been recorded as Botle. The spellings Botull, Bothull and Bothell are recorded in the 14th century. In the 18th century, it was known as Bootle cum Linacre.

=== Resort ===
Bootle was originally a small hamlet built near the 'sand hills' or dunes of the river estuary. In the early 19th century, it began to develop as a bathing resort, attracting wealthy people from Liverpool. Some remaining large villas which housed well-to-do commuters to Liverpool are located in the area known locally as 'Bootle Village', centred around the junction of Merton Road and Litherland Road.

=== Development ===
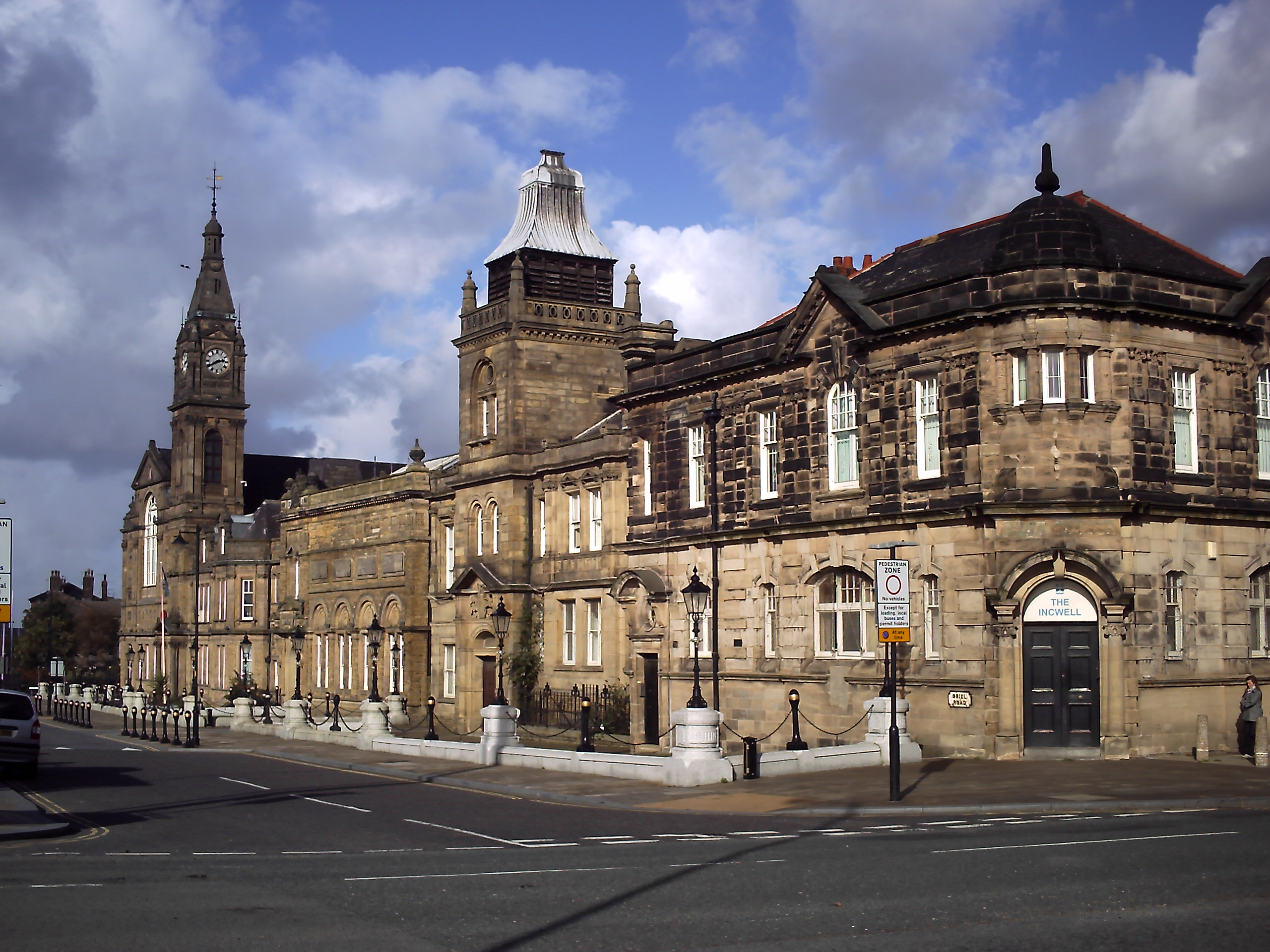
Bootle Town Hall

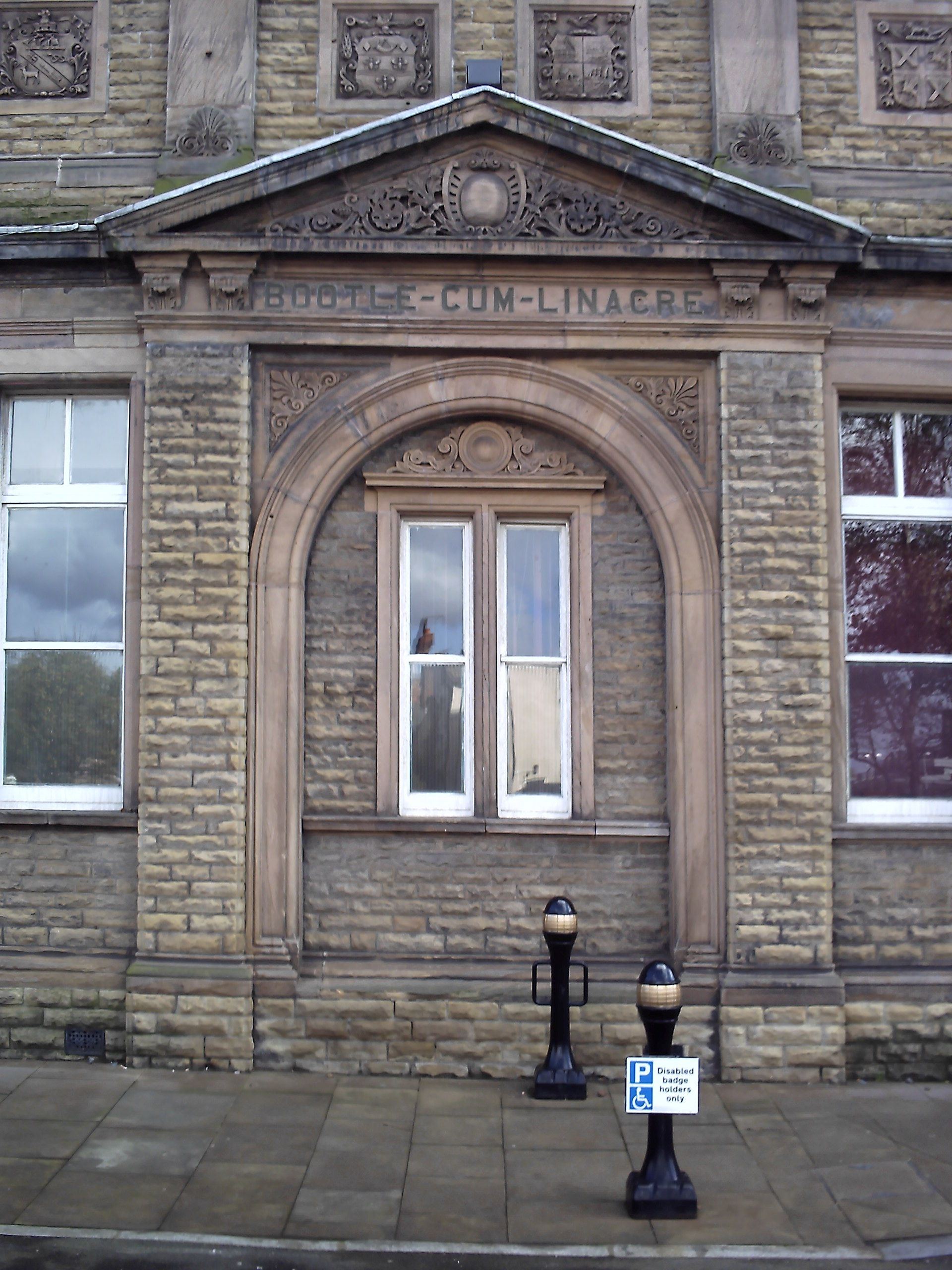
Bootle-cum-Linacre inscription on the town hall's external stonework

The Liverpool, Crosby and Southport Railway arrived in the 1840s and Bootle experienced rapid growth. By the end of the 19th century the docks had been constructed along the whole of the river front as far as Seaforth Sands to the north. The town became heavily industrialised. Fearful of annexation by Liverpool, Bootle was incorporated as a municipal borough in 1868 under the Municipal Corporations Act 1835, and in 1889 was granted the status of a county borough by the Local Government Act 1888, becoming independent from the administrative county of Lancashire. During this time period it was sometimes formally known as Bootle-cum-Linacre. Orrell was added to the borough in 1905. There are still large areas of Victorian terraced houses in Bootle, formerly occupied by dock workers. These are built in distinctive pressed red brick.

Bootle Town Hall and other municipal buildings were erected in the last quarter of the 19th century. The population of the town swelled during this period, boosted in large part by Irish immigration and the attraction of plentiful work on the docks. The wealth to pay for the splendour of the town hall and the gentrified 'Bootle Village' area was generated by these docks. The skilled workers lived in terraced houses in the east of the town, while the casual dock labourers lived in cramped, dwellings near the dockside. Stories about three streets in particular, Raleigh Street, Dundas Street and Lyons Street, caused great alarm. Lyons Street, the scene of the 'teapot murder', was renamed Beresford Street shortly before the First World War.

Bootle was the first borough to elect its own school board, following the passage of William Forster's Elementary Education Act 1870. In 1872 Dr R.J. Sprakeling was appointed the first Medical Officer of Health, and was instrumental in improving sanitary conditions in the town. The Metropole Theatre on Stanley Road played host to stars such as music hall singer Marie Lloyd. Tree lined streets surrounded magnificent open spaces, such as Derby Park, North Park and South Park. Roman Catholic and Anglican churches sprang up all over the town, and Welsh immigration brought with it Nonconformist chapels and the temperance movement. Local societies thrived, including sports teams, scouts and musical groups. The Bootle May Day carnival and the crowning of the May Queen were highlights of the social year. The town successfully fought against absorption by neighbouring Liverpool in 1903. It subsequently made good use of its Latin motto Respice, Aspice, Prospice ("look to the past, the present, the future").

=== Second World War ===
The docks made Bootle a target for Nazi German Luftwaffe bombers during the Liverpool Blitz of the Second World War, with approximately 90% of the houses in the town damaged. Situated immediately adjoining the city of Liverpool, and the site of numerous docks, Bootle had the distinction of being the most heavily bombed borough in the UK, with 458 civilian deaths from enemy action recorded within the borough. Bootle played an important role in the Battle of the Atlantic.

Royal Navy's Captain Frederic John Walker, the famous U-boat hunter, would rest in the mayor's parlour of Bootle Town Hall and his ships, HMS Stork and HMS Starling, sailed out of Gladstone Dock Bootle. Memorabilia associated with Walker including the ships's bell from HMS Starling which was presented to Bootle County Borough Council on 21 October 1964 by Admiral Sir Nigel Henderson Commander-in-Chief, Plymouth. can be viewed in Bootle Town Hall.

=== Post-war ===
After the Second World War large council housing estates were built inland from the town centre, including the area of Netherton, which was built on new town principles. The Liverpool Overhead Railway and Liverpool Corporation Tramways closure in the 1950s reduced Bootle's connection to Liverpool.

Bootle did share in the postwar boom. The centre of the town was redeveloped and the 'Bootle New Strand' shopping centre was opened in 1968. At the same time, new offices were built in the town centre. The town lost its access to the beach when neighbouring Seaforth Sands was redeveloped in the early 1970s, but the Seaforth Container Port brought new jobs into the area. The local authority, and other social landlords, saw to it that new housing was built and older stock renovated. Bootle did not go down the route of massive housing clearance, and many local communities remained intact.

The borough celebrated its centenary in 1968 and civic pride was much in evidence.

=== Decline ===
The docks declined in importance in the 1960s and 1970s, and Bootle suffered high unemployment and a declining population. The establishment of large office blocks housing government departments and the National Girobank provided employment, filled largely by middle-class people from outside the Bootle and Liverpool area. In the early 1970s Bootle was absorbed into the new local authority of Sefton under local government reorganisation. More fundamental than political change was economic change. The very reason for Bootle's existence, the access to the Mersey, became almost irrelevant as the docks closed and the new container port required far fewer workers than the old docks had. This in turn affected practically every other industry in the town. The problems slowly gathered pace until Merseyside hit crisis point in the early 1980s. Even by 2006 the area was one of the poorest in the country and had high levels of unemployment.

=== Regeneration ===
Asda heavily invested in Bootle by building a new eco-friendly superstore on Strand Road in 2008. Among refurbishment and rebuilding projects in the 2010s, the HSE buildings and the new-look Stanley Road have been created, Oriel Road Station has been refurbished, and a new block of flats on the site of the Stella Maris building and a Lidl store on Stanley Road have been built. The Klondyke Estate located off Hawthorne road saw the Welsh terrace houses get demolished and replaced with two-, three-, and four-bed modern houses. This was after the controversial move by Bellway after residents opposed demolition. In 2023, Sefton Council successfully bid to the government's Levelling Up Fund for £20 million to underpin a regeneration scheme to transform Bootle town centre.

In November 2016, Liverpool2 was opened, expanding Seaforth Docks with river berths that can accommodate large container ships.

=== Unemployment ===
The economic recovery on Merseyside since the 1980s has meant that Bootle is ranked as only the tenth worst area for unemployment in Britain, and all other parts of the region have lower unemployment—a stark contrast to the 1970s and 1980s when areas of Merseyside dominated the list of Britain's least economically active areas. As of 2009, in the depth of a recession, unemployment stood at 12%. In 2022, it was reduced to less than 4%, similar to the national average.

== Geography and administration ==
Bootle Docks was created as a part of the Mersey Docks and now promoted as Port of Liverpool, with the Liverpool and Wirral Docks, being located on both bank sides of the River Mersey. Bootle Docks are situated at the northern end, that is closer to the Irish Sea estuary.

Bootle, along with Southport, is one of the two main administrative headquarters for the Metropolitan Borough of Sefton. Among Bootle's neighbouring districts are Kirkdale to the south, Walton to the east, with Seaforth, Litherland and Netherton to the north. To the west it is bounded by the River Mersey. In the centre is a sizeable area of large office blocks, and the Leeds and Liverpool Canal.

The old civic centre of Bootle contains large Victorian buildings such as the town hall and the municipal baths. To the north lies the New Strand Shopping Centre, which gained notoriety after the abduction and murder of two-year-old James Bulger in 1993.

== Sport and Leisure ==
Bootle has one association football non-league team known as Bootle F.C. who currently play in the Northern Premier League Division One West. They are a reformed version of the original Bootle F.C. (1879).

Bootle Cricket Club was founded in 1933 and they incorporated Firwood into the club's name in the 1990s. Their main ground is on Wadham Road. Firwood Bootle CC has a significant success record, with 6 Liverpool and District Cricket Competition championship titles to their name. Bootle field three senior teams that compete in the Liverpool and District Cricket Competition and they have an established junior training section that play competitive cricket in the Liverpool Competition Junior League.

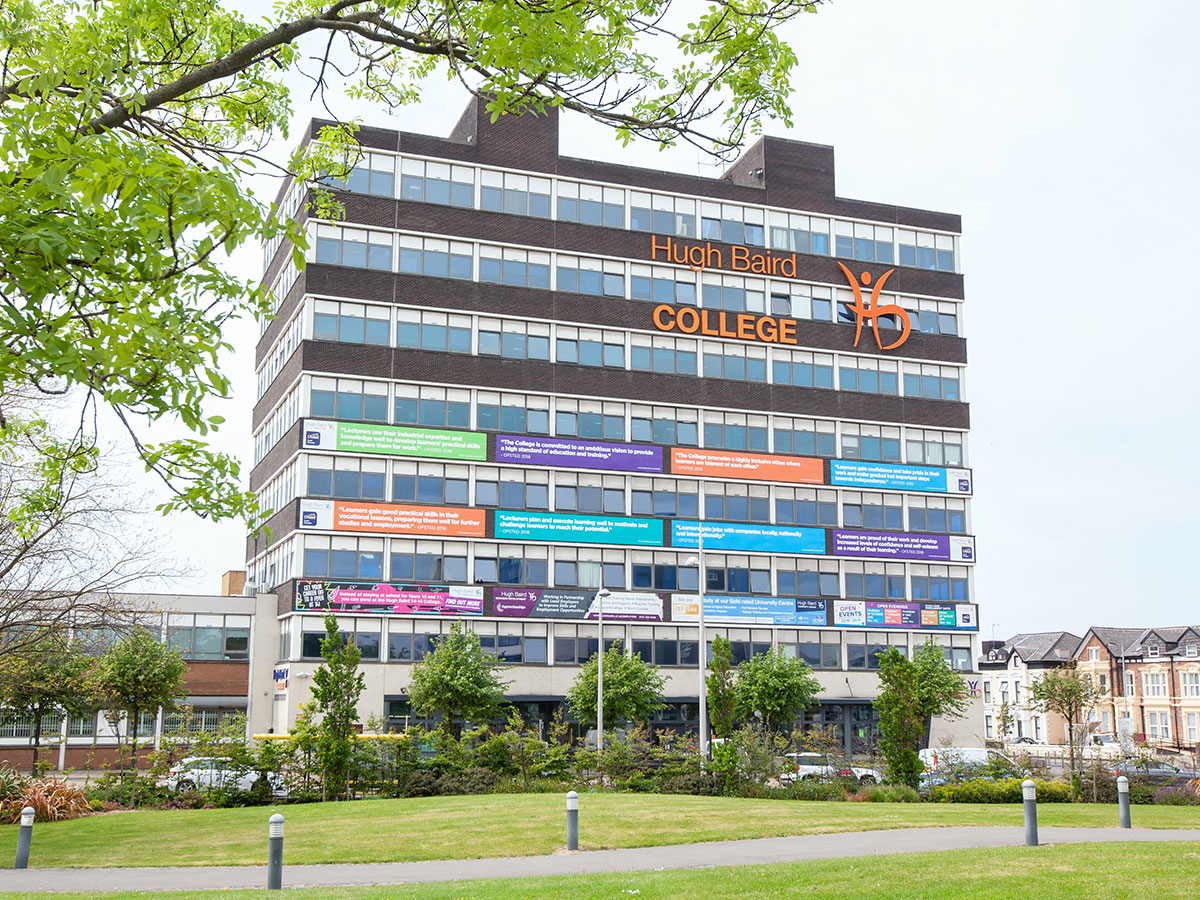
Hugh Baird College (2020)

== Education ==
The town has one further education college, Hugh Baird College, located on Balliol Road. The college delivers over 300 courses to more than 7,000 students with course levels from entry level to Level 3, A-levels, apprenticeships and university level courses and degrees.

In January 2014, a multimillion-pound facility called the L20 Building located on Stanley Road was opened. This houses a dedicated university centre with open-plan study areas for students studying university-level courses.

== Transport ==
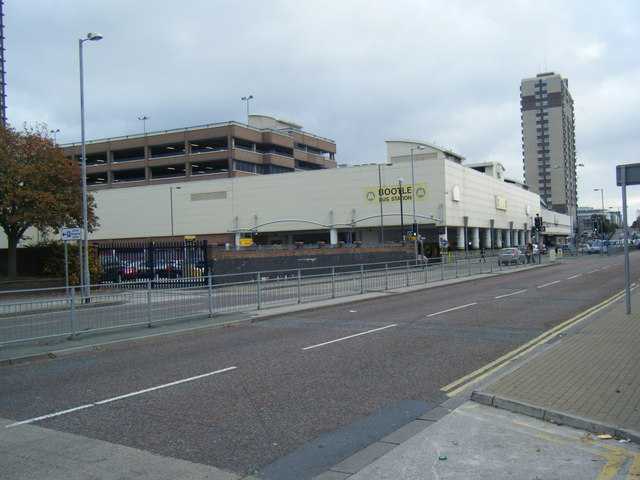
Bootle bus station

There are two railway stations served by frequent electric services from Liverpool to Southport. These are Oriel Road near the Victorian era civic centre, and New Strand, serving the shopping centre. A third railway station is situated on the boundary of Bootle (Old Roan), and is part of the Liverpool to Ormskirk Line. A goods line, the Canada Dock Branch (sometimes known as the Bootle Branch), is still in use. Passenger services on the line ended during the 1960s, formerly serving Bootle Balliol Road railway station and the areas of Clubmoor, Tuebrook and Childwall among other places. A second route, the North Mersey Branch could still be opened.

The bus station is under the New Strand Shopping Centre and provides services to Liverpool city centre, Penny Lane, Allerton, Tuebrook and Crosby.

Bootle Docks used to host passenger ships to Belfast and Dublin, but now it is used solely for freight services, and it is somewhat less important than the port of Liverpool.

== Amenities ==
The town has a leisure centre, located in the North Park area, which includes a modern gym, swimming pool, and various indoor sports halls. The Bootle New Strand shopping centre contains many of the regular high street stores, combined with a smaller collection of local businesses. For entertainment there is a wide variety of pubs, snooker clubs and late-night bars. There are also a number of restaurants.

== Politics ==
Originally a Conservative seat, Bootle elected early MPs such as Bonar Law, a future Tory prime minister. The seat was briefly Liberal in the early 1920s. Labour first captured the seat in 1929, in the personage of local hairdresser John Kinley, but lost it in 1931. Although Kinley recaptured it in 1945 it did not become safely Labour until the long tenure of Simon Mahon. It is now impregnable, politically, and since 1997 the Bootle constituency has been one of the safest Labour Party seats in the whole of the United Kingdom. The area was represented in parliament by Joe Benton until he stood down in 2015. The current MP is Peter Dowd.

For elections to Sefton Council the town of Bootle is split between the electoral wards of Netherton and Orrell, whose three representatives, are all members of the Labour Party, and are Susan Ellen Bradshaw, Ian Ralph Maher and Tom Spring. Derby, whose three representatives are Brenda O'Brien, David Robinson and Anne Thompson and are all members of the Labour Party, and finally Linacre whose three representatives, are all members of the Labour Party, and are John Fairclough, Christine Maher, and Daniel McKee. Overall there are nine councillors representing the Bootle area, all of them are members of the Labour Party. Overall the electoral wards of Sefton Council in and around Bootle and the parliamentary constituency itself are extremely safe seats for the Labour Party, sometimes standing uncontested by the other parties.

== Notable people ==
Many notable footballers were born in Bootle. Jamie Carragher, Steve McManaman and Roy Evans came to prominence playing for Liverpool (with Evans later going on to become the club's manager) whilst Alvin Martin is regarded as one of West Ham United's greatest-ever players. Former Evertonian Jose Baxter of Sheffield United was also born in Bootle. England Lioness and Manchester City player Alex Greenwood grew up playing on the streets of Bootle.

In the arts, Bootle has produced the comedian Tom O'Connor, the television presenter Keith Chegwin, television producer and presenter Will Hanrahan and early rock and roll singer Billy J. Kramer. The fashion retailer George Davies was educated in Bootle.

John C. Wells, linguist, was born in Bootle.

Derek Acorah, psychic medium, was born in Bootle.

Paul Nuttall, former leader of the UK Independence Party, was born in Bootle.

Sergiusz Pinkwart, writer, journalist, traveler and Magellan Award winner, lives in Bootle.

Pat Kelly, New Zealand trade unionist, was born and raised in Bootle.

== Mayors ==
- Charles Howson, 1869
- Thomas P. Danson, 1870
- William Geves, 1870–1874
- George Barnes, 1874
- Thomas P. Danson, 1875–76
- Louis W. Heintz, 1877 (Conservative)
- J. Newell, 1878 (Conservative)
- John P. McArthur, 1879 (Conservative)
- James Webster, 1882 (Liberal)
- James Webster (Liberal, re-elected in November 1883, supported by both Liberals and Conservatives)
- James Leslie, 1884 (Liberal)
- Matthew Hill, 1885 (Liberal)
- William Jones, 1886 ("Klondike Bill")
- John Wells, 1888
- Benjamin Cain, 1889 (Liberal)
- John Vicars, 1890–91
- William Thomas, 1892
- Benjamin Sands Johnson, 1893–94
- Isac Alexander Mack, 1895–96 (Liberal)
- John McMurray, 1897
- William Robert Brewster, 1898 (Conservative)
- George Lamb, 1899 (Liberal)
- Peter Ascroft JP, 1900 (Conservative but elected with unanimous cross-party support)
- George Samuel Wild, 1901
- William Henry Clemmey, 1902 (Conservative)
- James Julius Metcalf, 1903
- Owen Kendrick Jones, 1904 (son of William Jones, Mayor, 1886)
- Robert Edward Roberts, 1905
- Alfred Rutherford, 1906
- James Person, 1907
- George Randall, 1908
- Hugh Carruthers, 1909
- James Roger Barbour, 1910
- John William Edwin Smith, 1911
- William Henry Clemmey, 1912 (Conservative)
- John Rafter, 1913
- George Alexander Cassady, 1914
- James Pearson, 1915
- Benjamin Edward Bailey, 1916
- James Pearson, 1917
- Harry Pennington, 1918–19
- John Henry Johnston, 1920–21
- Thomas Alfred Patrick, 1922
- Robert Turner, 1923
- Birty Wolfenden, 1924
- Thomas Harris, 1925
- Frederick William King, 1926
- Edmund Gardner, 1927–28
- Simon Mahon, 1929, first Catholic Mayor of Bootle, father of MPs Peter and Simon Mahon
- Donald Samuel Eaton, 1930
- Arthur Hankey, 1931
- James Scott, 1932
- Maurice Stanley Webster, 1933
- Edwin Smith, 1934
- John William Clark, 1935
- James Burnie, 1936
- James O'Neill, 1937
- Nicholas Cullen, 1938 (Labour)
- James Spence, 1939
- Joseph Sylvester Kelly, 1940 (Labour)
- James Stubbs Riley, 1941
- Richard Owen Jones, 1942
- George Alfred Rogers, 1943
- William Keenan, 1944 (Labour)
- John Thomas Hackett, 1945
- Harry Oswald Cullen, 1946
- Thomas Harris, 1947–48
- Charles G Anderson, 1949 (Conservative)
- David Berger Black, 1950 (Conservative)
- Robert James Rogerson, 1951 (Conservative)
- Mark Connolly, 1952 (Labour)
- Robert J Rainford, 1953 (Conservative)
- Peter Mahon (politician), 1954 (Labour)
- Thomas A Cain JP, 1955 (Labour)
- Dr Israel Harris JP, 1956 (Labour)
- Albert Sidney Moore JP, 1957 (Labour)
- John Cyril Hevey, 1958 (Labour)
- Hugh Baird, 1959 (Labour)
- Joseph Samuel Kelly, 1960 (Labour)
- Joseph Sylvester Kelly, 1961 (Labour)
- Simon Mahon Jr., 1962 (Labour)
- John Morley, 1963 (Labour)
- Thomas E Dooley, 1964 (Labour)
- Griff Williams, 1965 (Labour)
- James Grimley, 1966 (Labour)
- Veronica Bray, 1967 (Labour)
- Oliver Ellis, 1968 (Conservative)
- Harold Gee, 1969 (Conservative)
- Fred Morris, 1970 (Conservative)
- George Halliwell, 1971 (Conservative)
- John Marray, 1972 (Labour)
- William A Wiseman, 1973 (Labour)

== See also ==
- Listed buildings in Bootle
