= Eric Errington =

British barrister and Conservative Party politician

Sir Eric Errington, 1st Baronet
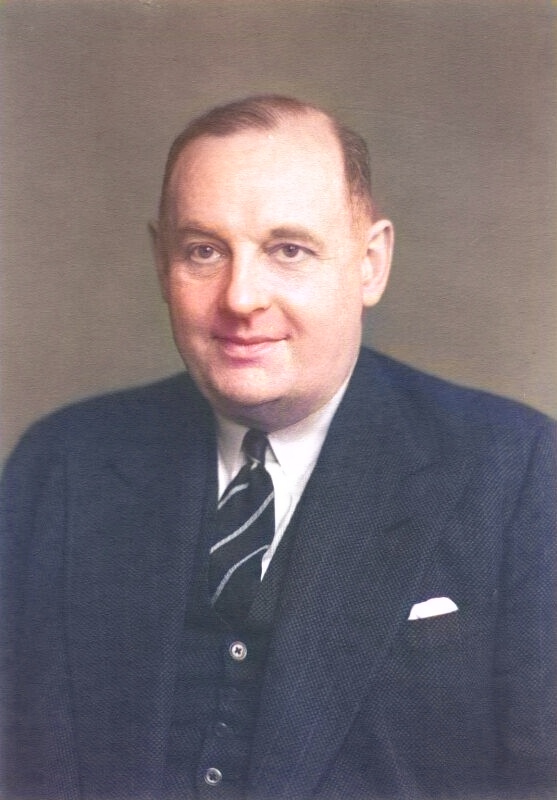

Member of Parliament for Aldershot
- In office 28 October 1954 – 29 May 1970
- Preceded by: Oliver Lyttelton
- Succeeded by: Julian Critchley

Personal details
- Born: 17 March 1900 Glasgow, Scotland
- Died: 3 June 1973 (aged 73) Anglesey, Wales
- Party: Conservative

Sir Eric Errington, 1st Baronet (17 March 1900 – 3 June 1973) was a British barrister and Conservative Party politician. He was a Member of Parliament (MP) from 1935 to 1945, and from 1954 to 1970.

== Early life ==
Sir Eric Errington was born on 17 March 1900 in Glasgow, Scotland, son of Frederick Smith, and was educated at Mill Hill School, Liverpool College and Trinity College, Oxford University. During the First World War he served in the Gordon Highlanders in 1918. He was called to the Bar by the Inner Temple in 1923.

== Politics ==
In the 1929 general election, Errington was an unsuccessful candidate in Hanley for the Conservative Party. He fought Liverpool Scotland in the 1931 general election, becoming one of the few Conservative candidates to be defeated in the election. He was elected to Liverpool City Council for the Aigburth in 1934.

Having served his 'apprenticeship' in unfavourable seats, Errington had an opportunity in a winnable seat in the 1935 general election. He managed to win Bootle, and sat in Parliament for ten years. During the Second World War he enlisted in the Royal Air Force and served from 1939 to 1945. In the Labour landslide 1945 general election, however, Errington lost his seat.

Out of Parliament Errington remained involved in Conservative politics and was made Chairman of the North Western Area of the National Union in 1946 (a position he held until 1951). In 1948 he became a Justice of the Peace in Liverpool, an appointment facilitated by political party membership. In 1952 he became chairman of the executive committee of the National Union of Conservative and Unionist Associations. He was knighted in the 1952 Queen's Birthday Honours List.

Abandoning Liverpool, Errington became MP for Aldershot in Hampshire in an October 1954 byelection. He held the safe seat until he retired in 1970. He was involved in business and was President of the National Federation of Property Owners from 1956 to 1959, and of the Hire Purchase Trade Association in 1965. From 1961, Errington's seniority in Parliament brought him the Chairmanship of the Estimates Sub-Committee on Home Affairs. He was also President of the Wessex Provincial Area of the National Union from 1962 to 1965. In 1963 he was made a baronet. He died on Anglesey aged 73.

== Personal life ==
Sir Eric Errington married Marjorie Bennett, the daughter of Aida Grant Bennett, on 12 September 1924. They had three children together with the eldest, Geoffrey Fredrick Errington inheriting the Baronetcy in 1973 after his death. Lady Errington died five months and twenty days after the death of her husband.

Coat of arms of Eric Errington

Crest
A liver bird supporting with the dexter claw an oak sapling Proper.
Escutcheon
Or an open book clasped on a chief Azure a spur rowel upwards between two portcullises chained Or.
Motto
Petit Ardua Virtus

Parliament of the United Kingdom
Preceded by Chichester Crookshank	Member of Parliament for Bootle; 1935–1945	Succeeded by Jack Kinley
Preceded by Oliver Lyttelton	Member of Parliament for Aldershot; 1954–1970	Succeeded by Julian Critchley
Baronetage of the United Kingdom
New creation	Baronet (of Ness); 1963–1973	Succeeded by Geoffrey Errington
