= Simon Mahon =

British politician

Simon Mahon MP

Member of Parliament for Bootle
- In office 1955–1979
- Preceded by: John Kinley
- Succeeded by: Allan Roberts

Personal details
- Born: 4 April 1914 Bootle, Lancashire, England
- Died: October 19, 1986 (aged 72) Crosby, Merseyside, England
- Party: Labour
- Spouse: Veronica Robertshaw
- Relations: Peter Mahon (brother) Peter Dowd (great-nephew)

Simon Mahon (4 April 1914 – 19 October 1986) was a British Labour Party politician.

== Biography ==
Simon Mahon was born into a prominent Roman Catholic family of Irish descent in Bootle. His father, Alderman Simon Mahon (1886–1961), was a mayor of Bootle who ran for Liverpool Exchange MP in 1935. His brother, Peter, was elected MP for Preston South in 1964. His great-nephew, Peter Dowd, has been the Labour MP for the Bootle constituency since 2015, and served in the Shadow Cabinet under Jeremy Corbyn until 2020.

Mahon was educated at St Joseph's Irish Christian Brothers school and at St James' School, Bootle. He became a general contractor. Mahon was a councillor and later an alderman of Bootle Borough Council and was chairman of the housing committee and Mayor of Bootle from 1962 to 1963. He was chairman of Bootle Trades Council and Labour Party. Mahon was Member of Parliament for Bootle from 1955 to 1979. He served as an opposition whip from 1959 to 1961. In 1968, Mahon and his brother, Peter, together with another Catholic Labour MP, Walter Alldritt, threatened to resign the Whip. They had taken exception to remarks made by Douglas Houghton, Chairman of the Parliamentary Labour Party, that large families were a form of "social irresponsibility". Only a midnight meeting with Prime Minister Harold Wilson and a written statement that Houghton's views were not party policy reportedly dissuaded the MPs from carrying out their threat. In 1969, Mahon was created a Papal Knight.

== Personal life ==
Mahon married Veronica Robertshaw in 1941; the couple had no children. After his retirement, Mahon moved to live in Crosby, where he died in 1986, aged 72.

== Sources ==
- Times Guide to the House of Commons October 1974
- Leigh Rayment's Historical List of MPs

Parliament of the United Kingdom
| Preceded by Jack Kinley | Member of Parliament for Bootle; 1955–1979 | Succeeded by Allan Roberts |
