= Allan Roberts (politician) =

British politician (1943–1990)

Member of Parliament for Bootle
- In office 3 May 1979 – 21 March 1990
- Preceded by: Simon Mahon
- Succeeded by: Michael Carr

Personal details
- Born: 28 October 1943 Droylsden, Lancashire England
- Died: 21 March 1990 (aged 46)
- Party: Labour

Allan Roberts (28 October 1943 – 21 March 1990) was a British Labour Party politician who served as the Member of Parliament (MP) for Bootle from 1979 to 1990. A teacher and social worker before his election, he was a member the party's left.

== Early life ==
Roberts was from a working-class background, the son of a baker and a machinist. He was born in Droylsden on the eastern side of Manchester, and went to Littlemoss Boys' County Secondary School. He first trained as a teacher at Ashton-under-Lyne College of Education and Didsbury College of Education.

He joined the Labour Party while still a teenager in 1959, and the next year also joined the Campaign for Nuclear Disarmament. He unsuccessfully fought the Hazel Grove constituency in the February and October 1974 elections.

== Selection ==
In May 1978, Roberts was a surprising choice to replace Simon Mahon who was retiring as Member of Parliament for Bootle, a constituency in which he had no local roots. Mahon and Roberts were almost polar opposites: Mahon was born in Bootle, a conservative Roman Catholic with traditional views on morality, while Roberts was from Manchester, a member of the New Left.

His experience with council housing issues was a considerable asset in winning selection, and he made a speech to the Labour Party conference in 1978 arguing that public authorities needed a surplus of council housing in order to solve the housing crisis.

== Labour politics ==
As a supporter of Tony Benn in the Deputy Leadership election of 1981, Roberts was unopposed for reselection that June. He opposed the Falklands War, and joined the Socialist Campaign Group in December 1982. The Militant tendency was active in his constituency, which neighboured the group's Walton base in Liverpool, and Roberts described the national Labour Party's attempts to expel members of Militant as a "witch hunt". Following the 1983 election (in which he was re-elected with a 15,139 majority), Roberts nominated his constituency neighbour Eric Heffer for the Labour leadership and Michael Meacher for the Deputy Leadership.

Seeking to make a political point, Roberts brought forward a Bill to give private tenants the right to buy their flats in November 1983. Roberts had made enough of a name for himself to become a columnist in the Labour Herald (a newspaper set up by the Labour left, including Ken Livingstone) in 1983. He was also noticed in Parliament for his habit of dressing casually, and was rumoured to be the first MP to wear jeans to work. In November 1984, he won a libel action against the News of the World, which had linked him to gay sex offences in Liverpool, where he was 'flogged naked in a dungeon in Berlin'.

== Death ==
Roberts was diagnosed with cancer in the late 1980s and after a long period suffering from the disease, died at the age of 46. He was the first of three MPs for Bootle in the year 1990, as his successor Michael Carr died only a month after retaining the seat in the May 1990 by-election. Carr was succeeded by Joe Benton, who was elected MP in the November 1990 by-election.

Parliament of the United Kingdom
Preceded by Simon Mahon	Member of Parliament for Bootle; 1979–1990	Succeeded by Michael Carr
