= 1911 Bootle by-election =

UK parliamentary by-election

← Dec. 1910	27 March 1911	1918 →

Candidate	Bonar Law	Muspratt
Party	Conservative	Liberal
Popular vote	9,976	7,782
Percentage	56.2%	43.8%
MP before election
Thomas Sandys
Conservative
Subsequent MP
Thomas Royden
Unionist

The 1911 Bootle by-election was a by-election held for the British House of Commons constituency of Bootle in Merseyside on 27 March 1911. It was won by the Conservative Party candidate Bonar Law.

== Vacancy ==
The seat had become vacant on 13 March 1911 when the sitting Conservative Member of Parliament (MP), 73-year-old Thomas Myles Sandys had resigned from the House of Commons by the procedural device of accepting the office of Steward of the Manor of Northstead, a notional 'office of profit under the crown'. He had held the seat since the 1885 general election, and died on 18 October 1911.

== Previous result ==
At the previous December 1910 general election, Conservative MP Thomas Sandys was elected unopposed. However, there was a previous contest at the General election in January:

General election January 1910: Bootle
Party	Candidate	Votes	%	±%
Conservative	Thomas Sandys	9,954	52.9	+1.8
Liberal	W Permewan	8,869	47.1	−1.8
Majority		1,085	5.8	+3.6
Turnout		18,823	78.7	+4.9
Conservative hold		Swing		

== Result ==
Bootle by-election, 1911
Party	Candidate	Votes	%	±%
Conservative	Bonar Law	9,976	56.2	N/A
Liberal	Max Muspratt	7,782	43.8	New
Majority		2,194	12.4	N/A
Turnout		17,758	69.7	N/A
Conservative hold		Swing		

The result was a victory for the Conservative candidate, Bonar Law, who won the seat with 56% of the votes. He did not contest Bootle in 1918, and was instead elected in the Glasgow Central constituency.

Bonar Law was later elected Leader of the Conservative Party in the House of Commons, and went on to hold a series of ministerial positions before becoming Prime Minister for seven months from 1922 to 1923

== See also ==
- Bootle (UK Parliament constituency)
- List of United Kingdom by-elections
