= Peter Dowd =

British Labour politician, MP for Bootle

Peter Dowd MP
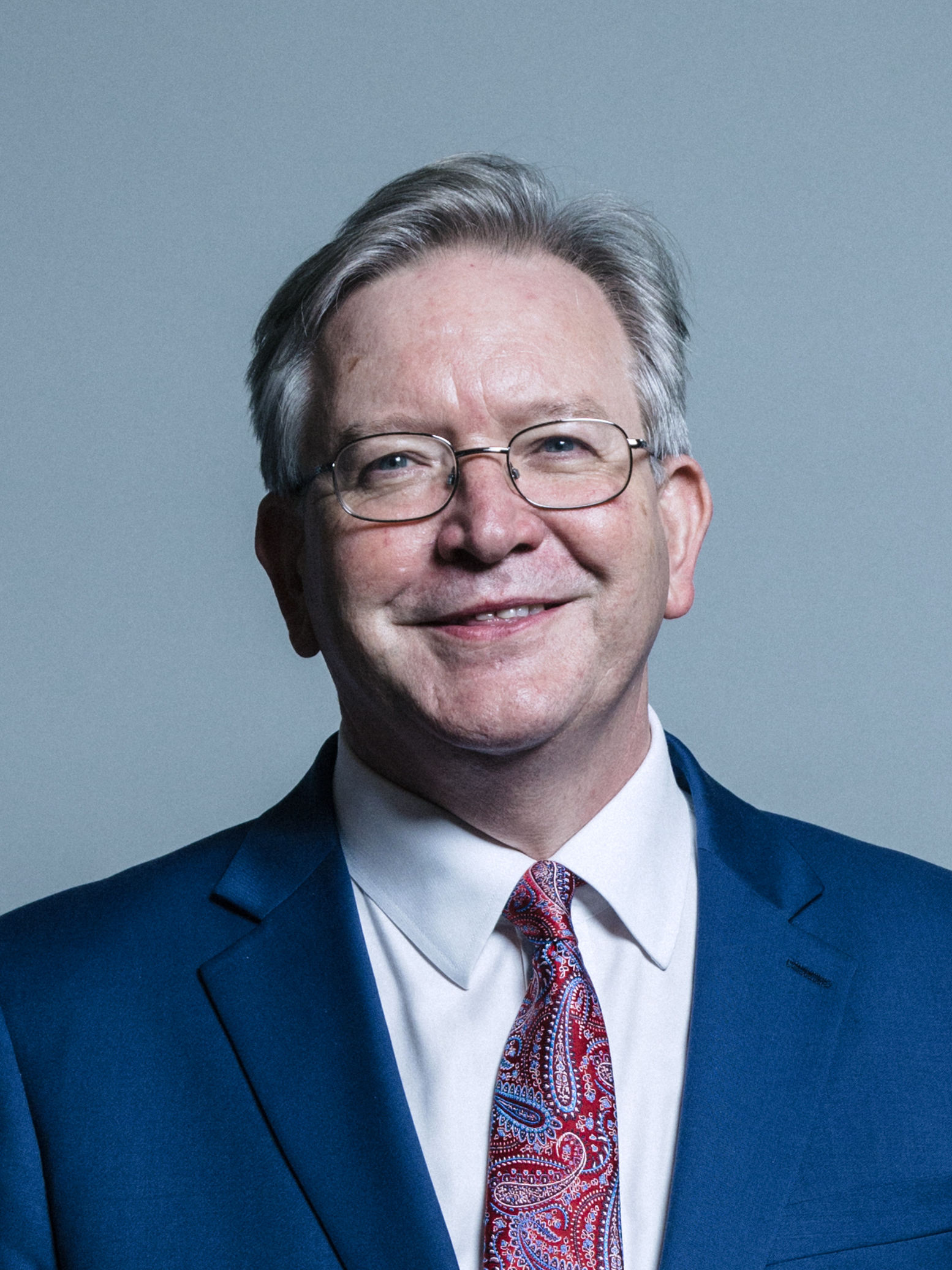
- Official portrait, 2017

Shadow Chief Secretary to the Treasury
- In office 9 February 2017 – 6 April 2020
- Leader: Jeremy Corbyn
- Preceded by: Rebecca Long-Bailey
- Succeeded by: Bridget Phillipson

Shadow Financial Secretary to the Treasury
- In office 6 October 2016 – 9 February 2017
- Leader: Jeremy Corbyn
- Preceded by: Rob Marris
- Succeeded by: Anneliese Dodds

Member of Parliament for Bootle
- Incumbent
- Assumed office 7 May 2015
- Preceded by: Joe Benton
- Majority: 21,983 (56.5%)

Personal details
- Born: Peter Christopher Dowd; 20 June 1957 (age 69) Bootle, Lancashire, England
- Party: Labour
- Relations: Peter Mahon (great uncle) Simon Mahon (great uncle)
- Education: Hugh Baird College; University of Liverpool; Lancaster University
- Website: peterdowd.com

Peter Christopher Dowd (born 20 June 1957) is a British Labour Party politician who has been the Member of Parliament (MP) for Bootle since 2015. From 2017 to 2020, he served as the Shadow Chief Secretary to the Treasury.

== Early life and education ==
Peter Dowd was born on 20 June 1957 in Bootle in a large working-class family with a long history of activism in the Labour Party. His great-uncles, Simon and Peter Mahon, served as Labour MPs. Dowd went to local primary and secondary schools and college, before earning an undergraduate degree from Liverpool University, and then a postgraduate degree from Lancaster University.

== Political career ==
Dowd was a Merseyside County Councillor from 1981 to 1986 for the Hawthorne ward. He became a Sefton Borough councillor in 1991 when he replaced Joe Benton for the Derby ward.

He was a councillor for Derby from 1991 to 2003, before he moved to St Oswalds ward (covering Netherton and Marian Square). He was also chair of Merseyside Fire Authority in the 1990s. Dowd was elected Sefton Labour group leader after the death of Dave Martin, and was leader until 2015. He was consequently elected Leader of Sefton Council from 2011 to 2015.

== Parliamentary career ==
At the 2015 general election, Dowd was elected to Parliament as MP for Bootle with 74.5% of the vote and a majority of 28,704.

Dowd was one of 48 Labour MPs to vote against the second reading of the Conservative government's Welfare Reform and Work Bill, which included £12 billion in welfare cuts, on 20 July 2015. In doing so they defied the party's leadership, which had ordered MPs to abstain.

In February 2017, Jeremy Corbyn, the leader of the Labour Party, appointed him to the position of Shadow Chief Secretary to the Treasury.

Dowd was re-elected as MP for Bootle at the snap 2017 general election with an increased vote share of 84% and an increased majority of 36,200. He was again re-elected at the 2019 general election, with a decreased vote share of 79.4% and a decreased majority of 34,556. He was again re-elected at the 2024 general election with a decreased vote share of 68.7% and a decreased majority of 21,983.

In November 2024, Dowd voted in favour of the Terminally Ill Adults (End of Life) Bill, which proposes to legalise assisted suicide.

== Personal life ==
On 6 October 2020, Dowd's daughter, Jennie, died at the age of 31 following a cycling collision. The driver was sentenced to 12 months in prison.

Parliament of the United Kingdom
Preceded by Joe Benton	Member of Parliament for Bootle; 2015–present	Incumbent
Political offices
Preceded by Rebecca Long-Bailey	Shadow Chief Secretary to the Treasury; 2017–2020	Succeeded by Bridget Phillipson
