= Joe Benton =

British politician (born 1933)

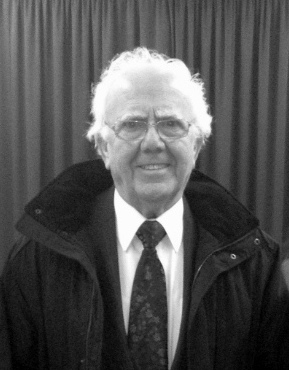
- Benton in 2012

Member of Parliament for Bootle
- In office 8 November 1990 – 30 March 2015
- Preceded by: Michael Carr
- Succeeded by: Peter Dowd

Personal details
- Born: Joseph Edward Benton; 28 September 1933 (age 93) Bootle, Lancashire, England
- Party: Labour
- Spouse: Doris Wynne

Joseph Edward Benton (born 28 September 1933) is a British Labour Party politician who was the Member of Parliament (MP) for Bootle from 1990 to 2015.

== Early life ==
Benton was born in Bootle, Merseyside and was educated at the St Monica's Roman Catholic Primary School on Aintree Road and Secondary School in Bootle and the Bootle Municipal Technical College (now part of the Hugh Baird College of Further Education).

On leaving school in 1949 he received an apprenticeship as a fitter and turner. He entered National Service in 1955 with the RAF. In 1958 he joined the Pacific Steam Navigation Company as a personnel officer, remaining in this position until 1981. In 1982 he became a personnel manager with Girobank.

He has been a Justice of the Peace on the Bootle Bench since 1969. He was elected to serve as a councillor on Bootle County Borough council in 1970, moving to Sefton Borough Council after local government reform in 1973 and serving until his election to Parliament in 1990. Benton was member for the Derby ward from 1970 to 1991 and Leader of the Council from 1987 to 1990. Peter Dowd succeeded Benton as MP for the Bootle constituency in May 2015.

== Parliamentary career ==
Bootle saw the death of two young Labour MPs in 1990. Allan Roberts died on 21 March after a long battle with cancer; Benton was on the shortlist to follow him but lost out to Mike Carr who won the by-election on 24 May. Carr died on 20 July as a result of a heart attack just 57 days after his election. Benton won the selection to fight the second by-election in Bootle. He was elected comfortably on 8 November, obtaining 78% of the vote and nearly ten times that of his nearest rival, the Conservative James Clappison. Following the 2001 general election, he held the safest Labour seat in the country.

Benton was appointed as an opposition whip by John Smith in 1994, but was not given a government post by Tony Blair after the 1997 general election.

Benton voted to restrict the availability of abortion, and opposes embryo research and euthanasia. He was also one of fifteen Labour MPs to oppose the Sexual Offences (Amendment) Bill which equalised the age of consent for homosexual and heterosexual sex, and he was one of only three Labour MPs (along with David Crausby and Stephen Hepburn) to vote against repealing Section 28. In February 2012, Benton signed a petition sponsored by the Coalition for Marriage which states "I support the legal definition of marriage which is the voluntary union for life of one man and one woman to the exclusion of all others. I oppose any attempt to redefine it." This aroused opposition in his constituency party, with some members feeling he was not prepared to listen to them, contributing towards a move to deselect him.

In February 2013, Benton voted against the second reading of the Marriage (Same Sex Couples) Act 2013. Subsequently, in May 2013, he voted against the bill’s third and final reading, thereby opposing the legalisation of same-sex marriage in England and Wales.

On 12 June 2014, Benton announced that he would not be standing again at the next election. This was after a vote taken by his Constituency Labour Party, which opted to open the selection process rather than automatically re-selecting Benton. His absence from the constituency and frequent work abroad were cited as reasons for members failing to support him.

== Personal life ==
He married Doris Wynne in 1959 in Bootle, who died in 2016, and the couple had four daughters. The tip of Benton's index finger was bitten off by a dog while out campaigning on 6 May 2010 in his Bootle constituency. He was hospitalised and could not vote in the 2010 general election as a result.

On 21 June 2014, Pope Francis conferred a Knighthood of the Pontifical Equestrian Order of St Gregory the Great (KSG) upon Benton in recognition for the contribution he has made to ecclesiastical and civic life on a local and national level.

Parliament of the United Kingdom
Preceded by Mike Carr	Member of Parliament for Bootle; 1990–2015	Succeeded by Peter Dowd
