= 1990 Bootle by-elections =

Two UK parliamentary by-elections

Two by-elections for the United Kingdom parliamentary constituency of Bootle were held in 1990; the first on 24 May, and the second on 8 November. The first by-election, caused by the death of incumbent Labour Party Member of Parliament (MP) Allan Roberts, was won by Labour candidate Michael Carr. On 20 July, Carr died after just 57 days in office, triggering another by-election which was won by Joe Benton, who once again held the seat for Labour.

Bootle was one of the Labour Party's safest seats, having held the seat since 1945.

This was the first instance of multiple by-elections being held in the same constituency in the same year since the April and August by-elections in Fermanagh and South Tyrone of 1981.

== 24 May by-election ==
May 1990 Bootle by-election
- 24 May 1990

Constituency of Bootle
- Turnout: 50.6% (▼22.3%)
	First party	Second party	Third party
Candidate	Michael Carr	James Clappison	John Cunningham
Party	Labour	Conservative	Liberal Democrats
Popular vote	26,737	3,220	3,179
Percentage	75.4%	9.1%	8.9%
Swing	▲8.5%	▼11.0%	▼4.1%
MP before election
Allan Roberts
Labour
Subsequent MP
Michael Carr
Labour

The first by-election was caused by the death of Labour MP Allan Roberts, on 21 March 1990. Roberts had held the seat since the 1979 general election, and his majority had remained over 15,000 votes; even at the 1983 general election, which was a landslide victory for the Conservative Party. At the 1987 general election, Roberts' majority had increased to almost 25,000 votes.

For the by-election, Labour selected Michael Carr, a full-time official for the Transport and General Workers Union, and a former Labour Party councillor. The Conservatives, who had consistently taken second place in the seat but were struggling in the national polls, nominated James Clappison, a barrister from Yorkshire. He had unsuccessfully contested Barnsley East for the Conservative Party in 1987, and the South Yorkshire constituency at the 1989 European Parliament election.

The newly named Liberal Democrats had suffered in the national polls since their formation by a merger of the Liberal Party and the Social Democratic Party (SDP), and in Bootle they were challenged by both David Owen's 'continuing' Social Democratic Party and Michael Meadowcroft's 'continuing' Liberal Party, each consisting of members of the former SDP–Liberal Alliance parties who had rejected their merger.

The Green Party also nominated a candidate. Screaming Lord Sutch of the Official Monster Raving Loony Party and an independent rounded out the field.

The Loonies gained publicity after the Labour Party election agent unsuccessfully tried to get Sutch charged with having a public house as an election campaign headquarters. This had not been illegal since 1985.

The election was held on 24 May. Despite having to contend with a large field of candidates, Carr increased the Labour vote, to win with more than three-quarters of all the votes cast. The Conservative vote halved, although they retained second place, as the Liberal Democrat vote could not match that of the SDP–Liberal Alliance in 1987. The Greens polled 3.6%, while the continuing Liberals fared poorly, and the 'continuing' Social Democrats were beaten even by the Monster Raving Loonies. Sutch jokingly offered to form a coalition with them, and the party was wound up soon afterwards, but Holmes formed yet another Social Democratic Party of members who wished to continue.

Bootle by-election, May 1990
Party	Candidate	Votes	%	±%
Labour	Michael Carr	26,737	75.4	+8.5
Conservative	James Clappison	3,220	9.1	− 11.0
Liberal Democrats	John Cunningham	3,179	8.9	− 4.1
Green	Sean Brady	1,269	3.6	N/A
Liberal	Kevin White	474	1.3	N/A
Monster Raving Loony	Lord David Sutch	418	1.2	N/A
SDP	Jack Holmes	155	0.4	N/A
Independent	T. J. Schofield	27	0.1	N/A
Majority		23,517	66.3	+19.5
Turnout		35,477	50.6	
Labour hold		Swing	+9.7	

== 8 November by-election ==
November 1990 Bootle by-election
- 8 November 1990

Constituency of Bootle
- Turnout: 39.7% (▼10.9%)
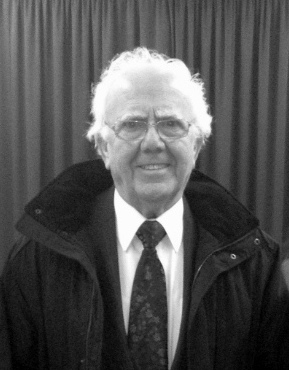
	First party	Second party	Third party
		Con	LD
Candidate	Joe Benton	James Clappison	John Cunningham
Party	Labour	Conservative	Liberal Democrats
Popular vote	22,052	2,587	2,216
Percentage	78.2%	9.2%	7.9%
Swing	▲2.8%	▲0.1%	▼1.0%
MP before election
Michael Carr
Labour
Subsequent MP
Joe Benton
Labour

Carr died on 20 July, only 57 days after his by-election victory. A second by-election was called for 8 November.

Labour nominated Joe Benton, the leader of Sefton Borough Council, a local Justice of the Peace and a personnel manager with Girobank. All the other parties nominated the same candidates as in May, except for the Social Democratic Party which did not participate (neither did the independent Schofield). The only addition to the field was David Black, a candidate in the previous year's Vauxhall and Vale of Glamorgan by-elections, standing as "Christian Alliance".

On a low turnout of 39.7%, Benton increased the Labour Party majority again, taking 78.2% of the vote. The Conservative vote held steady, while all the other parties fell back. This allowed the Loonies to overtake the continuing Liberal Party.

Benton remained as the Member of Parliament for Bootle until he retired in 2015, while Clappison was elected in 1992 for Hertsmere; he too retired in 2015.

Bootle by-election, November 1990
Party	Candidate	Votes	%	±%
Labour	Joe Benton	22,052	78.2	+ 2.8
Conservative	James Clappison	2,587	9.2	+ 0.1
Liberal Democrats	John Cunningham	2,216	7.9	− 1.0
Green	Sean Brady	557	2.0	− 1.6
Monster Raving Loony	Lord David Sutch	310	1.1	− 0.1
Liberal	Kevin White	291	1.0	− 0.3
Christian Alliance	David Black	132	0.5	N/A
Majority		19,465	69.1	
Turnout		28,145	39.7	
Labour hold		Swing	+ 1.5	

== See also ==
- 1911 Bootle by-election
