= Ford, Merseyside =

Coordinates: 53.481°N 2.997°W

Ford
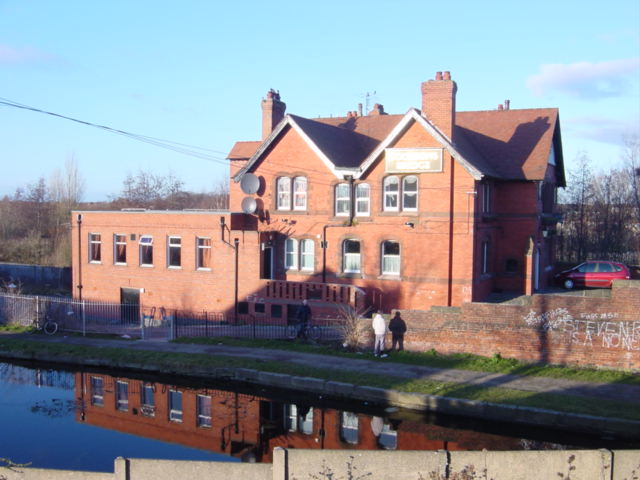
- Cookson's Bridge public house adjacent to the Leeds-Liverpool canal, at Ford

- Location within Merseyside
- OS grid reference: SJ340944
- Metropolitan borough: Sefton
- Metropolitan county: Merseyside
- Region: North West
- Country: England
- Sovereign state: United Kingdom
- Post town: LIVERPOOL
- Postcode district: L21
- Dialling code: 0151
- Police: Merseyside
- Fire: Merseyside
- Ambulance: North West
- UK Parliament: Bootle

Ford is an area and electoral ward in the borough of Sefton, Merseyside, England. The population of Ford taken at the 2011 census was 12,731.

Ford is situated to the east of Crosby next to Rimrose Valley, and north of Litherland and is in the L21 postcode.

== History ==
On 9 November 1905 Ford became a separate civil parish, being formed from Orrell and Ford, on 1 April 1954 the parish was abolished and merged with Litherland. In 1951 the parish had a population of 1392.
