= Thomas Royden, 1st Baron Royden =

British politician (1871-1950)

The Right Honourable The Lord Royden CH DL
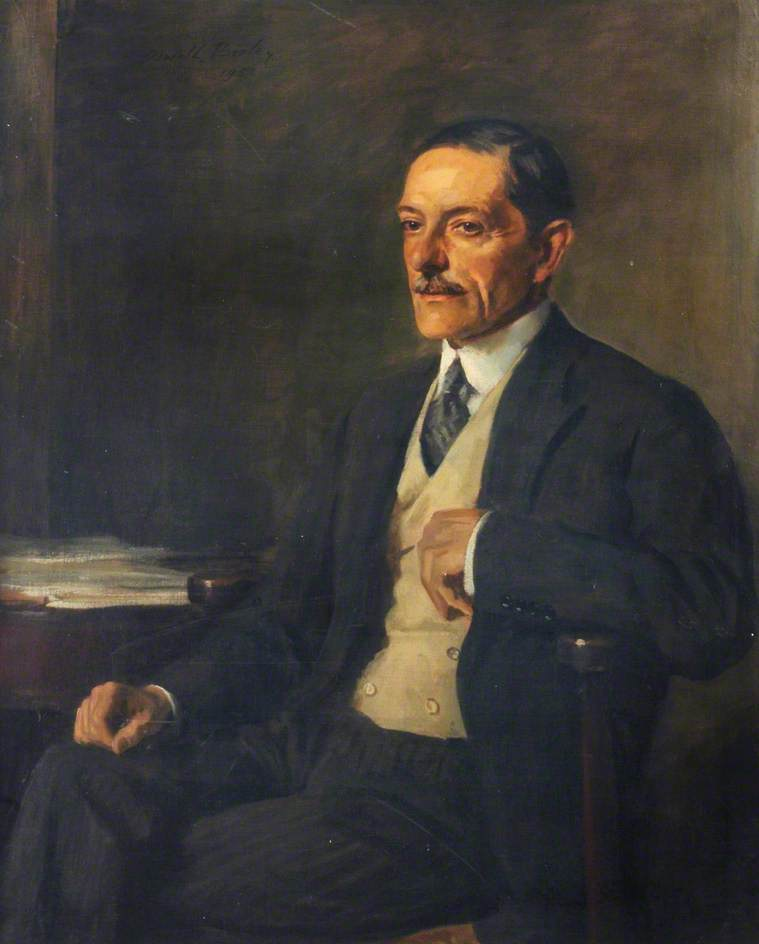
- Lord Royden, by Oswald Birley

Member of Parliament for Bootle
- In office 1918–1922
- Preceded by: Bonar Law
- Succeeded by: James Burnie

Personal details
- Born: 22 May 1871
- Died: 6 November 1950 (aged 79)
- Party: Conservative
- Parent: Sir Thomas Royden, 1st Baronet (father)
- Relatives: Maude Royden (sister)

Thomas Royden, 1st Baron Royden, CH, DL (22 May 1871 – 6 November 1950) was an English businessman and Conservative Party politician.

He was the son of Sir Thomas Royden, 1st Baronet (1831–1917), a Conservative politician and head of the Thomas Royden & Sons shipping company. The younger Thomas inherited the baronetcy on the death of his father in 1917, and went on to become chairman of the Cunard Line.

He was elected at the 1918 general election as Member of Parliament (MP) for Bootle, having stood as a Coalition Conservative (a holder of the "coalition coupon" issued to candidates supporting of the Conservative-Liberal Party coalition government. He did not stand for re-election in the 1922 general election.

He was made a Member of the Order of the Companions of Honour in 1919. His sister Maude Royden "eminent in the religious life of the nation" was appointed to the Order of the Companions of Honour in the 1930 New Year Honours; they are the only siblings to be Members of the Order of the Companions of Honour. He was ennobled on 28 January 1944 as Baron Royden, of Frankby in the County Palatine of Chester. He died in 1950 aged 79.

Parliament of the United Kingdom
Preceded by Bonar Law	Member of Parliament for Bootle; 1918 – 1922	Succeeded by James Burnie
Baronetage of the United Kingdom
Preceded by Thomas Bland Royden	Baronet (of Frankby Hall); 1917–1950	Succeeded by Ernest Bland Royden
Peerage of the United Kingdom
New creation	Baron Royden; 1944–1950	Extinct
