= Bootle (constituency) =

Parliamentary constituency in the United Kingdom, 1885 onwards

Coordinates: 53.446°N 2.989°W

- Borough constituency for the House of Commons
- Interactive map of boundaries since 2010
- Location within North West England
- County: Merseyside
- Population: 98,449 (2011 census)
- Electorate: 75,194 (March 2020)
- Major settlements: Bootle, Crosby, Waterloo, Seaforth, Litherland, Netherton, Orrell and Ford.

Current constituency
- Created: 1885
- Member of Parliament: Peter Dowd (Labour)
- Seats: One
- Created from: South West Lancashire

Bootle is a constituency (Note: A borough constituency (for the purposes of election expenses and type of returning officer)) which has been represented in the House of Commons of the UK Parliament, since 2015 by Peter Dowd of the Labour Party. (Note: As with all constituencies, the constituency elects one member of parliament (MP) by the first past the post system of election at least every five years.)

== Constituency profile ==
The Bootle constituency is located in the Metropolitan Borough of Sefton within the county of Merseyside. It is part of Liverpool's urban area and lies to the north of the city centre. Within the constituency are the towns of Bootle, Litherland and Waterloo. Like much of Merseyside, the Bootle area has a maritime history, a large Irish-descended population, and has experienced economic decline with the decrease in importance of the Port of Liverpool.

Compared to national averages, residents of the constituency are more religious and have lower levels of wealth, education and professional employment. House prices are very low and there is a large proportion of social housing. White people make up 95% of the population. At the local council, almost all of the seats in the Bootle constituency are represented by Labour Party councillors. It is estimated that voters in the constituency were evenly split in the 2016 referendum on European Union membership, with 50% supporting and 50% opposing Brexit.

== History ==
From 1885 to 1935, the constituency returned mostly Conservative MPs, with its most notable MP being Conservative Party leader Bonar Law from 1911 to 1918, when property qualifications for the vote were abolished. Bonar Law would later serve as UK prime minister from 1922 to 1923, though at that point he no longer represented Bootle in the House of Commons. James Burnie of the Liberal Party held the seat from 1922 to 1924, and the seat was briefly held by John Kinley from the Labour Party from 1929 to 1931 and became a Conservative–Labour marginal seat in the 1930s when the mainstream Labour party formed the National Government. The Labour Party has held it continuously since the 1945 general election; this period saw two decades of steep decline in the profitability of Liverpool Docks, manufacturing and shipbuilding, which employed many constituents. At the three general elections from 1997, Bootle was the safest seat for any party in the United Kingdom by percentage of majority.

In 1990, two by-elections were held in Bootle. The first followed the death of Allan Roberts on 21 February, and was held on 24 May. Jack Holmes, the candidate of the continuing Social Democratic Party (representing the faction of the party which did not merge with the Liberal Democrats) was beaten by Screaming Lord Sutch of the Official Monster Raving Loony Party, contributing to the end of the SDP. The victorious Labour candidate, Michael Carr unexpectedly died on 20 July 1990 after just 57 days in office.

The second by-election, held on 8 November 1990, was won by the Labour candidate, Joe Benton. Benton retained Bootle at the next four general elections with large majorities. At the 2005 general election, the seat was the safest seat by percentage of majority and had the highest winning share of the vote. In June 2014, Benton announced that he would retire at the 2015 general election.

The 2015 result made the seat the fifth-safest of Labour's 232 seats by percentage of majority (with a winning vote share of 74.5% and a majority of 63.6%). Bootle remained a safe seat into the 2020s, becoming the safest seat for Labour by this metric in 2024 (despite a decrease of the vote share by 10.7%) with a winning vote share of 68.7%; this gave Labour a 56.5% majority over Reform UK.

== Boundaries ==
=== Historic ===
Bootle in Lancashire, boundaries used 1974–1983

1885–1918: The Boroughs of Bootle-cum-Linacre and Liverpool, the parishes of Childwall, Fazakerley, Walton-on-the-Hill, and Wavertree, and parts of the parishes of Toxteth Park and West Derby.

1918–1950: The County Borough of Bootle.

1950–1955: The County Borough of Bootle, and the Urban District of Litherland.

1955–1974: The County Borough of Bootle.

1974–1983: The County Borough of Bootle, and the Urban District of Litherland.

1983–1997: The Metropolitan Borough of Sefton wards of Church, Derby, Ford, Linacre, Litherland, Netherton, Orrell, and St Oswald.

1997–2010: As above less Church ward.

2010–2026: The Metropolitan Borough of Sefton wards of Church, Derby, Ford, Linacre, Litherland, Netherton and Orrell, St Oswald, and Victoria.

Boundary changes that came into force as a result of the 2010 general election being called saw the constituency grow to also include parts of the old Crosby constituency, with the electoral wards of Church and Victoria being added. Although these areas are more affluent than some parts of Bootle, it has not made the seat any less safe for Labour.

The 2023 Periodic Review of Westminster constituencies left the boundaries unchanged.

=== Current ===
Following a local government boundary review which did not affect the constituency boundaries, the seat comprises the following wards of the Metropolitan Borough of Sefton with effect from May 2026:

- Bootle East; Bootle West; Ford; Great Crosby; Litherland; Netherton North; Netherton South & Orrell; Waterloo.

The constituency covers the southern part of the Metropolitan Borough of Sefton in Merseyside. This comprises Bootle itself plus other localities including Crosby, Waterloo, Seaforth, Litherland, Netherton, Orrell and Ford.

== Members of Parliament ==
Election	Member	Party
1885	Thomas Sandys	Conservative
1911 by-election	Bonar Law	Conservative
1918	Sir Thomas Royden, Bt.	Coalition Conservative
1922	James Burnie	Liberal
1924	Vivian Henderson	Conservative
1929	John Kinley	Labour
1931	Chichester Crookshank	Conservative
1935	Eric Errington	Conservative
1945	John Kinley	Labour
1955	Simon Mahon	Labour
1979	Allan Roberts	Labour
1990 by-election (May)	Michael Carr	Labour
1990 by-election (Nov)	Joe Benton	Labour
2015	Peter Dowd	Labour

== Elections ==
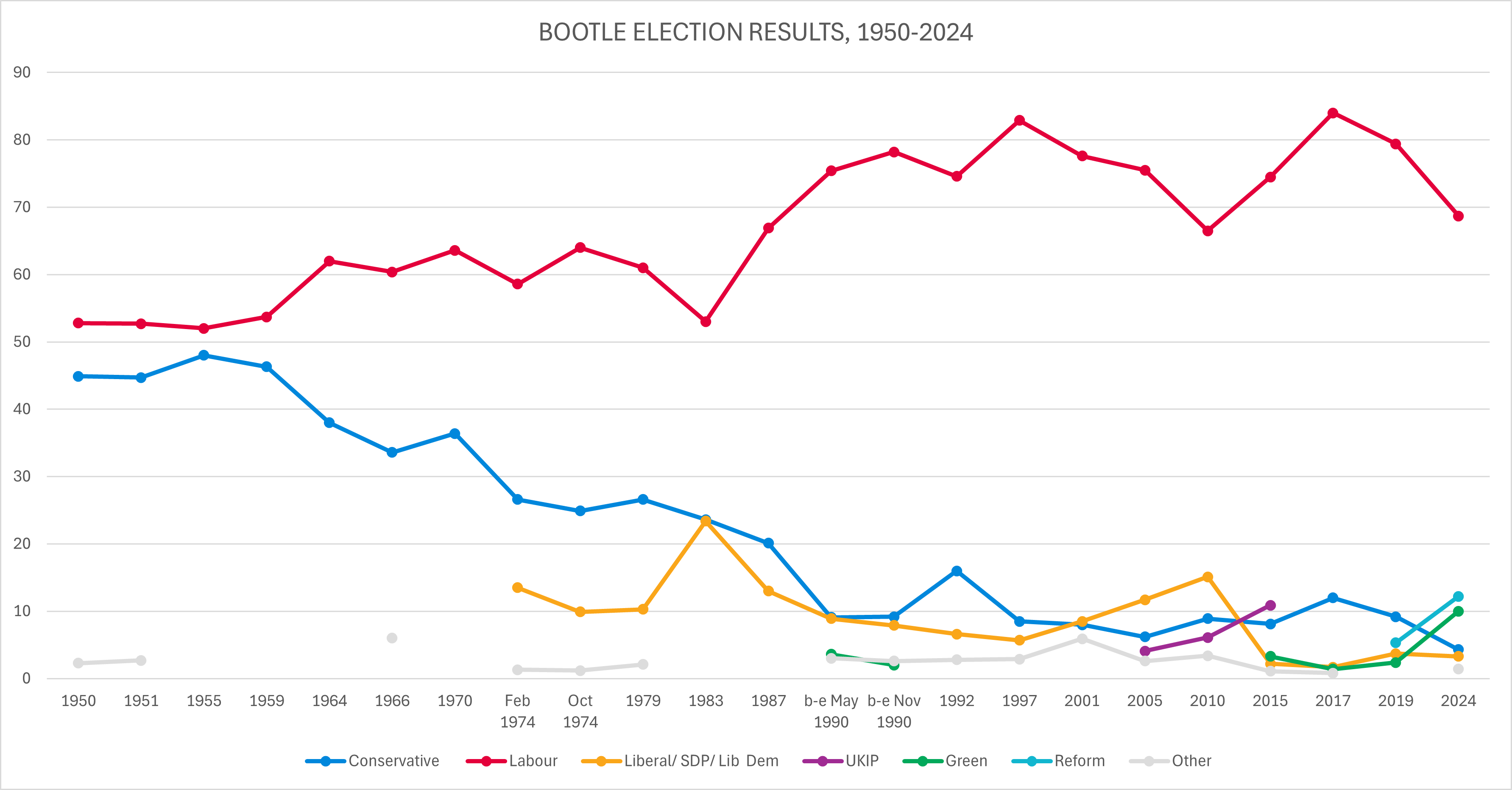
Election results 1950–2024

=== Elections in the 2020s ===
General election 2024: Bootle
Party	Candidate	Votes	%	±%
Labour	Peter Dowd	26,729	68.7	−10.7
Reform	Darren Burns	4,746	12.2	+6.9
Green	Neil Doolin	3,904	10.0	+7.6
Conservative	Rowena Bass	1,674	4.3	−4.9
Liberal Democrats	John Gibson	1,301	3.3	−0.4
Workers Party	Ian Smith	526	1.4	New
Majority		21,983	56.5	−13.7
Turnout		38,880	53.2	−12.2
Labour hold		Swing		

=== Elections in the 2010s ===
General election 2019: Bootle
Party	Candidate	Votes	%	±%
Labour	Peter Dowd	39,066	79.4	−4.6
Conservative	Tarsilo Onuluk	4,510	9.2	−2.8
Brexit Party	Kim Knight	2,610	5.3	New
Liberal Democrats	Rebecca Hanson	1,822	3.7	+2.0
Green	Mike Carter	1,166	2.4	+1.0
Majority		34,556	70.2	−1.8
Turnout		49,174	65.7	−3.5
Labour hold		Swing	−0.85	

General election 2017: Bootle
Party	Candidate	Votes	%	±%
Labour	Peter Dowd	42,259	84.0	+9.5
Conservative	Charles Fifield	6,059	12.0	+3.9
Liberal Democrats	David Newman	837	1.7	−0.5
Green	Alison Gibbon	709	1.4	−1.9
Socialist Labour	Kim Bryan	424	0.8	New
Majority		36,200	72.0	+8.4
Turnout		50,288	69.2	+4.8
Labour hold		Swing	+2.8	

General election 2015: Bootle
Party	Candidate	Votes	%	±%
Labour	Peter Dowd	33,619	74.5	+8.0
UKIP	Paul Nuttall	4,915	10.9	+4.8
Conservative	Jade Marsden	3,639	8.1	−0.8
Green	Lisa Tallis	1,501	3.3	New
Liberal Democrats	David Newman	978	2.2	−12.9
TUSC	Peter Glover	500	1.1	±0.0
Majority		28,704	63.6	+12.2
Turnout		45,152	64.4	+6.6
Labour hold		Swing	+1.6	

General election 2010: Bootle
Party	Candidate	Votes	%	±%
Labour	Joe Benton	27,426	66.5	−9.0
Liberal Democrats	James Murray	6,245	15.1	+3.5
Conservative	Sohail Qureshi	3,678	8.9	+2.8
UKIP	Paul Nuttall	2,514	6.1	+2.8
BNP	Charles Stewart	942	2.3	New
TUSC	Peter Glover	472	1.1	New
Majority		21,181	51.4	−12.4
Turnout		41,227	57.8	+7.0
Labour hold		Swing	−1.6	

=== Elections in the 2000s ===
General election 2005: Bootle
Party	Candidate	Votes	%	±%
Labour	Joe Benton	19,345	75.5	−2.1
Liberal Democrats	Chris Newby	2,988	11.7	+3.2
Conservative	Wafik Moustafa	1,580	6.2	−1.8
UKIP	Paul Nuttall	1,054	4.1	New
Socialist	Peter Glover	655	2.6	+0.2
Majority		16,357	63.8	−5.3
Turnout		25,622	47.7	−2.1
Labour hold		Swing	−2.6	

General election 2001: Bootle
Party	Candidate	Votes	%	±%
Labour	Joe Benton	21,400	77.6	−5.3
Liberal Democrats	Jim Murray	2,357	8.5	+2.8
Conservative	Judith Symes	2,194	8.0	−0.5
Socialist Labour	Dave Flynn	971	3.5	+2.4
Socialist Alliance	Peter Glover	672	2.4	New
Majority		19,043	69.1	−5.3
Turnout		27,594	49.8	−16.9
Labour hold		Swing	−5.3	

=== Elections in the 1990s ===
General election 1997: Bootle
Party	Candidate	Votes	%	±%
Labour	Joe Benton	31,668	82.9	+8.3
Conservative	Rupert Matthews	3,247	8.5	−7.5
Liberal Democrats	Kiron Reid	2,191	5.7	−0.9
Referendum	James Elliot	571	1.5	New
Socialist Labour	Peter Glover	420	1.1	New
Natural Law	Simon Cohen	126	0.3	−0.2
Majority		28,421	74.4	+15.8
Turnout		38,223	66.7	−5.8
Labour hold		Swing	+6.0	

General election 1992: Bootle
Party	Candidate	Votes	%	±%
Labour	Joe Benton	37,464	74.6	+7.7
Conservative	Christopher J. Varley	8,022	16.0	−4.1
Liberal Democrats	John Cunningham	3,301	6.6	−6.4
Liberal	Medina Hall	1,174	2.3	New
Natural Law	Thomas Haynes	264	0.5	New
Majority		29,442	58.6	+11.8
Turnout		50,225	72.5	−0.4
Labour hold		Swing	+5.9	

November 1990 Bootle by-election
Party	Candidate	Votes	%	±%
Labour	Joe Benton	22,052	78.2	+2.8
Conservative	James Clappison	2,587	9.2	+0.1
Liberal Democrats	John Cunningham	2,216	7.9	−1.0
Green	Sean Brady	557	2.0	−1.6
Monster Raving Loony	Screaming Lord Sutch	310	1.1	−0.1
Liberal	Kevin White	291	1.0	−0.3
Christian Alliance	David Black	132	0.5	New
Majority		19,465	69.0	+2.7
Turnout		28,145	39.7	−10.9
Labour hold		Swing	+1.5	

May 1990 Bootle by-election
Party	Candidate	Votes	%	±%
Labour	Michael Carr	26,737	75.4	+8.5
Conservative	James Clappison	3,220	9.1	−11.0
Liberal Democrats	John Cunningham	3,179	8.9	−4.1
Green	Sean Brady	1,269	3.6	New
Liberal	Kevin White	474	1.3	New
Monster Raving Loony	Screaming Lord Sutch	418	1.2	New
SDP	Jack Holmes	155	0.4	New
Independent	T. J. Schofield	27	0.1	New
Majority		23,517	66.3	+19.5
Turnout		35,477	50.6	−22.3
Labour hold		Swing	+9.8	

=== Elections in the 1980s ===
General election 1987: Bootle
Party	Candidate	Votes	%	±%
Labour	Allan Roberts	34,975	66.9	+13.9
Conservative	Peter Papworth	10,498	20.1	−3.5
SDP	Paul Denham	6,820	13.0	−10.4
Majority		24,477	46.8	+17.4
Turnout		52,293	72.9	+4.6
Labour hold		Swing	+8.7	

General election 1983: Bootle
Party	Candidate	Votes	%	±%
Labour	Allan Roberts	27,282	53.0	−8.0
Conservative	Ronald Watson	12,143	23.6	−3.0
SDP	John Wall	12,068	23.4	+13.1
Majority		15,139	29.4	−5.0
Turnout		51,493	68.3	−2.1
Labour hold		Swing		

=== Elections in the 1970s ===
General election 1979: Bootle
Party	Candidate	Votes	%	±%
Labour	Allan Roberts	26,900	61.0	−3.0
Conservative	Ronald Watson	11,741	26.6	+1.7
Liberal	D.L. Mahon	4,531	10.3	+0.4
Independent Liberal	H.I. Fjortoft	911	2.1	New
Majority		15,159	34.4	−4.7
Turnout		44,083	70.4	+3.2
Labour hold		Swing	−2.4	

General election October 1974: Bootle
Party	Candidate	Votes	%	±%
Labour	Simon Mahon	27,633	64.0	+5.4
Conservative	J F Borrows	10,743	24.9	−1.7
Liberal	H.I. Fjortoft	4,266	9.9	−3.6
Communist	R. Morris	516	1.2	−0.1
Majority		16,890	39.1	+7.1
Turnout		43,158	67.2	−6.1
Labour hold		Swing	+3.6	

General election February 1974: Bootle
Party	Candidate	Votes	%	±%
Labour	Simon Mahon	27,301	58.6	−5.0
Conservative	J.F. Borrows	12,366	26.6	−9.8
Liberal	H.I. Fjortoft	6,258	13.5	New
Communist	R. Morris	586	1.3	New
Majority		14,935	32.0	+4.8
Turnout		46,511	73.3	+8.1
Labour hold		Swing	+2.4	

General election 1970: Bootle
Party	Candidate	Votes	%	±%
Labour	Simon Mahon	20,101	63.6	+3.2
Conservative	G. Halliwell	11,496	36.4	+2.8
Majority		8,614	27.2	+0.4
Turnout		31,633	65.2	−3.0
Labour hold		Swing	+0.2	

=== Elections in the 1960s ===
General election 1966: Bootle
Party	Candidate	Votes	%	±%
Labour	Simon Mahon	19,412	60.4	−1.6
Conservative	George Halliwell	10,813	33.6	−4.4
Independent Labour	William Grant	1,931	6.0	New
Majority		8,599	26.8	+2.8
Turnout		32,156	68.2	−2.7
Labour hold		Swing	+1.4	

General election 1964: Bootle
Party	Candidate	Votes	%	±%
Labour	Simon Mahon	21,677	62.0	+8.3
Conservative	George Halliwell	13,285	38.0	−8.3
Majority		8,392	24.0	+16.6
Turnout		34,962	70.9	−7.4
Labour hold		Swing	+8.3	

=== Elections in the 1950s ===
General election 1959: Bootle
Party	Candidate	Votes	%	±%
Labour	Simon Mahon	21,294	53.7	+1.7
Conservative	Harry O Cullen	18,379	46.3	−1.7
Majority		2,915	7.4	+3.4
Turnout		39,673	78.3	+2.6
Labour hold		Swing	+1.7	

General election 1955: Bootle
Party	Candidate	Votes	%	±%
Labour	Simon Mahon	19,020	52.0	−0.7
Conservative	Herbert W Jones	17,582	48.0	+3.3
Majority		1,438	4.0	−4.0
Turnout		36,602	75.7	−5.5
Labour hold		Swing	−2.0	

General election 1951: Bootle
Party	Candidate	Votes	%	±%
Labour	John Kinley	26,597	52.7	−0.1
Conservative	A Owen Hughes	22,535	44.7	−0.2
Anti-Partition	Harry McHugh	1,340	2.7	+0.4
Majority		4,062	8.0	+0.1
Turnout		50,472	81.2	−0.9
Labour hold		Swing	+0.2	

General election 1950: Bootle
Party	Candidate	Votes	%	±%
Labour	John Kinley	25,472	52.8	−5.8
Conservative	W. Hill	21,673	44.9	+3.5
Anti-Partition	Bernard McGinnity	1,029	2.3	New
Majority		3,799	7.9	−9.3
Turnout		48,174	82.1	+12.4
Labour hold		Swing	−4.7	

=== Elections in the 1940s ===
General election 1945: Bootle
Party	Candidate	Votes	%	±%
Labour	John Kinley	15,823	58.6	+19.8
Conservative	Eric Errington	11,180	41.4	−7.2
Majority		4,643	17.2	N/A
Turnout		27,003	69.7	−1.6
Labour gain from Conservative		Swing		

=== Elections in the 1930s ===
General election 1935: Bootle
Party	Candidate	Votes	%	±%
Conservative	Eric Errington	16,653	48.6	−13.3
Labour	John Kinley	13,285	38.8	+0.7
Liberal	James Burnie	4,319	12.6	New
Majority		3,368	9.8	−14.0
Turnout		34,257	71.3	−7.6
Conservative hold		Swing		

General election 1931: Bootle
Party	Candidate	Votes	%	±%
Conservative	Chichester Crookshank	22,966	61.9	+21.2
Labour	John Kinley	14,160	38.1	−5.5
Majority		8,806	23.8	N/A
Turnout		37,126	78.9	+1.0
Conservative gain from Labour		Swing		

=== Elections in the 1920s ===
General election 1929: Bootle
Party	Candidate	Votes	%	±%
Labour	John Kinley	15,294	43.6	+8.9
Unionist	Vivian Henderson	14,263	40.7	−4.8
Liberal	Ernest Eric Edwards	5,523	15.7	−4.1
Majority		1,031	2.9	N/A
Turnout		35,080	77.9	+0.9
Labour gain from Unionist		Swing	+6.8	

General election 1924: Bootle
Party	Candidate	Votes	%	±%
Unionist	Vivian Henderson	12,361	45.5	+3.4
Labour	John Kinley	9,427	34.7	+20.9
Liberal	James Burnie	5,386	19.8	−24.3
Majority		2,934	10.8	N/A
Turnout		27,174	77.0	+8.9
Unionist gain from Liberal		Swing		

General election 1923: Bootle
Party	Candidate	Votes	%	±%
Liberal	James Burnie	10,444	44.1	−12.2
Unionist	Vivian Henderson	9,991	42.1	+0.2
Labour	John Kinley	3,272	13.8	New
Majority		453	2.0	−12.4
Turnout		23,707	68.1	−3.0
Liberal hold		Swing	−6.2	

General election 1922: Bootle
Party	Candidate	Votes	%	±%
Liberal	James Burnie	13,276	56.3	New
Unionist	Alexander Bicket	9,867	41.9	−21.1
Independent	J E Burke	425	1.8	New
Majority		3,409	14.4	N/A
Turnout		23,568	71.1	+12.6
Liberal gain from Unionist		Swing		

=== Elections in the 1910s ===
General election 1918: Bootle
Party		Candidate	Votes	%	±%
C	Unionist	Thomas Royden	12,312	63.0	N/A
	Sailors' Union	Edmund Cathery	7,235	37.0	New
Majority			5,077	26.0	N/A
Turnout			19,547	58.5	N/A
	Unionist hold		Swing		
C indicates candidate endorsed by the coalition government.

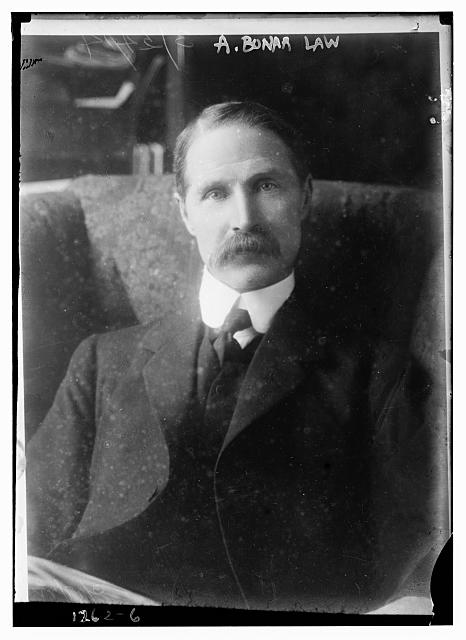
Bonar Law

General Election 1914–15:

Another General Election was required to take place before the end of 1915. The political parties had been making preparations for an election to take place and by July 1914, the following candidates had been selected;

- Unionist: Bonar Law
- Liberal:

1911 Bootle by-election
Party	Candidate	Votes	%	±%
Conservative	Bonar Law	9,976	56.2	N/A
Liberal	Max Muspratt	7,782	43.8	New
Majority		2,194	12.4	N/A
Turnout		17,758	69.7	N/A
Conservative hold		Swing	N/A	

General election December 1910: Bootle
Party	Candidate	Votes	%	±%
Conservative	Thomas Sandys	Unopposed		
Conservative hold				

General election January 1910: Bootle
Party	Candidate	Votes	%	±%
Conservative	Thomas Sandys	9,954	52.9	+1.8
Liberal	William Permewan	8,869	47.1	−1.8
Majority		1,085	5.8	+3.6
Turnout		18,823	78.7	+4.9
Conservative hold		Swing		

=== Elections in the 1900s ===
General election 1906: Bootle
Party	Candidate	Votes	%	±%
Conservative	Thomas Sandys	7,821	51.1	N/A
Liberal	Alfred Patten Thomas	7,481	48.9	New
Majority		340	2.2	N/A
Turnout		15,302	73.8	N/A
Registered electors		20,721		
Conservative hold		Swing	N/A	

General election 1900: Bootle
Party	Candidate	Votes	%	±%
Conservative	Thomas Sandys	Unopposed		
Conservative hold				

=== Elections in the 1890s ===
General election 1895: Bootle
Party	Candidate	Votes	%	±%
Conservative	Thomas Sandys	Unopposed		
Conservative hold				

Sandys

General election 1892: Bootle
Party	Candidate	Votes	%	±%
Conservative	Thomas Sandys	6,532	59.4	N/A
Liberal	Alexander McDougall	4,460	40.6	New
Majority		2,072	18.8	N/A
Turnout		10,992	69.7	N/A
Registered electors		15,772		
Conservative hold		Swing	N/A	

=== Elections in the 1880s ===
General election 1886: Bootle
Party	Candidate	Votes	%	±%
Conservative	Thomas Sandys	Unopposed		
Conservative hold				

General election 1885: Bootle
Party	Candidate	Votes	%	±%
Conservative	Thomas Sandys	6,715	63.1	
Liberal	Samuel Whitbread	3,933	36.9	
Majority		2,782	26.2	
Turnout		10,648	72.6	
Registered electors		14,663		
Conservative win (new seat)				

== See also ==
- List of parliamentary constituencies in Merseyside

== Sources ==
- Election results, 1950 – 2005
- F. W. S. Craig, British Parliamentary Election Results 1885 – 1918
- F. W. S. Craig, British Parliamentary Election Results 1918 – 1949
