= List of settlements in Merseyside by population =

The 22 largest settlements of the county of Merseyside, with district centres in yellow, and key towns and areas in white.

This is a list of settlements in Merseyside by population based on the results of the 2011 census. In 2011, there were 20 built-up area subdivisions with 5,000 or more inhabitants in Merseyside, shown in the table below.

== Administrative boundaries ==

Table outlines many of the county's settlements, formatted according to their metropolitan borough:

1. City of Liverpool governed from Liverpool City Centre:
  Aigburth, Allerton, Anfield, Belle Vale, Broadgreen, Canning, Childwall, Chinatown, Clubmoor, Croxteth, Dingle, Dovecot, Edge Hill, Everton, Fairfield, Fazakerley, Garston, Gateacre, Gillmoss, Grassendale, Hunt's Cross, Kensington, Kirkdale, Knotty Ash, Mossley Hill, Netherley, Norris Green, Old Swan, Orrell Park, St Michael's Hamlet, Sefton Park, Speke, Stoneycroft, Toxteth, Tuebrook, Vauxhall, Walton, Wavertree, West Derby, Woolton
2. Sefton from Bootle and Southport:
  Ainsdale, Aintree, Birkdale, Blowick, Blundellsands, Churchtown, Crosby, Crossens, Ford, Formby, Hightown, Hillside, Ince Blundell, Kennessee Green Litherland, Little Altcar, Little Crosby, Lunt, Lydiate, Maghull, Marshside, Melling, Netherton, Orrell, Seaforth, Sefton, Thornton, Waterloo, Woodvale
3. Knowsley from Huyton:
  Bowring Park, Cronton, Fazakerley, Halewood, Kirkby, Knowsley, Page Moss, Prescot, Roby, Stockbridge Village, Tarbock, Whiston
4. St Helens from St Helens:
  Billinge, Blackbrook, Bold, Bold Heath, Clock Face, Crank, Earlestown, Eccleston, Garswood, Haydock, Moss Bank, Newton-le-Willows, Old Boston, Parr, Rainford, Rainhill, Ravenhead, Seneley Green, Sutton, Thatto Heath, Windle
5. Wirral from Wallasey:
  Barnston, Bebington, Beechwood, Bidston, Birkenhead, Brimstage, Bromborough, Caldy, Clatterbridge, Claughton, Eastham, Egremont, Frankby, Gayton, Grange, Greasby, Heswall, Hoylake, Irby, Landican, Larton, Leasowe, Liscard, Meols, Moreton, New Brighton, New Ferry, Newton, Noctorum, Oxton, Pensby, Port Sunlight, Poulton, Prenton, Raby Mere, Raby, Rock Ferry, Saughall Massie, Seacombe, Spital, Storeton, Thingwall, Thornton Hough, Thurstaston, Tranmere, Upton, Wallasey Village, West Kirby, Woodchurch, Woodside.

== Population ranking ==
#	Settlement	Population	
#	Settlement	Census 2001	Census 2011
1	Liverpool^{†(see notes)}	530,850	552,267
2	Birkenhead	138,270	142,968
3	St Helens	102,360	102,885
4	Southport	91,400	91,703
5	Wallasey	58,710	60,284
6	Bebington	56,479	57,336
7	Bootle	56,317	51,394
8	Crosby	51,790	50,044
9	Kirkby	41,010	42,744
10	Prescot	39,200	37,911
11	Heswall	29,977	29,789
12	Maghull	28,848	26,997
13	Formby	24,478	23,329
14	Newton-le-Willows	21,476	22,114
15	Halewood	20,309	20,116
16	Litherland	17,880	18,507
17	Haydock	17,195	16,521
18	West Kirby	14,649	14,959
19	Hoylake	10,875	10,909
20	Garswood^{‡(see notes)}	6,433	6,183
21	Billinge	6,297	5,896
22	Rainford	6,320	5,831

Notes:

- † - Huyton and Halewood included in Liverpool count for ONS subdivision area purposes. Liverpool borough-only figures at 2001/2011 censuses were 439,473 and 466,415.
- ‡ - Garswood with Downall Green fall under the Metropolitan Borough of St Helens in Merseyside. These make up the western portion of Ashton-in-Makerfield, which itself is in the Metropolitan Borough of Wigan in neighbouring Greater Manchester.

== See also ==
- Merseyside
- Liverpool built-up area
