= Molyneux (ward) =

Coordinates: 53.4916°N 2.9292°W

Molyneux is a Metropolitan Borough of Sefton ward in the Sefton Central Parliamentary constituency that covers the localities of Aintree, Melling, Waddicar and the southern part of Maghull. The population of the ward as at the 2011 census was 12,763.

== Councillors ==
Term	Councillor	Party
2010–Present	Anthony Carr	Labour Party
2011–Present	Marion Lauren Atkinson	Labour Party
2012–Present	Paula Murphy	Labour Party

== Election results ==
=== Elections of the 2010s ===
Sefton Metropolitan Borough Council Municipal Elections 2011: Molyneux
Party	Candidate	Votes	%	±%
Labour	Marion Lauren Atkinson	2494	58%	
Liberal Democrats	Jack Colbert	1004	23%	
Conservative	John Jarvis	416	10%	
UKIP	Peter Johnston Harper	404	9%	
Majority				
Turnout		4318	44%	
Labour gain from Liberal Democrats		Swing		

Sefton Metropolitan Borough Council Municipal Elections 2010: Molyneux
Party	Candidate	Votes	%	±%
Labour	Anthony Carr	2983	43%	
Liberal Democrats	Jack Colbert	2297	33%	
Conservative	Thomas James Moylan	937	14%	
UKIP	Peter Johnston Harper	659	10%	
Majority				
Turnout		6876	69%	
Labour gain from Liberal Democrats		Swing		
