= Thornton, Merseyside =

Coordinates: 53.50153°N 3.00087°W

Thornton
- Village
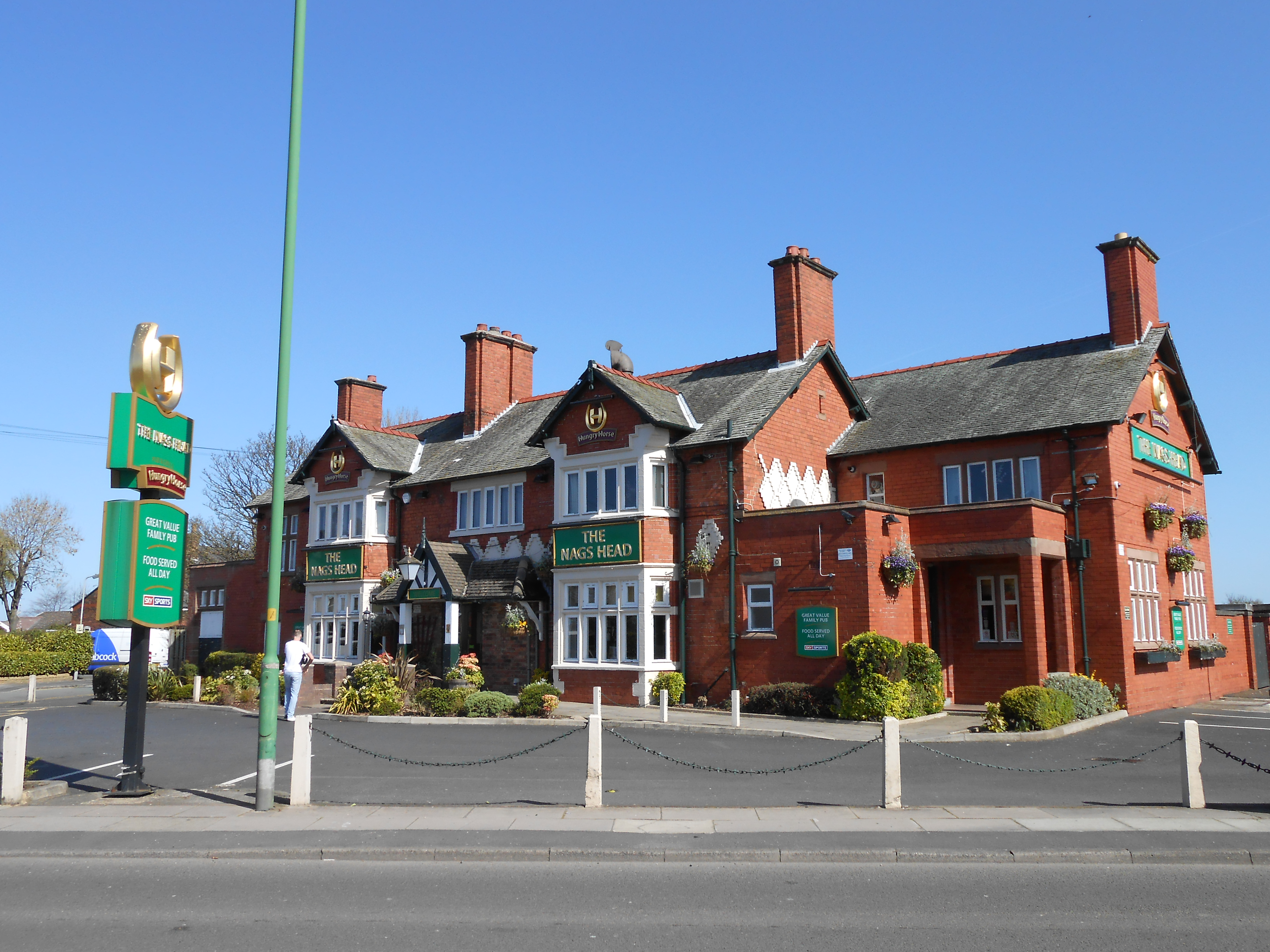
- The Nags Head public house, Thornton

- Location within Merseyside
- Population: 2,200 (2021 Census)
- OS grid reference: SD337010
- Civil parish: Thornton
- Metropolitan borough: Sefton
- Metropolitan county: Merseyside
- Region: North West
- Country: England
- Sovereign state: United Kingdom
- Post town: LIVERPOOL
- Postcode district: L23
- Dialling code: 0151
- Police: Merseyside
- Fire: Merseyside
- Ambulance: North West
- UK Parliament: Sefton Central

Thornton is a village in the Metropolitan Borough of Sefton, in Merseyside, England. Within the boundaries of the historic county of Lancashire and situated to the north east of Crosby, it is a residential area of semi-detached and detached housing which dates mainly from the 1930s. Many of the houses, particularly those around Edge Lane and Water Street, feature notably long gardens. The A565 Liverpool-Southport road serves the area. At the 2001 Census the population of the village and civil parish was recorded as 2,262, falling to 2,139 at the Census 2011.

== History ==
Historically part of Lancashire. During the compilation of the Domesday Book in 1086, the settlement of Torentún is recorded, along with the settlement of Homer Green, which far outdates any claim that Ince Blundell is the oldest village in Sefton. Thornton was combined with Crosby Village and Blundellsands to form the Great Crosby urban district. The district subsequently became part the municipal borough of Crosby in 1937. Thornton was still served by West Lancashire Council until the formation of the Metropolitan Borough of Sefton on 1 April 1974. Thornton still however retains Parish Council status and therefore has a historical boundary.

== Governance ==
From 1950 until 2010 Thornton was within the boundaries of the Crosby constituency, whose MP from 1997 till 2010 was Claire Curtis-Thomas, a member of the Labour Party, prior to her election the Crosby seat was generally considered to be a safe Conservative Party stronghold with Tory MP's elected at every election barring the 1981 Crosby by-election where Shirley Williams of the Social Democratic Party was elected to represent the constituency. As a result of boundary revisions for the 2010 general election the Crosby constituency was abolished with its northern parts, including Thornton, being merged with the Eastern parts of Sefton that were formerly part of the Knowsley North and Sefton East constituency, to form the new constituency of Sefton Central, which is currently represented by the Labour Party MP Bill Esterson.

For elections to Sefton Council Thornton is within the Manor electoral ward and is represented by three councillors. The councillors of Manor ward are Martyn Barber of the Conservative Party, John Gibson of the Liberal Democrats, and Steve McGinnity of the Labour Party.

== Description ==
The Parish Council consists of seven councillors, who are all local residents. They meet on the first Monday of each month at Holy Family Catholic High School. Notice of these meetings are displayed on the Parish website and on the village notice board on The Crescent.

There are three schools in Thornton: St William Of York RC Primary School, Holy Family Catholic High School and Thornton College, which is an annexe of Hugh Baird College. In 2003, Cherie Blair QC, wife of former British Prime Minister Tony Blair, officially came to Thornton to open Holy Family's new Sixth Form building.

There are two churches in Thornton: The King's Church, Drummond Road and St William Of York RC Church, St William Road. St Frideswydes C of E Church, formerly on Water Street, was demolished in 2012 and merged with All Saints C of E Church at the north end of Great Crosby.

Thornton also has two historical public houses dating back to the early 19th century called the Nags Head, which is situated opposite Water Street, and the Grapes Hotel.

Thornton has set of stocks located at the junction of Green Lane & Water Street. These, along with the local sundial, can be dated back to the late 18th century and are Grade II listed monuments. There is another Grade II listed monument located in Back Lane called Brooms Cross. This is a wayside cross which lies on what was the old bridleway that ran from Hightown / Ince Blundell to Sefton Parish Church, St. Helens. It was here that funeral processions would come to rest and have refreshments before continuing to the church. Unfortunately this monument, which was restored to celebrate the Queen's Silver Jubilee Year of 1977, has become the target of vandals.

== Freedom of the Parish ==
The following people and military units have received the Freedom of the Parish of Thornton.

=== Individuals ===
- The Reverend Canon Katherine "Kath" Rogers: 18 June 2021.

== See also ==
- Listed buildings in Thornton, Merseyside
