= Sefton Dunes =

The Sefton Dunes are located on the Sefton Coast in North-West England.

Sefton Dunes may also refer to:

- Sefton Coast
- Metropolitan Borough of Sefton
- Sefton Council

or Sand Dunes & Coastal management in particular

- Dune
- Coastal management
