= Park (Sefton ward) =

Coordinates: 53.5202°N 2.9373°W

Park is a Metropolitan Borough of Sefton ward in the Sefton Central Parliamentary constituency that covers the villages of Sefton, Lunt, Lydiate and the western part of the town of Maghull, England.

== Councillors ==
Term	Councillor	Party
2023–present	Cllr. Mike Desmond F.R.C.A.	Labour Party
2014–Present	June Burns	Labour Party
2024–present	Cllr. Chloe Parker, NPQH	Labour Party

== Election results ==
=== Elections of the 2020s ===
Sefton Metropolitan Borough Council Municipal Elections 2024: Park
Party	Candidate	Votes	%	±%
Labour	Parker Chloe	1621	58%	14%
Lydiate and Maghull Community Independents	Paul Francis McCord	641	23%	−23%
Conservative	Craig Peter Titherington	274	10%	+2%
Green	Roy Greason	180	6%	+2%
Liberal Democrats	Keith William Cawdron	76	3%	
Majority		980	35%	0%
Turnout		2792	29%	−4%
Labour gain from		Swing		

Sefton Metropolitan Borough Council Municipal Elections 2023: Park
Party	Candidate	Votes	%	±%
Labour	Michael (Mike) Joseph Desmond	1436	44%	N/A
Lydiate and Maghull Community Independents	John Sayers	1320	41%	N/A
Conservative	Gregory (Greg) John William Titherington	264	8%	
Green	Roy Greason	125	4%	
Liberal Democrats	Keith William Cawdron	86	3%	
Majority		116	3%	
Turnout		3231	33%	
Labour gain from		Swing		

=== Elections of the 2010s ===
Sefton Metropolitan Borough Council Municipal Elections 2018: Park
Party	Candidate	Votes	%	±%
Labour	Cllr June Burns	1611	51%	
Independent	John Gerald Short	744	24%	
Conservative	Kenneth Michael Hughes	534	17%	
Liberal Democrats	Jen Robertson	241	8%	
Majority				
Turnout		3130	32%	
Labour hold		Swing		

Sefton Metropolitan Borough Council Municipal Elections 2016: Park
Party	Candidate	Votes	%	±%
Independent	Pat From Lydiate	1829	53%	
Labour	Andy Wilson	1431	42%	
Green	Roy Greason	174	5%	
Majority				
Turnout		3434	36%	
Independent gain from Labour		Swing		

Sefton Metropolitan Borough Council Municipal Elections 2011: Park
Party	Candidate	Votes	%	±%
Liberal Democrats	Cllr Tony Robertson	1480	37%	
Labour	Kris Brown	1411	36%	
Conservative	Alex Orme	867	22%	
Green	Roy Greason	200	5%	
Majority				
Turnout		3958	41%	
Liberal Democrats hold		Swing		

Sefton Metropolitan Borough Council Municipal Elections 2010: Park
Party	Candidate	Votes	%	±%
Liberal Democrats	Andrew Blackburn	3046	44%	
Labour	Anna McCaul	1965	28%	
Conservative	Alex Orme	1434	21%	
UKIP	Gordon Stanley Kinread	321	5%	
Green	Roy Greason	141	2%	
Majority				
Turnout		6907	72%	
Liberal Democrats hold		Swing		

Sefton Metropolitan Borough Council Municipal Elections 2012: Park
Party	Candidate	Votes	%	±%
Labour	Stephan Kermode	2027	53%	
Liberal Democrats	Robbie Fenton	1145	30%	
UKIP	Peter Gannon	304	8%	
Conservative	Martyn Barber	295	8%	
Green	Roy Greason	81	2%	
Majority		882		
Turnout		3852	40%	
Labour gain from Liberal Democrats		Swing		

Sefton Metropolitan Borough Council Municipal Elections 2011: Park
Party	Candidate	Votes	%	±%
Liberal Democrats	Cllr Tony Robertson	1480	37%	
Labour	Kris Brown	1411	36%	
Conservative	Alex Orme	867	22%	
Green	Roy Greason	200	5%	
Majority				
Turnout		3958	41%	
Liberal Democrats hold		Swing		

Sefton Metropolitan Borough Council Municipal Elections 2010: Park
Party	Candidate	Votes	%	±%
Liberal Democrats	Andrew Blackburn	3046	44%	
Labour	Anna McCaul	1965	28%	
Conservative	Alex Orme	1434	21%	
UKIP	Gordon Stanley Kinread	321	5%	
Green	Roy Greason	141	2%	
Majority				
Turnout		6907	72%	
Liberal Democrats hold		Swing		
