= Sudell (ward) =

Electoral ward of Sefton, England

Coordinates: 53.51252°N 2.92654°W

Sudell is a Metropolitan Borough of Sefton ward in the Sefton Central Parliamentary constituency that covers the eastern part of the town of Maghull including the village of Kennessee Green. The population of this ward taken at the 2011 census was 12,681.

== Councillors ==
Term	Councillor	Party
2022–Present	Judy Hardman	Labour Party
2021–Present	James Hansen	Labour Party
2023–Present	Phil Hart	Labour Party

== Election results ==
=== Elections of the 2020s ===
Sefton Metropolitan Borough Council Municipal Elections 2024: Sudell
Party	Candidate	Votes	%	±%
Labour	James Hansen	1715	59%	+6%
Lydiate and Maghull Community Independent	Joanne Elizabeth McCall	604	21%	−15%
Conservative	Daniel Robert Kirk	336	12%	+3%
Liberal Democrats	James Tattersall	104	4%	New
Independent	Paul Andrew Dunbar	128	4%	New
Independent	Marie Blease	23	1%	−1%
Majority		1,111	38%	+21%
Turnout		2910	28%	−4%
Labour hold		Swing		

Sefton Metropolitan Borough Council Municipal Elections 2023: Sudell
Party	Candidate	Votes	%	±%
Labour	Phil Hart	1761	53%	+16%
Lydiate and Maghull Community Independent	Patrick McKinley	1208	36%	New
Conservative	Daniel Robert Kirk	304	9%	+2%
Independent	Marie Blease	61	2%	New
Majority		553	17%	+10%
Turnout		3334	32%	
Labour hold		Swing		

Sefton Metropolitan Borough Council Municipal Elections 2022: Sudell
Party	Candidate	Votes	%	±%
Labour	Judy Hardman	1329	37%	
Independent	Yvonne Sayers	1065	30%	
Independent	Thomas Henry Hughes	704	20%	
Conservative	Morgan Walton	283	7%	
Liberal Democrats	Emily Baker	157	4%	
Workers Party	Paul McCord	58	2%	
Majority		264	7%	
Turnout		3596	31%	
Labour hold		Swing		

Sefton Metropolitan Borough Council Municipal Elections 2021: Sudell
Party	Candidate	Votes	%	±%
Labour	James Joseph Hansen	1766	50%	+3%
Conservative	Thomas Henry Hughes	1268	36%	+24%
Green	Alex Waring	253	8%	+3%
Workers Party	Robert John Green	209	6%	N/A
Majority		498	12%	
Turnout		3496	33%	
Labour hold		Swing		

=== Elections of the 2010s ===
Sefton Metropolitan Borough Council Municipal Elections 2019: Sudell
Party	Candidate	Votes	%	±%
Labour	Patrick McKinley	1393	47%	
Independent	Michael O' Hanlon	653	22%	
Conservative	Thomas Hughes	347	12%	
Liberal Democrats	Stuart Fox	216	7%	
UKIP	Denis Malkin	200	7%	
Green	Marion Wykes	150	5%	
Majority				
Turnout		2959	27%	
Labour hold		Swing		

Sefton Metropolitan Borough Council Municipal Elections 2018: Sudell
Party	Candidate	Votes	%	±%
Labour	Yvonne Sayers	1645	53%	
Independent	Michael O' Hanlon	691	22%	
Conservative	Thomas Hughes	488	16%	
Liberal Democrats	Stuart Fox	214	7%	
Green	Marion Wykes	70	2%	
Majority				
Turnout		3108	31%	
Labour hold		Swing		

Sefton Metropolitan Borough Council Municipal Elections 2016: Sudell
Party	Candidate	Votes	%	±%
Independent	Matt Gannon	1230	37%	
Labour	Nina Killen	1206	37%	
Liberal Democrats	Bruce Lock Hubbard	308	9%	
UKIP	Sarah Hughes	260	8%	
Conservative	Janice Blanchard	243	7%	
Green	Carla Fox	52	2%	
Majority				
Turnout		3299	34%	
Labour hold		Swing		

Sefton Metropolitan Borough Council Municipal Elections 2015: Sudell
Party	Candidate	Votes	%	±%
Labour	Patrick McKinlay	3446	50%	
Community Action not Party Politics	Mal Gore	926	13%	
Liberal Democrats	Bruce Lock Hubbard	889	13%	
Conservative	Wendy Moore	834	12%	
UKIP	Peter Gregson	681	10%	
Green	Carla Fox	178	3%	
Majority				
Turnout		6934	70%	
Labour hold		Swing		

Sefton Metropolitan Borough Council Municipal Elections 2014: Sudell
Party	Candidate	Votes	%	±%
Labour	Adrian Owens	1551	45%	
Liberal Democrats	Cllr Bruce Lock Hubbard	776	23%	
UKIP	Tom Helsby	668	19%	
Conservative	Paul Barber	341	10%	
Green	Carla Fox	114	3%	
Majority				
Turnout		3450	35%	
Labour gain from Liberal Democrats		Swing		

Sefton Metropolitan Borough Council Municipal Elections 2012: Sudell
Party	Candidate	Votes	%	±%
Labour	Lynn Gatherer	2124	59%	
Liberal Democrats	Cllr Clifford Mainey	820	23%	
UKIP	Gordon Kinread	286	8%	
Conservative	Wendy Moore	285	8%	
Green	Andrew David Rossall	86	2%	
Majority				
Turnout		3361	36%	
Labour gain from Liberal Democrats		Swing		

Sefton Metropolitan Borough Council Municipal Elections 2011: Sudell
Party	Candidate	Votes	%	±%
Labour	Patrick Anthony McKinley	2314	53%	
Liberal Democrats	Cllr Mrs Sylvia Mainey	1169	27%	
Conservative	Wendy Moore	713	16%	
Green	Andrew David Rossall	143	3%	
Majority				
Turnout		4339	44%	
Labour gain from Liberal Democrats		Swing		

Sefton Metropolitan Borough Council Municipal Elections 2010: Sudell
Party	Candidate	Votes	%	±%
Liberal Democrats	Bruce Lock Hubbard	2636	38%	
Labour	John Inskip	2506	36%	
Conservative	Wendy Moore	1393	20%	
UKIP	Linda Elizabeth Harper	380	5%	
Green	Andrew David Rossall	100	1%	
Majority				
Turnout		7015	71%	
Liberal Democrats hold		Swing		
