= Debbie Jones =

Debbie Jones may refer to:

- Debbie Dingle, previously Debbie Jones, fictional character in Emmerdale
- Debbie Jones (athlete) (born 1958), Bermudian Olympic sprinter
- Debbie Jones-Walker (born 1953), Canadian curler

== See also ==
- Debi Jones, (born 1958) British radio and television broadcaster
- Deborah Jones (disambiguation)
