= Deborah Jones =

Deborah Jones may refer to:

- Deborah Jones, known as Debi Jones, (born 1958) British radio and television broadcaster
- Deborah Jones, screenwriter of When Innocence Is Lost
- Deborah K. Jones, American diplomat

== See also ==
- Debbie Jones (disambiguation)
- Deborah Barnes-Jones, British diplomat
