= Listed buildings in Thornton, Merseyside =

Thornton is a civil parish and a village in Sefton, Merseyside, England. It contains four buildings that are recorded in the National Heritage List for England as designated listed buildings, all of which are listed at Grade II. This grade is the lowest of the three gradings given to listed buildings and is applied to "buildings of national importance and special interest". The parish is partly residential and partly rural, and the listed buildings consist of two crosses, the bases of which are ancient, a set of stocks, and a farmhouse.

Name and location	Photograph	Date	Notes
Cross base and sundial 53.50107°N 3.00104°W		Medieval (possibly)	The oldest part is the base, and the sundial dates possibly from the 18th century. The structure is in stone and consists of a base of three square steps, and a baluster with a metal plate and a gnomon. The structure is also a scheduled monument.
Broom's Cross; 53.50523°N 2.99760°W		c. 1300	The oldest part is the base, and the cross was added in 1977 to celebrate the Silver Jubilee of Elizabeth II. The sandstone base is square with an incised cross. On the base is a granite cross in the centre of which is a quatrefoil containing a IHS monogram. On the reverse is a plaque. The structure is also a scheduled monument.
Homer Green Farmhouse; 53.51257°N 2.99602°W	—	16th century	Basically cruck-framed, the farmhouse is in stone and brick with a slate roof. It has two storeys and three bays, and is supported by two buttresses. The windows are horizontally-sliding sashes.
Stocks; 53.50108°N 3.00104°W		Late 18th or early 19th century	The stocks and the bench are in cast iron. The stocks consist of open work uprights and beams with six leg holes.
