= Maghull North railway station =

Railway station in Merseyside, England

Maghull North
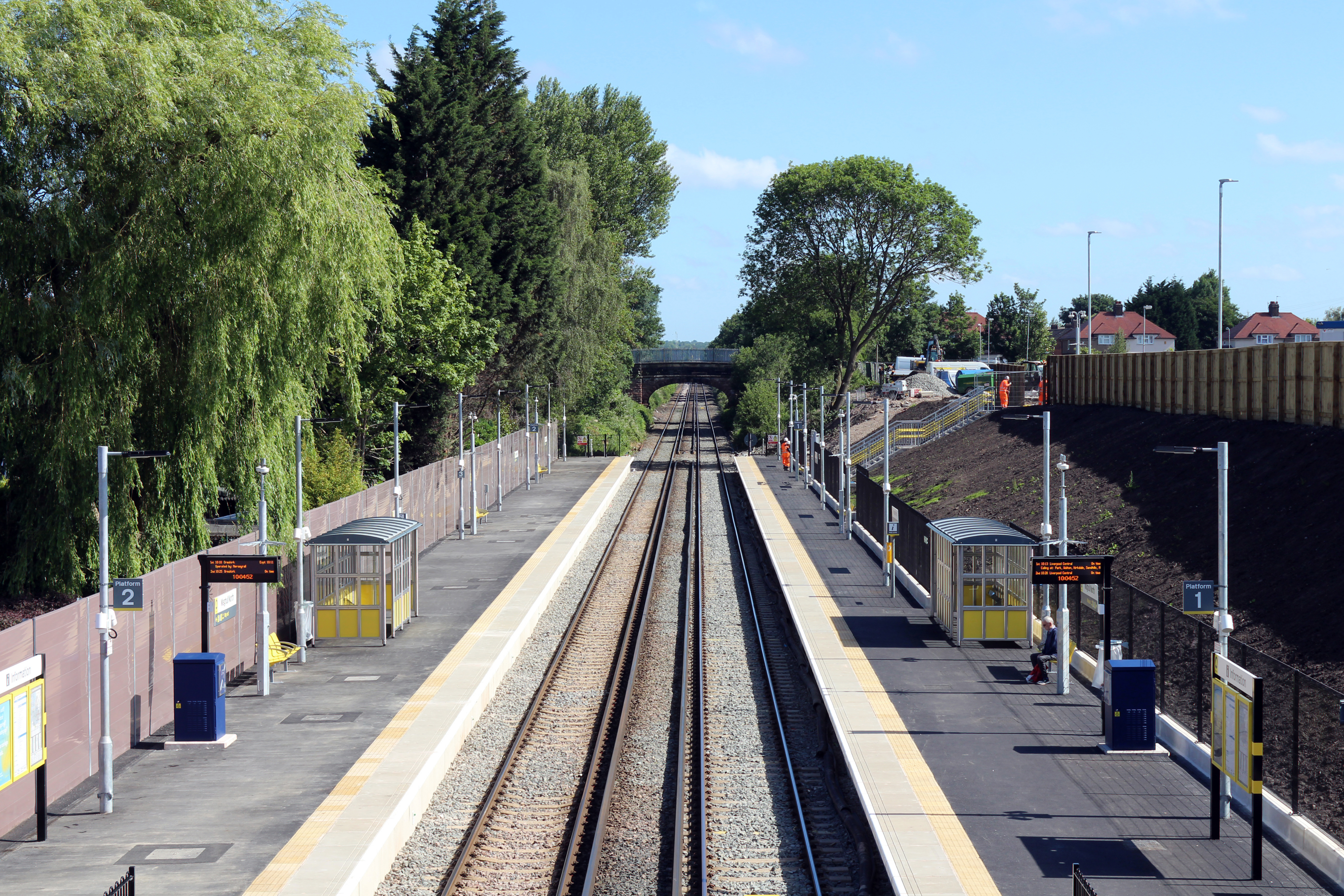

General information
- Location: Maghull, Merseyside, Sefton; England
- Coordinates: 53.5167°N 2.9213°W
- Manager: Merseyrail
- Transit authority: Merseytravel
- Platforms: 2

Other information
- Station code: MNS
- Fare zone: C3/F

Key dates
- 18 June 2018: Opened

Passengers
- 2021/22: ▲0.401 million
- 2022/23: ▲0.545 million
- 2023/24: ▲0.660 million
- 2024/25: ▼0.614 million
- 2025/26: ▲0.708 million
Location
Notes
- Passenger statistics from the Office of Rail and Road

Maghull North is a station in Maghull, Merseyside, England, on the Northern Line of Merseyrail. The station opened on 18 June 2018 to serve the north end of Maghull. The station serves as the main station for Moss Side, Ashworth Hospital and planned new housing.

== History ==
An announcement was made in December 2010 that a planned prison and proposed new railway station had been axed by Government spending cutbacks.

In June 2014, it was announced that the land would be used for housing, with the station being built as part of the project. The plan was referenced in Merseytravel's 30 Year Plan, and public comment on the proposals were opened in November 2015.

In October 2016, the Liverpool City Region Combined Authority approved the business case for the station, which was expected to cost £13 million to build. The station was planned to have two 125 m (137 yd) platforms, a 156-space car park, step-free access and provision for electric vehicle charging points, as well as connections to pedestrian, bus and cycle routes.

Sefton Council approved the planning permission for the station in January 2017, and work began on the station in September 2017. On Monday 18 June 2018, the station opened to passengers, making it the first new railway station in the region in 20 years.

== Services ==
The station is on the Ormskirk to Liverpool branch of the Northern Line. Trains run every 15 minutes during the day, Monday to Saturday. During the evening, and all day on Sundays, services run every 30 minutes.

Preceding station	National Rail	Following station
Town Green towards Ormskirk	Merseyrail; Northern Line	Maghull towards Liverpool Central
