= Listed buildings in Melling, Merseyside =

Melling is a civil parish and a village in Sefton, Merseyside, England. It contains 11 buildings that are recorded in the National Heritage List for England as designated listed buildings. Of these, one is listed at Grade II*, the middle of the three grades, and the others are at Grade II, the lowest grade. Apart from the village of Melling, the parish is rural. The listed buildings include houses, farms and associated buildings, a church and associated structures, and an ancient cross.

== Key ==
Grade	Criteria
II*	Particularly important buildings of more than special interest
II	Buildings of national importance and special interest

== Buildings ==
Name and location	Photograph	Date	Notes	Grade
Cross base and sundial 53.49529°N 2.92262°W	—	Medieval	The cross base is possibly medieval, and the sundial was added in the 18th century. They are in stone, the base being square and standing on a step. On this is a Tuscan column supporting a square abacus with a metal plate. The gnomon is missing.The cross base is also a scheduled monument	II
Melling House; 53.49651°N 2.90249°W	—	16th century (possible)	Originally a house, later used for storage, it is in stone with a stone-slate roof. It is in two storeys and four bays, the outer bays projecting forward. The windows are a mixture, some are mullioned, others are horizontally-sliding sashes, and there is a cross window. Inside are timber-framed cross walls.	II
Parsonage; 53.49623°N 2.92514°W	—	Early 17th century	The original part is in stone with a tiled roof; it is in one storey with an attic, and has a two-bay front. On the right side is a mullioned window. To the west is an 18th-century extension in rendered brick with two storeys and two bays. The windows here are 20th-century casements.	II
Bank Hall Farm; 53.50188°N 2.90000°W	—	17th century	A stone farmhouse with a slate roof. It has a T-shaped plan, is in two storeys, and has a four-bay front. The entrance is in the third bay, and most of the windows are 19th-century sashes.	II
Outbuildings, Melling House; 53.49649°N 2.90274°W	—	1652	These were possibly servants' quarters, they are in stone with a stone-slate roof. They contain mullioned windows, a blocked entrance over which is a dated lintel, and a cart entrance. To the south are pig styes.	II
Barnes Farmhouse; 53.49675°N 2.91037°W	—	1654	A stone farmhouse with a stone-slate roof, in two storeys and four bays. The first bay projects forward, is rendered, and contains a 20th-century bow window. In the angle is a porch, and there is an entrance between the third and fourth bays. The other windows are mullioned.	II*
Barn, Melling House; 53.49649°N 2.90284°W	—	1660	The barn is in stone with a stone-slate roof. It has large quoins, coped gables, and ventilation slots. There are cart entrances on the north and south sides, one of which has a date stone.	II
Wood Hall; 53.49661°N 2.93610°W	—	Late 17th century	A brick house on a stone base with stone dressings and a stone-slate roof. It has a three-bay front with a central entrance. The doorcase has an architrave, a frieze, and a pediment on consoles. Above the door is a stone carved with the royal arms and the initials "IR". The windows are sashes with wedge lintels. The associated wall is included in the listing.	II
Former Vicarage; 53.49642°N 2.91861°W	—	1831–32	The vicarage, later a private house, is in stone with a tiled roof. It has two storeys and three bays, the outer bays projecting forward and gabled. In the centre is a projecting a Tudor-headed entrance. The windows are mullioned.	II
St Thomas' Church; 53.49545°N 2.92272°W		1835	A church by J. W. Casson, extended in 1873, built in stone with roofs partly of stone-slate, and partly in tiles. It consists of a nave, a chancel with a north organ loft and a south vestry, and a west tower. The tower has an embattled parapet, and the windows are lancets. Inside the church is a west gallery on cast iron columns.	II
Churchyard wall, St Thomas' Church; 53.49567°N 2.92266°W	—	Uncertain	The wall extends around the four sides of the churchyard. It is in stone, 47 metres (154 ft) in length, and includes a lych gate. It incorporates a stone dated 1676.	II
