= Waddicar =

Coordinates: 53.4922°N 2.9124°W

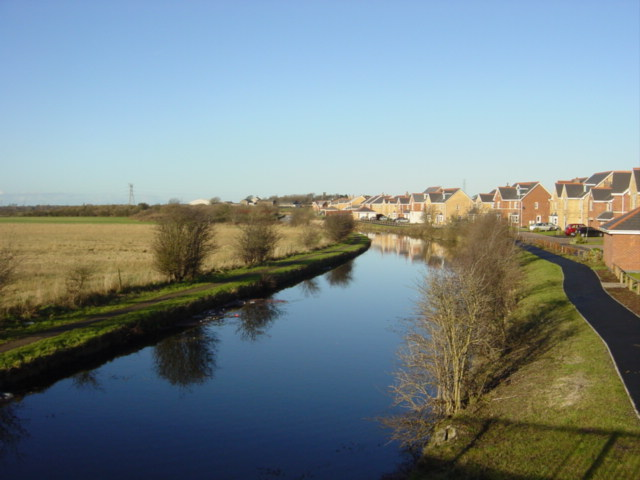
- Leeds and Liverpool Canal from Ledson's Bridge, Waddicar

- Location within Merseyside
- OS grid reference: SD385002
- Metropolitan borough: Sefton
- Metropolitan county: Merseyside
- Region: North West
- Country: England
- Sovereign state: United Kingdom
- Post town: LIVERPOOL
- Postcode district: L31
- Dialling code: 0151
- Police: Merseyside
- Fire: Merseyside
- Ambulance: North West
- UK Parliament: Sefton Central

Waddicar is the name given to an area of the Metropolitan Borough of Sefton, Merseyside, between Melling and Kirkby in the Metropolitan Borough of Knowsley.

== Transport ==
Waddicar is served by the 345 bus service operated by Arriva which runs between the town and Liverpool city centre.

There are no railway stations serving Waddicar. The nearest railway station is Kirkby railway station in the town of Kirkby, served by electric Merseyrail Northern line services to Liverpool Central railway station and, until the opening of Headbolt Lane railway station in 2023, diesel Northern Trains (previously Northern by Arriva) services to Wigan and Manchester.
