= Listed buildings in Hightown, Merseyside =

Hightown is a civil parish and a village between Formby and Crosby in Sefton, Merseyside, England. It contains four buildings that are recorded in the National Heritage List for England as designated listed buildings, all of which are listed at Grade II. This grade is the lowest of the three gradings given to listed buildings and is applied to "buildings of national importance and special interest".

Hightown was developed as a village to house commuters following the arrival of the railway in the mid 19th century. Three of the listed buildings pre-date this, and consist of a renovated wayside cross, a farmhouse, and a house that originated as a farmhouse, and the other is a war memorial.

| Name and location | Photograph | Date | Notes |
|---|---|---|---|
| Wayside cross 53.52476°N 3.05620°W | | 17th century or earlier | The wayside cross is set into the garden wall of Cross House, with iron railings in front of it. The cross was restored and parts were renewed in about 1880. It is in sandstone, the two-step plinth being original. On the plinth is a base and a modern cross shaft and head. The cross is also a scheduled monument. |
| Rose Cottage; 53.52202°N 3.05206°W | — | Early 18th century (probable) | Originally a farmhouse, it was extended in the 19th and 20th centuries. The house is in brick with a slate roof. It is in two storeys with a three-bay front, and outshuts at the rear. On the front is a 20th-century porch. The windows are casements. |
| Whitedge Farmhouse; 53.52923°N 3.05332°W | — | Late 18th century | A roughcast farmhouse with stone dressings and a slate roof that was remodelled in the 19th century. It is in two storeys and has a symmetrical three-bay front. The central round-headed doorway has imposts, a keystone, and a fanlight. The windows are casements with wedge lintels. |
| War Memorial; 53.52529°N 3.05958°W | | 1920s | The war memorial, which stands in a roundabout, was designed by Trenwith Wills with sculpture by Herbert Tyson Smith. It is on a hexagonal platform in brick and sandstone with four flights of shallow steps. The base is in ashlar stone and brick, on which is a tapering four-sided cenotaph of rusticated brick. This is surmounted by a sandstone statue of a bowed angel with folded wings. At the base of each side of the cenotaph is a slate plaque, and above the plaque on the east face is a relief including the Royal Crest, over which is a cross. The plaques carry inscriptions and the names of those lost. |
