= Listed buildings in Little Altcar =

Little Altcar is a civil parish and a village in Sefton, Merseyside, England. It contains five buildings that are recorded in the National Heritage List for England as designated listed buildings, all of which are listed at Grade II. This grade is the lowest of the three gradings given to listed buildings and is applied to "buildings of national importance and special interest". Originally rural, the parish has been partly occupied by housing. The listed buildings are farmhouses and farm buildings.

Name and location	Photograph	Date	Notes
Hoggshill Farmhouse; 53.54783°N 3.06223°W	—	c. 1600 (possible)	The farmhouse has been much altered. It is rendered with a 20th-century pantile roof, and is in a single storey with an attic. The front facing away from the street has three bays with a central porch. The windows are a mix of casements and horizontally-sliding sashes, and there are dormers at the rear.
Barn, Lovelady's Farm; 53.54646°N 3.05634°W	—	18th century	The barn is in brick with a stone-slate roof. It has various entrances, and ventilation holes in diamond patterns.
Lovelady's Farmhouse; 53.54627°N 3.05583°W	—	Late 18th century (probable)	A brick farmhouse with a slate roof, in two storeys and three bays. The entrance is in the centre, and the windows are casements. There is an extension on the right with a loading door.
Stables, Lovelady's Farm; 53.54655°N 3.05604°W	—	Early 19th century (probable)	The stables are in brick with a slate roof, in two storeys and six bays. The windows and entrances have segmental heads, and there is a first-floor loading bay. On the right side is a single-storey extension under a lean-to roof.
Pump and trough, Hoggshill Farm; 53.54780°N 3.06217°W	—	19th century	The pump and trough are in the yard of the farm. The pump is in iron, and is complete, and the trough is large and in stone.
