= Little Altcar =

Coordinates: 53°32′46″N 3°03′14″W

- Village
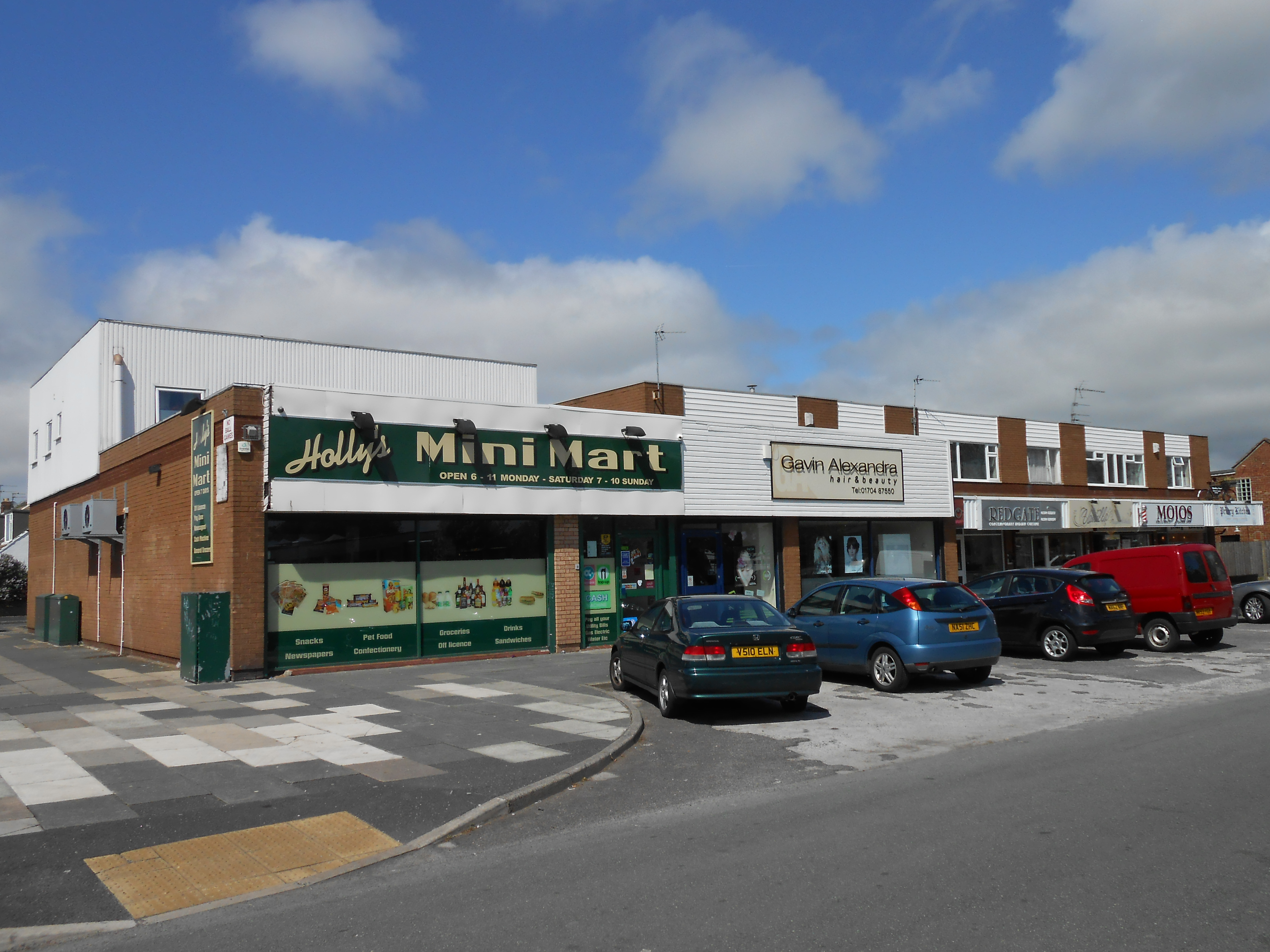
- Shops on Redgate, Little Altcar

- Location within Merseyside
- Population: 910 (2011)
- OS grid reference: SD301065
- Civil parish: Little Altcar
- Metropolitan borough: Sefton
- Metropolitan county: Merseyside
- Region: North West
- Country: England
- Sovereign state: United Kingdom
- Post town: LIVERPOOL
- Postcode district: L37
- Dialling code: 01704
- Police: Merseyside
- Fire: Merseyside
- Ambulance: North West
- UK Parliament: Sefton Central

Little Altcar is a village and civil parish in the Metropolitan Borough of Sefton on Merseyside, within the boundaries of the historic county of Lancashire and on the West Lancashire Coastal Plain of England. The village forms part of the built-up area of Formby. It had a population of 892 in the 2001 Census, increasing to 910 at the 2011 Census.

== Toponymy ==
The name Altcar is Norse meaning 'marsh by the River Alt'.

== Governance ==
=== Local Government ===
Little Altcar has two tiers of local government, at parish and metropolitan borough level: Little Altcar Parish Council, and Sefton Council. Sefton is also a constituent part of the Liverpool City Region Combined Authority.

The civil parish now called Little Altcar was created in 1974 as a result of the Local Government Act 1972, which split the former parish of Altcar between Lancashire and the new metropolitan county of Merseyside. The parts in each county became new parishes, with the parish in Lancashire taking the name Great Altcar. The parish in Merseyside was initially called simply "Altcar", changing to "Altcar-in-Merseyside" in 1977, before changing again to "Little Altcar" on 19 November 1987.

Little Altcar has seven parish councillors. For elections to Sefton Council the village is part of Ravenmeols ward which has three councillors.

=== Parliamentary representation ===
From 1950 until 2010 Little Altcar was within the boundaries of the Crosby constituency, whose MP from 1997 until 2010 was Claire Curtis-Thomas, a member of the Labour Party, prior to her election the Crosby seat was generally considered to be a safe Conservative Party stronghold with Tory MP's elected at every election barring the 1981 Crosby by-election where Shirley Williams of the Social Democratic Party was elected to represent the constituency. As a result of boundary revisions for the 2010 general election the Crosby constituency was abolished with its northern parts, including Little Altcar, being merged with the Eastern parts of Sefton that were formerly part of the Knowsley North and Sefton East constituency, to form the new constituency of Sefton Central, which is currently represented by the Labour Party MP Bill Esterson.

== See also ==
- Listed buildings in Little Altcar
- Great Altcar
