= Harington (ward) =

Electoral ward in Merseyside, England

Coordinates: 53.5569°N 3.0788°W

Harington is a ward of Metropolitan Borough of Sefton in the Sefton Central Parliamentary constituency that covers the western half of the town of Formby, including the western half of the area known as Freshfield. The ward population taken at the 2011 census was 11,780.

== Current Councillors ==
Denise Dutton 2010 to present (Conservative Party) - Deputy Leader of Conservative Group in Sefton Council.

Simon Jamieson 2015 to present (Conservative Party).

Prof Michael Pitt 2016 to present (Conservative Party).

Denise Dutton was formerly the leader of the Conservative group in Sefton Council, while Simon Jamieson was the deputy. In May 2018, Jamieson became embroiled in an online row in which he labelled a student a "lefty pleb". Shortly after, he was removed from his post as deputy, with Dutton taking his place.

== Historic Election results ==
=== Elections of the 2010s ===
Sefton Metropolitan Borough Council Municipal Elections 2018: Harington
Party	Candidate	Votes	%	±%
Conservative	Denise Dutton	1820	46%	
Labour	Carol Ann Richards	1363	35%	
FRAG	Derek Baxter	578	15%	
Liberal Democrats	Stephan McCluskie	174	4%	
Majority				
Turnout		3935		
Conservative hold		Swing		

Sefton Metropolitan Borough Council Municipal Elections 2016: Harington
Party	Candidate	Votes	%	±%
Conservative	Michael Ronald Pitt	1685	50%	
Labour	Alf Doran	1227	36%	
Green	Richard Willis	285	8%	
Liberal Democrats	Stephan McCluskie	191	6%	
Majority				
Turnout		3388		
Conservative gain from Labour		Swing		

Sefton Metropolitan Borough Council Municipal Elections 2015: Harington
Party	Candidate	Votes	%	±%
Conservative	Simon Iain Jamieson	2639	36%	
Labour	Alf Doran	1982	27%	
FRAG	Pat Gwyther	1658	23%	
UKIP	Robin Bond	639	9%	
Green	Richard Willis	399	5%	
Majority				
Turnout		7317		
Conservative hold		Swing		

Sefton Metropolitan Borough Council Municipal Elections 2014: Harington
Party	Candidate	Votes	%	±%
Conservative	Denise Dutton	1652	43%	
Labour	Tim Hale	1010	27%	
UKIP	Dave Irving	720	19%	
Green	Richard Willis	284	7%	
Liberal Democrats	Winifred Maher	136	4%	
Majority				
Turnout		3802		
Conservative hold		Swing		

Sefton Metropolitan Borough Council Municipal Elections 2012: Harington
Party	Candidate	Votes	%	±%
Labour	Nina Samantha Killen	1146	31%	
Conservative	Simon Iain Jamieson	1138	31%	
UKIP	Alf Doran	1061	29%	
Liberal Democrats	Dru Haydon	321	9%	
Majority				
Turnout		3666		
Labour hold		Swing		

Sefton Metropolitan Borough Council Municipal Elections 2011: Harington
Party	Candidate	Votes	%	±%
Conservative	Gillian Catherine Cuthbertson	2646	57%	
Labour	Ben Bentley	1519	33%	
Liberal Democrats	Dru Haydon	504	11%	
Majority				
Turnout		4669	49%	
Conservative hold		Swing		

Sefton Metropolitan Borough Council Municipal Elections 2010: Harington
Party	Candidate	Votes	%	±%
Conservative	Denise Dutton	3213	43%	
Labour	Maurice Owen Newton	1734	23%	
Liberal Democrats	Dru Haydon	1507	20%	
Independent	Eric Storey	689	9%	
UKIP	David John Jones	329	4%	
Majority				
Turnout		7472	77%	
Conservative hold		Swing		
