= Sefton Central =

UK Parliament constituency (since 2010)

Coordinates: 53.523°N 2.985°W

- County constituency for the House of Commons
- Interactive map of boundaries since 2024
- Location within North West England
- County: Merseyside
- Electorate: 74,746 (March 2020)
- Major settlements: Crosby, Formby, and Maghull

Current constituency
- Created: 2010
- Member of Parliament: Bill Esterson (Labour)
- Seats: One
- Created from: Crosby; Knowsley North & Sefton East

Sefton Central is a constituency represented since its creation in 2010 by Bill Esterson of the Labour Party. (Note: A county constituency (for the purposes of election expenses and type of returning officer)) (Note: As with all constituencies, the constituency elects one Member of Parliament (MP) by the first past the post system of election at least every five years.)

== Constituency profile ==
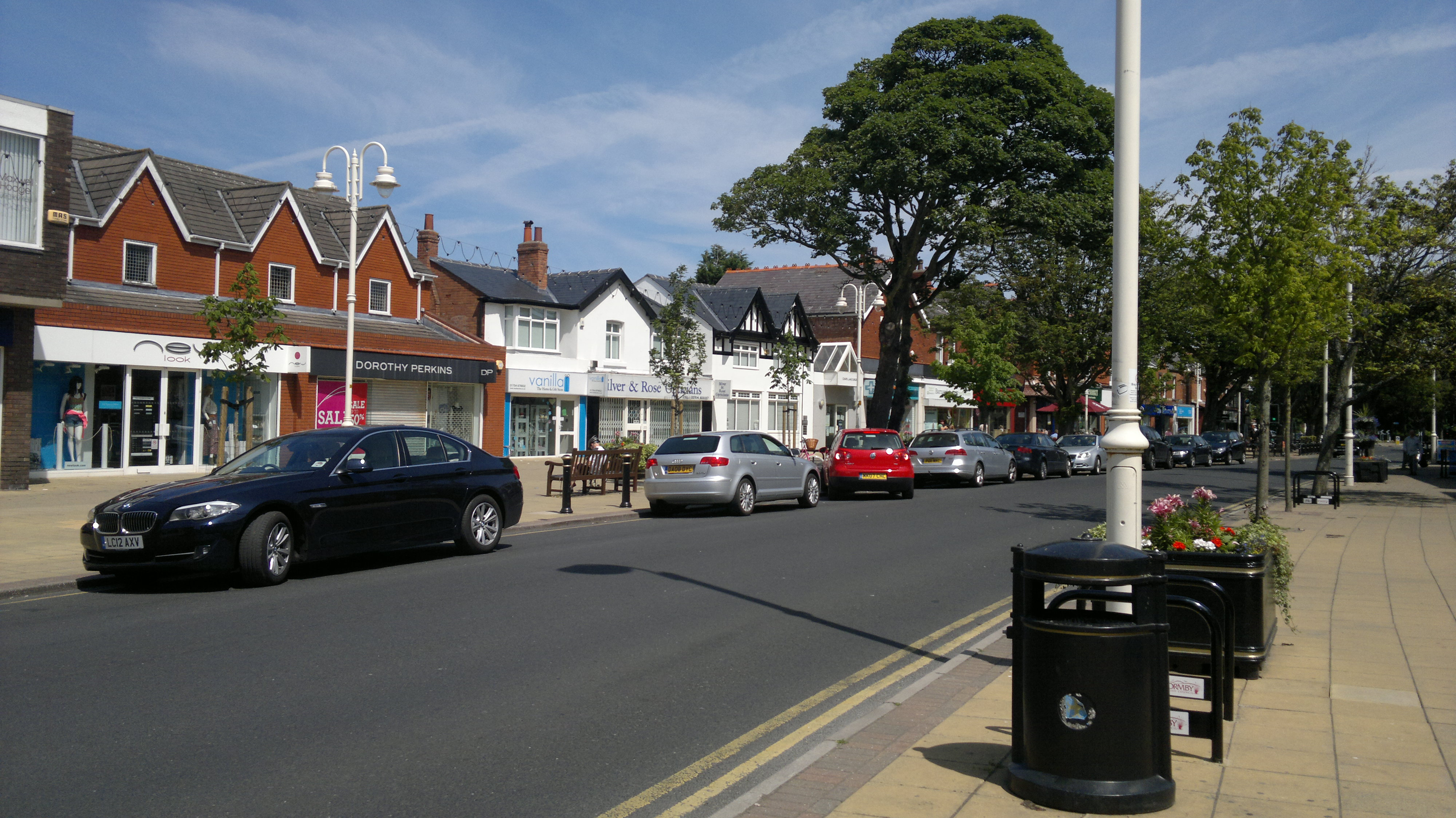
Chapel Lane, Formby

Sefton Central is a constituency in Merseyside in North West England, covering most of the Metropolitan Borough of Sefton. Its main settlements are the towns of Maghull (including Lydiate) and Formby, which both have populations of around 25,000. The constituency also covers some suburbs of nearby towns, including Ainsdale (of Southport), Waddicar (of Kirkby) and Thornton and Great Crosby (both of Crosby).

This constituency covers the towns lying to the north of Liverpool, around 8 miles (13 km) from the city centre. Maghull and Formby primarily serve as commuter towns for Liverpool; both were largely developed during the 20th century with detached and semi-detached housing estates. This is an affluent constituency mostly made up of wealthy suburban neighbourhoods. Formby is a coastal town popular with tourists for its beaches, and most of the town falls within the top 10% least-deprived areas in England. House prices across the constituency are generally lower than the UK average but higher than the rest of North West England.

Sefton Central has a low proportion of young adults and a large retired population. Residents have high levels of income and homeownership and the child poverty rate is low. Residents have average levels of education and are likely to be religious; like much of Merseyside and Lancashire, there is a large Roman Catholic population here due to historic Irish migration. A high proportion of residents work in the health, education and tourism sectors, and the percentage claiming unemployment benefits is around half the UK-wide rate. White people made up 97% of the population at the 2021 census.

Most of the constituency is represented by the Labour Party at the local borough council, with some Liberal Democrats elected in Ainsdale and localists elected in Maghull. An estimated 57% of voters in Sefton Central supported remaining in the European Union in the 2016 referendum, higher than the UK-wide figure of 48%.

== Boundaries ==
Map of 2010–2024 boundaries

=== 2010-2024 ===
The constituency was created for the 2010 general election, replacing much of Crosby along with part of Knowsley North and Sefton East.The constituency comprised the following electoral wards of the Metropolitan Borough of Sefton:

- Blundellsands
- Harington
- Manor
- Molyneux
- Park
- Ravenmeols
- Sudell

=== Current ===
Further to the 2023 review of Westminster constituencies which came into effect for the 2024 general election, the constituency was defined as being composed of the following wards of the Metropolitan Borough of Sefton (as they existed on 1 December 2020):

- Ainsdale; Blundellsands; Harington; Manor; Molyneux (polling districts C1, C2 and C3); Park; Ravenmeols; Sudell.

The Ainsdale ward was transferred from Southport, offset by the loss of the Aintree district in the Molyneux ward to Liverpool Walton.

Following a local government boundary review which did not affect the constituency boundaries, the seat comprises the following wards of the Metropolitan Borough of Sefton with effect from May 2026:

- Ainsdale; Aintree & Maghull South (excluding Aintree); Blundellsands; Formby East; Formby West; Lydiate & Maghull West; Maghull East; Thornton & Hightown.

The constituency covers Merseyside northern residential suburban areas of Crosby, Blundellsands, Brighton-Le-Sands, Little Crosby, Thornton, Hightown, Formby, Ainsdale and Maghull together with the villages and localities of Carr Houses, Freshfield, Ince Blundell, Kennessee Green, Lady Green, Little Altcar, Lunt, Lydiate, Melling, Sefton, and Waddicar, in the Metropolitan Borough of Sefton.

== History ==
This seat was contested for the first time at the 2010 general election.

At the time, eleven of the constituency's twenty-one councillors were Conservatives followed by the Liberal Democrats who had ten, (Note: A share of the vote based on the 2008 local election in these seven wards gave Conservative 42.3% Liberal Democrat 34.2% Labour 18.1%.) whereas analysis by Rallings and Thrasher indicated that had the Sefton Central constituency existed in 2005, the result would have been: Labour 45.6%, Conservative 33.6%, LibDem 19.2%, giving a Labour majority of 4,950. The Labour Party candidate's majority was 3,862 suggesting a moderate two-party swing.

The area covered by this seat and its immediate predecessor Crosby was historically a strong area for the Conservatives. However, since Labour gained that seat in the 1997 election, they have held it with fairly comfortable margins for 20 years. In 2015, an 8.1% swing to Labour saw them take the area with their biggest ever majority of 11,846 votes (24.2%), in accordance with the significant swing to Labour in Merseyside compared to 2010; this margin was surpassed in 2017, as Labour won more than 60% of the vote in the seat and a majority of over 30% for the first time. This suggests that since 2010, Sefton Central has changed from a key marginal between the major parties to a Labour safe seat.

== Members of Parliament ==
Election	Member	Party
2010	Bill Esterson	Labour

== Elections ==
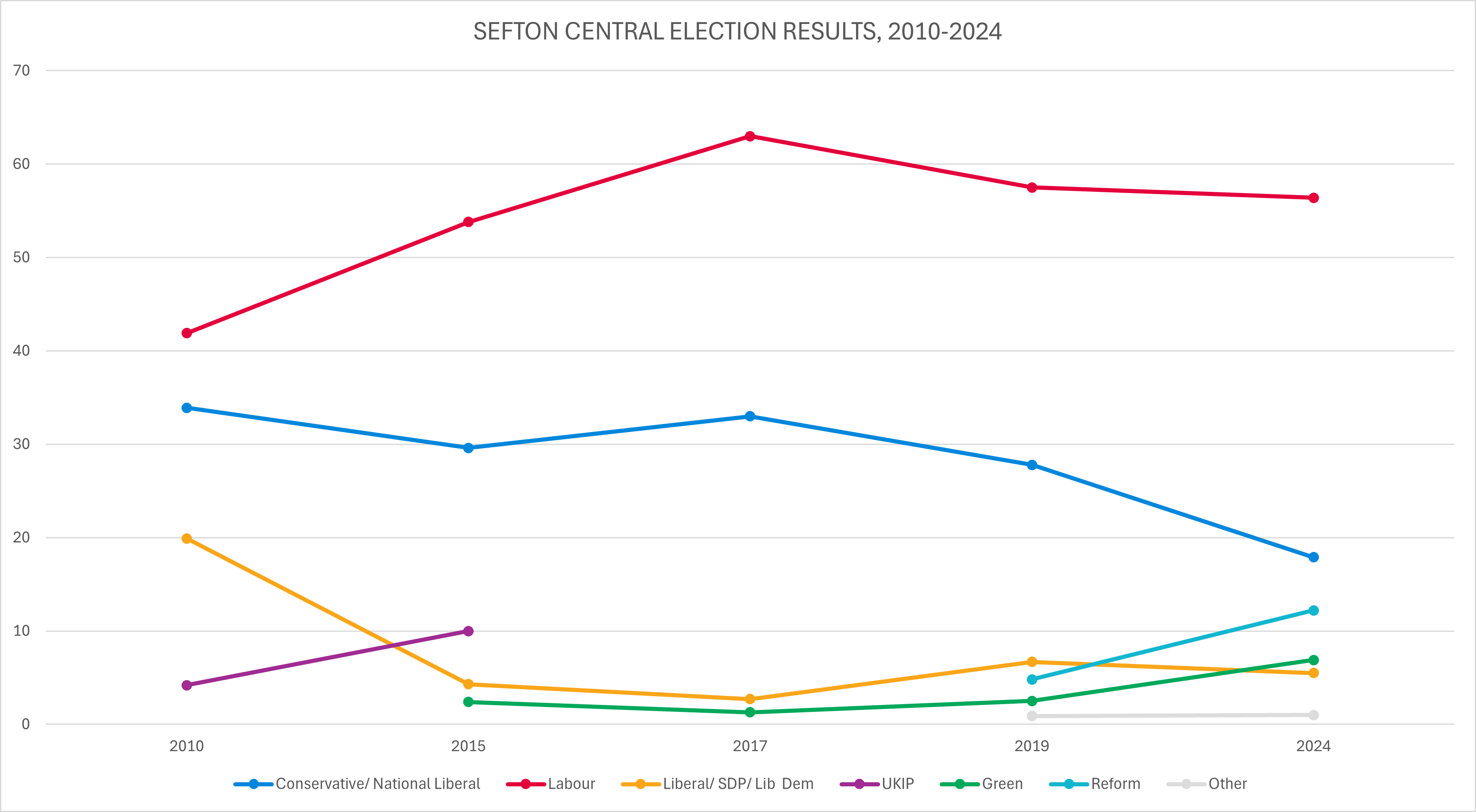
Election results 1983-2024

=== Elections in the 2020s ===
General election 2024: Sefton Central
Party	Candidate	Votes	%	±%
Labour	Bill Esterson	26,772	56.4	+3.8
Conservative	Marcus Bleasdale	8,490	17.9	−16.4
Reform	Nagender Chindam	5,767	12.2	+8.6
Green	Kieran Dams	3,294	6.9	+4.8
Liberal Democrats	Gareth Lloyd-Johnson	2,630	5.5	−1.1
Independent	Ralph James	496	1.0	N/A
Majority		18,282	38.5	+20.3
Turnout		47,449	63.9	−12.5
Labour hold		Swing	+10.1	

Changes are from the notional 2019 results on the 2024 boundaries.

=== Elections in the 2010s ===
General election 2019: Sefton Central
Party	Candidate	Votes	%	±%
Labour	Bill Esterson	29,254	57.5	–5.5
Conservative	Wazz Mughal	14,132	27.8	–5.2
Liberal Democrats	Keith Cawdron	3,386	6.7	+4.0
Brexit Party	Paul Lomas	2,425	4.8	New
Green	Alison Gibbon	1,261	2.5	+1.2
Liberal	Angela Preston	285	0.6	New
Renew	Carla Burns	137	0.3	New
Majority		15,122	29.7	–0.3
Turnout		50,880	72.9	–2.6
Labour hold		Swing	–0.1	

General election 2017: Sefton Central
Party	Candidate	Votes	%	±%
Labour	Bill Esterson	32,830	63.0	+9.2
Conservative	Jade Marsden	17,212	33.0	+3.4
Liberal Democrats	Daniel Lewis	1,381	2.7	–1.6
Green	Mike Carter	656	1.3	–1.1
Majority		15,618	30.0	+5.8
Turnout		52,079	75.5	+3.1
Labour hold		Swing	+2.9	

General election 2015: Sefton Central
Party	Candidate	Votes	%	±%
Labour	Bill Esterson	26,359	53.8	+11.9
Conservative	Valerie Allen	14,513	29.6	–4.3
UKIP	Tim Power	4,879	10.0	+5.8
Liberal Democrats	Paula Keaveney	2,086	4.3	–15.6
Green	Lindsay Melia	1,184	2.4	New
Majority		11,846	24.2	+16.2
Turnout		49,021	72.4	+0.6
Labour hold		Swing	+8.1	

General election 2010: Sefton Central
Party	Candidate	Votes	%	±%
Labour	Bill Esterson	20,307	41.9	–3.7
Conservative	Debi Jones	16,445	33.9	+0.4
Liberal Democrats	Richard Clein	9,656	19.9	+0.7
UKIP	Peter Harper	2,055	4.2	+3.5
Majority		3,862	8.0	−4.1
Turnout		48,463	71.8	+11.0
Labour hold		Swing	+2.0	

== See also ==
- List of parliamentary constituencies in Merseyside
