= Meols (ward) =

Electoral ward in Sefton, England

Coordinates: 53.66601°N 2.95635°W

Meols is a Metropolitan Borough of Sefton ward in the Southport Parliamentary constituency that covers the localities of Churchtown and Crossens in the north end of the town of Southport. The population of this ward taken at the 2011 census was 12,425.

== Councillors ==
| Term | Councillor | Party |
|---|---|---|
| 1991–Present | John Dodd | Liberal Democrats |
| 2014–Present | Daniel Lewis | Liberal Democrats |
| 2019–Present | Yaso Sathiy | Liberal Democrats |

== Election results ==
=== Elections of the 2010s ===
Sefton Metropolitan Borough Council Municipal Elections 2016: Meols
| Party | Candidate | Votes | % | ±% |
|---|---|---|---|---|
| Liberal Democrats | John Dodd | 1635 | 51% | |
| Labour | Debbie Bannon | 510 | 16% | |
| UKIP | Katy Bonney | 458 | 14% | |
| Conservative | Luke Anthony Thompson | 535 | 17% | |
| Green | Sarah-Jayne McIntosh | 86 | 3% | |
| Majority | | 1,100 | 34% | |
| Turnout | | 3224 | 33.2% | |
| Liberal Democrats hold | | Swing | | |

Sefton Metropolitan Borough Council Municipal Elections 2015: Meols
| Party | Candidate | Votes | % | ±% |
|---|---|---|---|---|
| Liberal Democrats | Nigel Ashton | 2065 | 32% | |
| Conservative | Georgia Pactor | 1733 | 26% | |
| UKIP | Patricia Elaine Shanks | 1375 | 21% | |
| Labour | Debbie Bannon | 1141 | 17% | |
| Green | Rick Furness | 237 | 4% | |
| Majority | | | | |
| Turnout | | 6551 | | |
| Liberal Democrats hold | | Swing | | |

Sefton Metropolitan Borough Council Municipal Elections 2014: Meols
| Party | Candidate | Votes | % | ±% |
|---|---|---|---|---|
| Liberal Democrats | Joanne Barton | 1177 | 34% | |
| UKIP | Pat Shanks | 976 | 28% | |
| Conservative | Adam Webster | 303 | 18% | |
| Labour | Maureen Stoker | 332 | 9% | |
| Independent | Margaret Brown | 227 | 8% | |
| Green | Graham Bentley | 117 | 3% | |
| Majority | | | | |
| Turnout | | 3509 | | |
| Liberal Democrats hold | | Swing | | |

Sefton Metropolitan Borough Council Municipal Elections 2012: Meols
| Party | Candidate | Votes | % | ±% |
|---|---|---|---|---|
| Liberal Democrats | John Dodd | 1327 | 40% | |
| Conservative | Sarah Jackson | 600 | 18% | |
| Labour | Maureen Stoker | 560 | 17% | |
| Independent | Margaret Brown | 489 | 15% | |
| UKIP | Patricia Elaine Shanks | 372 | 11% | |
| Majority | | | | |
| Turnout | | 3348 | | |
| Liberal Democrats hold | | Swing | | |

Sefton Metropolitan Borough Council Municipal Elections 2011: Meols
| Party | Candidate | Votes | % | ±% |
|---|---|---|---|---|
| Liberal Democrats | Nigel Roy Ashton | 1211 | 31% | |
| Conservative | Chris Cross | 1136 | 29% | |
| Labour | Maureen Stoker | 711 | 18% | |
| Independent | Margaret Brown | 628 | 16% | |
| UKIP | Patricia Elaine Shanks | 278 | 7% | |
| Majority | | | | |
| Turnout | | 3964 | 41% | |
| Liberal Democrats hold | | Swing | | |

Sefton Metropolitan Borough Council Municipal Elections 2010: Meols
| Party | Candidate | Votes | % | ±% |
|---|---|---|---|---|
| Liberal Democrats | David Rimmer | 3202 | 49% | |
| Conservative | Chris Cross | 1989 | 30% | |
| Labour | Maureen Stoker | 561 | 9% | |
| Independent | Margaret Brown | 329 | 5% | |
| UKIP | Patricia Elaine Shanks | 313 | 5% | |
| BNP | Max Blair | 183 | 3% | |
| Majority | | | | |
| Turnout | | 6577 | 68% | |
| Liberal Democrats hold | | Swing | | |
