= Kennessee Green =

Coordinates: 53.5065°N 2.93121°W

- Village
- Location within Merseyside
- OS grid reference: SD383014
- Metropolitan borough: Sefton
- Metropolitan county: Merseyside
- Region: North West
- Country: England
- Sovereign state: United Kingdom
- Post town: LIVERPOOL
- Postcode district: L31
- Dialling code: 0151
- Police: Merseyside
- Fire: Merseyside
- Ambulance: North West
- UK Parliament: Sefton Central

Kennessee Green is a village in the southern half of Maghull in Metropolitan Borough of Sefton, Merseyside, England. Kennessee Green has two churches: St Andrew's Church and St. George's Church. The village of Kennessee Green is situated around Maghull railway station, St Andrew's Church and the former epileptic homes located around Damfield Lane and Deyes Lane. The village also contains two high schools, Deyes High School and Maricourt High School.

== History ==
Historically in Lancashire, Kennessee Green grew when the Liverpool, Ormskirk and Preston Railway was founded. Wealthy families moved from Liverpool to the area and lived in the large Victorian houses around Tree View Court and Maghull railway station. By 1901, Kennessee Green was significantly larger than Maghull itself, and was connected to Maghull through various narrow roads.

During the 20th century, Kennessee Green and Maghull both grew with housing estates being built which consequently connected the areas together. The new housing estates did not respect the historic street patterns of both of the villages. In 1974, Kennessee Green and Maghull were moved from the West Lancashire Rural District in the administrative and ceremonial county of Lancashire and placed into the newly formed Metropolitan Borough of Sefton in the also newly formed ceremonial county of Merseyside.

There are no signs to mark Kennessee Green as it is contiguous with Maghull.

== Shopping ==
Kennessee Green has no significant centre but it has a small busy row of shops called Tree View Court referred to as Station Shops, they are located on the junction of Station Road and Tailors Lane and one block from the railway station and the Great Mogul Pub. Tree View Court includes a newsagent, a pharmacy, and a One Stop convenience store amongst other shops.

== Transport ==
Kennessee Green includes Maghull railway station, with services to Liverpool and Ormskirk operated by Merseyrail. Kennessee Green is also close to Switch Island, one of the largest junctions in the Merseyside area, with the M57 and M58 motorways nearby. And the A59 is situated to the west of the village, connecting Maghull and Kennessee Green with Liverpool, Aintree, Litherland, Preston and Ormskirk.
