= Holy Family Catholic High School, Thornton =

Holy Family Catholic High School

Location
- Thornton, Merseyside; England
- Coordinates: 53.499°N 2.996°W

Information
- Type: Voluntary aided school
- Religious affiliation: Roman Catholic
- Local authority: Sefton
- Department for Education URN: 104962 Tables
- Ofsted: Reports
- Headteacher: Matthew Symes
- Age: 11 to 18
- Enrolment: ~900
- Website: www.holyfamilyhighschool.co.uk

Holy Family Catholic High School is a Catholic comprehensive school situated in Thornton, Merseyside, England, catering for mixed pupils aged 11–18. The current intake at the school is 885, of which 156 are aged 16–18 pursuing further education in the school's own sixth form, with student attainment Year 13 above average in 2004, compared with all sixth forms nationally.

== History ==
Holy Family converted from a secondary modern to a comprehensive during the late 1970s, and was formerly known as St Joseph's. The catchment area for pupils during the 1970s and 1980s was predominantly from the nearby towns of Formby, Freshfield and Crosby. This was the nearest RC High School that these pupils could attend after leaving junior school. Many pupils now come from areas such as Bootle and Seaforth and fewer come from Formby due to improvements made by the schools there.

The school was victim of an arson attack in 1994, with the culprits believed to have gained access via a boarded up window. An art room suffered mostly smoke damage, with fire fighting crews on site for around two hours.

=== Redevelopment proposals ===
Reports in 1992 suggested that a developer was interested in buying the school's site, which would involve relocating the school to an alternate location nearby. The school's governors noted that a meeting had taken place with a developer interested in redeveloping the grounds and demolishing the existing school, which was considered by the governing body as lacking in facilities and only barely adequate. Several months later in late 1992, the development plans had been announced as being withdrawn, following opposition by over a thousand campaigners against plans to build a supermarket on the site. The proposals had been expected to be refused permission by Sefton Council within 24 hours if they had gone through to the decision stage. Opposition was also raised regarding the proposed new site for the school, which was designated greenbelt land.

The following year, the Crosby Herald reported of Sainsbury's intention to move from the nearby Crosby Village to a new store on the school's site, with contracts having already been signed with developers. The retailer announced that they intended upon purchasing the site if the school could find a suitable alternate location, subject to planning permission being granted. The planning chief of Sefton Council remarked his intention to oppose any application from Sainsbury's, given the council's policy of not developing upon greenbelt land.

=== 21st century ===
Matthew Symes is the School's headteacher, a position that he has held since September 2012. In June 2014, the new School Dance Studio opened.
