= Manor (Sefton ward) =

Electoral ward in Merseyside, England

Coordinates: 53.510°N 3.031°W

Manor is a Metropolitan Borough of Sefton ward in the Sefton Central Parliamentary constituency that covers the localities of Thornton, Little Crosby, and Hightown. The population of the ward taken at the 2011 census was 12,497.

== Councillors ==
Term	Councillor	Party
2008–Present	John Gibson	Liberal Democrats
2010–Present	Steve McGinnity	Labour Party
2011–Present	Diane Edith Roberts	Labour Party

== Election results ==
=== Elections of the 2010s ===
Sefton Metropolitan Borough Council Municipal Elections 2011: Manor
Party	Candidate	Votes	%	±%
Labour	Diane Edith Roberts	2324	54%	
Conservative	Cllr Martyn Barber	1538	36%	
Liberal Democrats	James Philip Ludley	468	11%	
Majority				
Turnout		4330	45%	
Labour gain from Conservative		Swing		

Sefton Metropolitan Borough Council Municipal Elections 2010: Manor
Party	Candidate	Votes	%	±%
Labour	Steve McGinnity	2678	40%	
Conservative	Simon Iain Jamieson	1906	29%	
Liberal Democrats	Andrew John Shields	1733	26%	
UKIP	Joseph Graeme Hedgecock	305	5%	
Majority				
Turnout		6622	68%	
Labour gain from Conservative		Swing		
