= Maghull railway station =

Railway station in Liverpool, England

Maghull
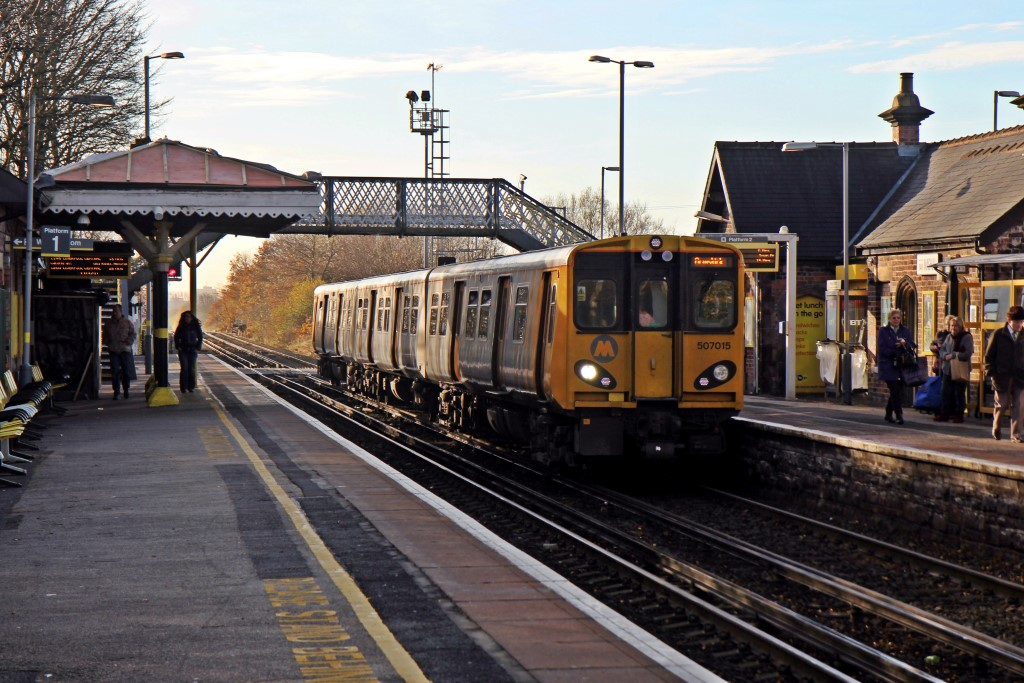
- Maghull railway station, from the Liverpool platform

General information
- Location: Maghull, Sefton; England
- Coordinates: 53.5064°N 2.9311°W
- Grid reference: SD383015
- Manager: Merseyrail
- Transit authority: Merseytravel
- Platforms: 2

Other information
- Station code: MAG
- Fare zone: C3
- Classification: DfT category E

History
- Original company: East Lancashire Railway
- Pre-grouping: Lancashire and Yorkshire Railway
- Post-grouping: London, Midland and Scottish Railway

Key dates
- 2 April 1849: Station opened

Passengers
- 2021/22: ▲1.106 million
- 2022/23: ▲1.165 million
- 2023/24: ▲1.229 million
- 2024/25: ▲1.300 million
- 2025/26: ▲1.482 million
Location
Notes
- Passenger statistics from the Office of Rail and Road

Maghull railway station is a railway station in Maghull, a suburb of Liverpool, England. It is situated on the Ormskirk branch of the Northern Line of the Merseyrail network.

== History ==
The railway line between Walton Junction (near Liverpool) and Lostock Hall (near Preston) was proposed by the Liverpool, Ormskirk and Preston Railway, and was authorised by Act of Parliament on 18 August 1846. In October 1846, the company was leased to the East Lancashire Railway, which opened the line on 2 April 1849; among the original stations was that at Maghull.

Maghull was the last station on this branch in Merseyside before the county boundary with Lancashire, until Maghull North station opened in 2018.

Frank Hornby, the designer of Hornby model railways, lived in the Maghull area he based the design for all railway stations for small towns and villages in the Hornby Trainset on Maghull station.

== Facilities ==
There is a 275-space car park situated on the site. There is also a taxi rank at the station, toilets, a shelter on the Ormskirk platform and a heated indoor shelter on the Liverpool platform. The staffed ticket booth (open from start to end of service) is located in the M to GO shop on the Ormskirk platform and there is an automatic ticket machine on the Liverpool platform. Train running information is provided by digital display screens, automated announcements and timetable posters. Step-free access is available to both platforms. There is a cycle rack for six cycles and secure cycle storage for 34 cycles.

== Services ==
Trains operate between Ormskirk and Liverpool Central every 15 minutes during Monday to Saturday daytimes, and every 30 minutes in the evening and all day Sunday. The station is at street level and two small ramps provide access to the platforms. There is a level crossing at the south end (the only one on the Walton Junction to Ormskirk section) and a pedestrian footbridge linking each platform.

== Honours and awards ==
Maghull was the 2024 recipient of the World Cup of Stations, awarded by the Rail Delivery Group. The focus of the 2024 competition was "the variety of businesses found at railway stations".

== Gallery ==
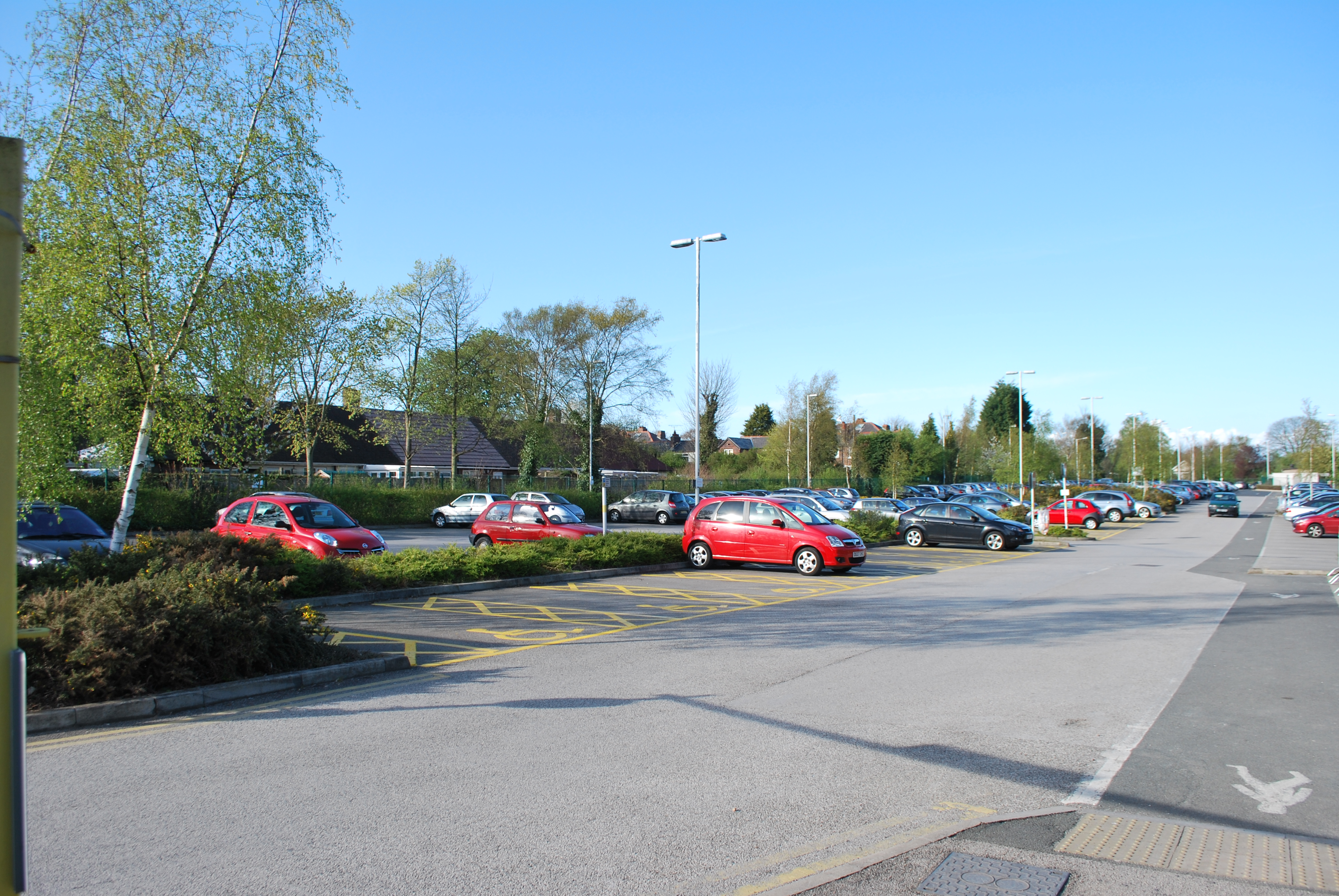
The car park at the station.

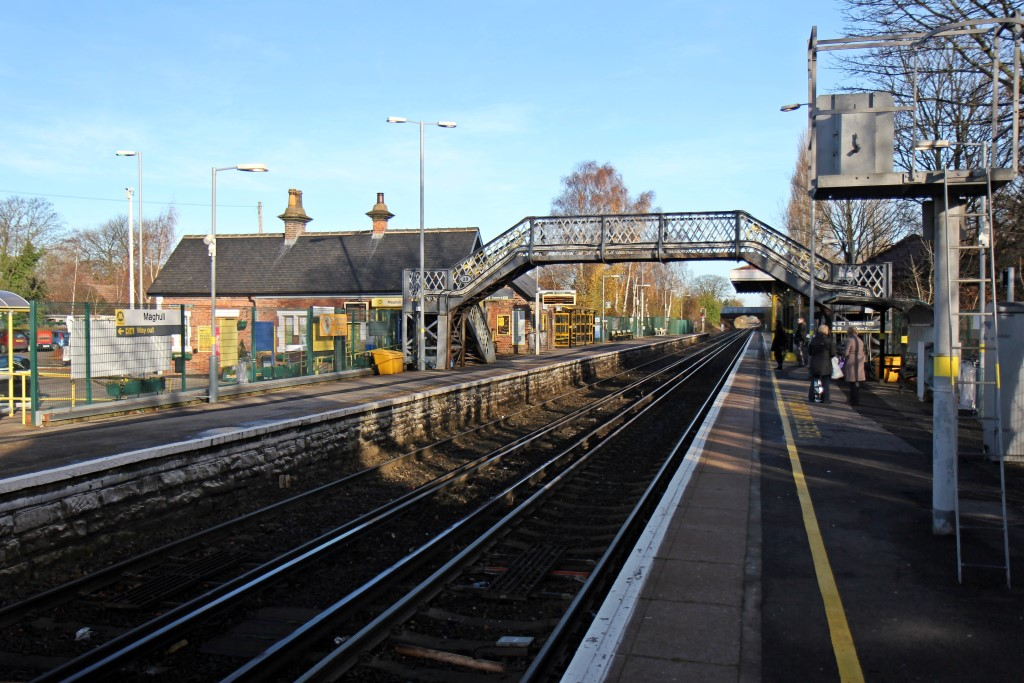
The station platforms and footbridge.

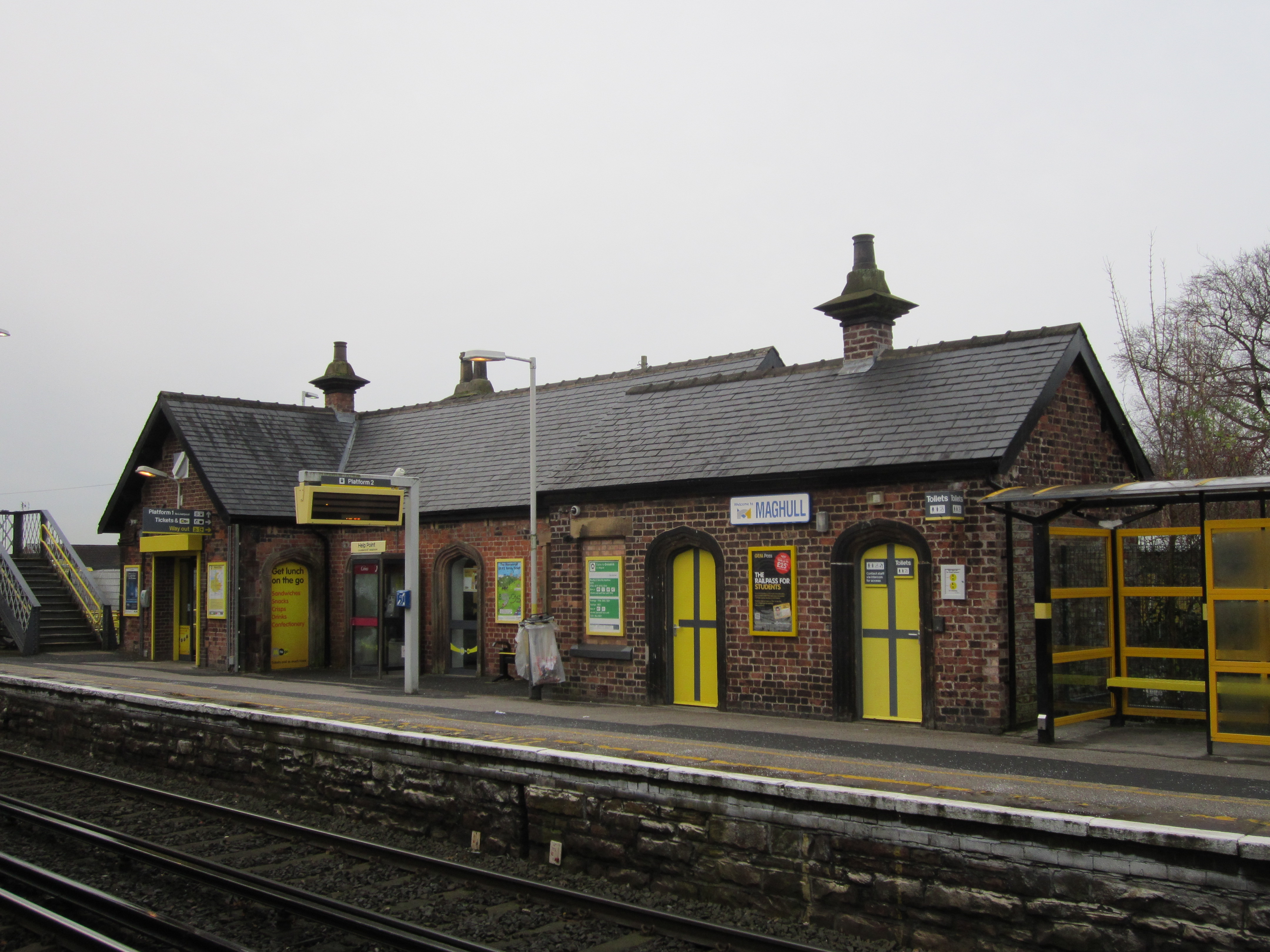
The station building, viewed from the platform.

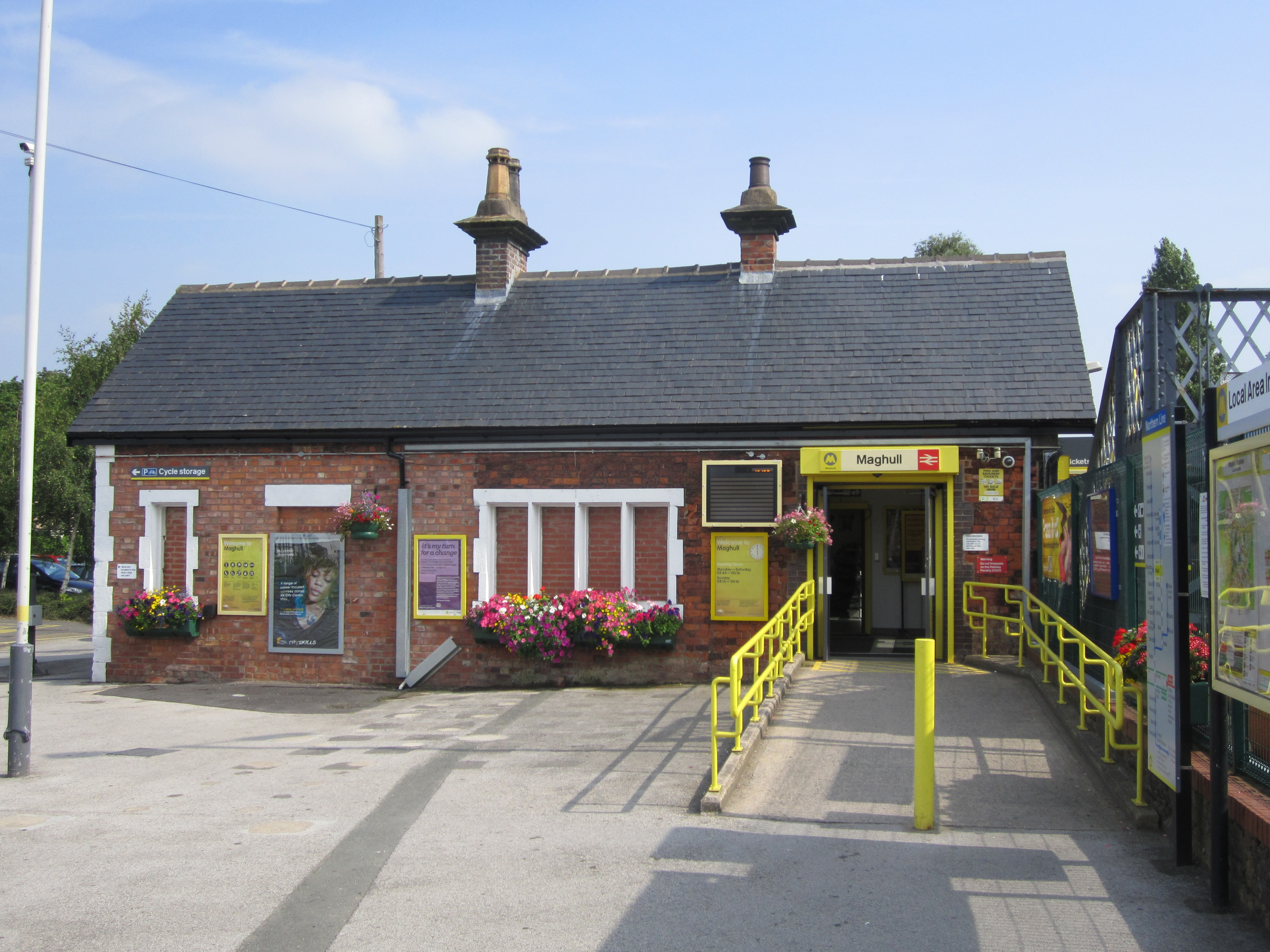
The station building, viewed from the car park.

| Preceding station | National Rail | Following station |
|---|---|---|
| Maghull North towards Ormskirk | Merseyrail; Northern Line | Old Roan towards Liverpool Central |
