= Lunt =

Coordinates: 53.5082°N 2.9851°W

- Village
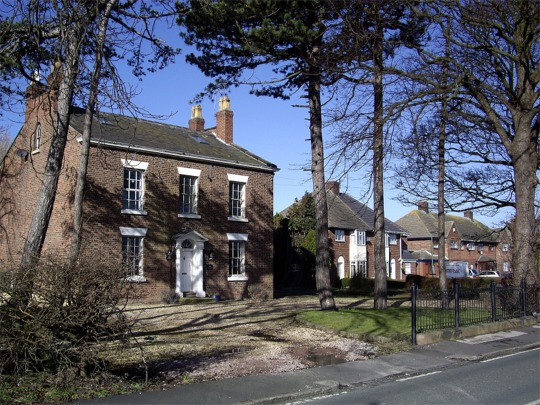
- Old house, Lunt

- Location within Merseyside
- OS grid reference: SD3491802708
- Civil parish: Sefton
- Metropolitan borough: Sefton
- Metropolitan county: Merseyside
- Region: North West
- Country: England
- Sovereign state: United Kingdom
- Post town: LIVERPOOL
- Postcode district: L29
- Dialling code: 0151
- Police: Merseyside
- Fire: Merseyside
- Ambulance: North West
- UK Parliament: Sefton Central

Lunt is a small village in the civil parish of Sefton, in the borough of Sefton in Merseyside, England, close to Sefton Village and to the west of Maghull and is in the L29 postcode.

== History ==
The name derives from either the Old Norse word Lundr or the Old Swedish word lunder, both meaning "grove" or "copse". This was likely a reference to the remnants of a large ancient forest that existed in the area at the time the settlement was founded. The town was first documented in 1251 in the Chartulary of Cockersand Abbey, where it was referred to as "de Lund". However, earlier settlement have been discovered through recent archaeological excavations at Lunt Meadows which were commissioned and funded by the Environment Agency, supported by National Museums Liverpool ahead of the transformation of farmland in the Alt valley, Sefton into a wetland reserve and flood alleviation scheme. These excavations found settlement buildings dating back to the Mesolithic period (5800 BC) when the inhabitants were still living as hunter-gatherers

== Governance ==
From 1997 until 2010 the village of Lunt was part of the Knowsley North and Sefton East constituency represented by George Howarth, a Labour Party MP. As a result of boundary revisions for the 2010 general election the Knowsley North and Sefton East constituency was abolished with Sefton East, including Lunt, being merged with the northern parts of the former Crosby constituency, which was also abolished, to form the new Sefton Central constituency which is represented by the Labour Party MP Bill Esterson.

For elections to Sefton Council the village of Lunt is within the Park electoral ward and is represented by three councillors.

Lunt was formerly a township in the parish of Sefton, in 1866 Lunt became a civil parish, on 1 April 1932 the parish was abolished and merged with Sefton. In 1931 the parish had a population of 87.

== See also ==
- Listed buildings in Sefton, Merseyside
