= L postcode area =

Postcode area within the United Kingdom

Liverpool
- Postcode area
- Coordinates: 53.443°N 2.926°W
- Country: United Kingdom
- Postcode area: L
- Postcode area name: Liverpool
- Post towns: 4
- Postcode districts: 65
- Postcode sectors: 581
- Postcodes (live): 20,440
- Postcodes (total): 43,224
- Statistics as at May 2020

The L postcode area, also known as the Liverpool postcode area, is a group of postcode districts in North West England. Together they cover central and southern Merseyside, southern West Lancashire, and a small part of north-west Cheshire. Its four post towns are Bootle, Liverpool, Ormskirk, and Prescot.

In 1999 the L postcodes on the Wirral Peninsula (L41 to L49 and L60 to L66) were transferred to the CH postcode area.

Mail for the L postcode area is processed at Warrington Mail Centre, along with mail for the CW, WA and WN postcode areas.

== Coverage ==
The approximate coverage of the postcode districts:

Postcode district	Post town	Coverage	Local authority area(s)
L1	LIVERPOOL	City centre	Liverpool
L2	LIVERPOOL	City centre	Liverpool
L3	LIVERPOOL	City centre, Everton, Vauxhall	Liverpool
L4	LIVERPOOL	Anfield, Kirkdale, Walton	Liverpool
L5	LIVERPOOL	Anfield, Everton, Kirkdale, Vauxhall	Liverpool
L6	LIVERPOOL	Anfield, city centre, Everton, Fairfield, Kensington, Tuebrook	Liverpool
L7	LIVERPOOL	City centre, Edge Hill, Wavertree, Fairfield, Kensington	Liverpool
L8	LIVERPOOL	City centre, Dingle, Toxteth	Liverpool
L9	LIVERPOOL	Aintree, Fazakerley, Orrell Park, Walton	Liverpool, Metropolitan Borough of Sefton
L10	LIVERPOOL	Aintree, Fazakerley, Kirkby	Sefton, Liverpool, Metropolitan Borough of Knowsley
L11	LIVERPOOL	Clubmoor, Croxteth, Gillmoss, Norris Green	Liverpool
L12	LIVERPOOL	Croxteth, West Derby	Liverpool
L13	LIVERPOOL	Clubmoor, Old Swan, Stoneycroft, Tuebrook	Liverpool
L14	LIVERPOOL	Broadgreen, Dovecot, Knotty Ash, Page Moss	Liverpool, Knowsley
L15	LIVERPOOL	Wavertree	Liverpool
L16	LIVERPOOL	Broadgreen, Bowring Park, Childwall	Liverpool, Knowsley
L17	LIVERPOOL	Aigburth, St Michael's Hamlet, Sefton Park	Liverpool
L18	LIVERPOOL	Allerton, Mossley Hill	Liverpool
L19	LIVERPOOL	Aigburth, Garston, Grassendale	Liverpool
L20	BOOTLE	Bootle, Orrell	Sefton
L20	LIVERPOOL	Kirkdale	Liverpool
L21	LIVERPOOL	Ford, Litherland, Seaforth	Sefton
L22	LIVERPOOL	Waterloo	Sefton
L23	LIVERPOOL	Blundellsands, Brighton-le-Sands, Crosby, Little Crosby, Thornton	Sefton
L24	LIVERPOOL	Hale, Speke	Halton, Liverpool
L25	LIVERPOOL	Belle Vale, Gateacre, Halewood, Hunts Cross, Woolton	Liverpool, Knowsley
L26	LIVERPOOL	Halewood	Liverpool, Knowsley
L27	LIVERPOOL	Netherley	Liverpool
L28	LIVERPOOL	Stockbridge Village	Liverpool, Knowsley
L29	LIVERPOOL	Lunt, Sefton	Sefton
L30	BOOTLE	Bootle, Netherton	Sefton
L31	LIVERPOOL	Lydiate, Maghull, Melling, Waddicar	Sefton
L32	LIVERPOOL	Kirkby	Knowsley
L33	LIVERPOOL	Kirkby	Knowsley
L34	PRESCOT	Knowsley, Prescot	Knowsley
L35	PRESCOT	Prescot, Rainhill, Whiston	Knowsley
L36	LIVERPOOL	Huyton, Roby, Tarbock	Knowsley
L37	LIVERPOOL	Formby, Great Altcar, Little Altcar	Sefton, West Lancashire
L38	LIVERPOOL	Hightown, Ince Blundell	Sefton, West Lancashire
L39	ORMSKIRK	Aughton, Ormskirk	West Lancashire
L40	ORMSKIRK	Burscough, Holmeswood, Mawdesley, Scarisbrick, Rufford	West Lancashire, Chorley
L67	LIVERPOOL	Littlewoods Pools	non-geographic
L68	LIVERPOOL	Vernons Pools	non-geographic
L69	LIVERPOOL	PO boxes in central Liverpool, government departments in Liverpool and Bootle, the University of Liverpool	non-geographic
L70	LIVERPOOL	Seasonal response mail	non-geographic
L71	LIVERPOOL	American Express	non-geographic
L72	LIVERPOOL	Shop Direct	non-geographic
L73	LIVERPOOL	BT Group, large Selectapost users	non-geographic
L74	LIVERPOOL	HM Revenue and Customs (Customs and Excise)	non-geographic
L75	LIVERPOOL	HM Revenue and Customs (Inland Revenue)	non-geographic
L80	BOOTLE		non-geographic

== Map ==
L postcode area map, showing postcode districts in red and post towns in grey text, with links to nearby CH, PR, WA and WN postcode areas.

== See also ==
- Postcode Address File
- List of postcode areas in the United Kingdom
