= Hightown, Merseyside =

Coordinates: 53.5248°N 3.0583°W

Hightown
- Village
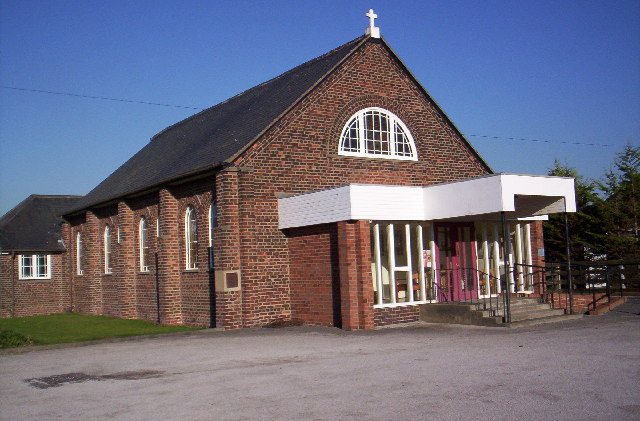
- St Stephen's Church, Hightown

- Location within Merseyside
- Population: 2,063 (2011)
- OS grid reference: SD299036
- Civil parish: Hightown
- Metropolitan borough: Sefton
- Metropolitan county: Merseyside
- Region: North West
- Country: England
- Sovereign state: United Kingdom
- Post town: LIVERPOOL
- Postcode district: L38
- Dialling code: 0151
- Police: Merseyside
- Fire: Merseyside
- Ambulance: North West
- UK Parliament: Sefton Central

Hightown is a village and civil parish in the Metropolitan Borough of Sefton in Merseyside, England, located midway between the city of Liverpool and the coastal resort of Southport. It is 8 mi (13 km) north of Liverpool city centre and is located on the coast near the boundary of the Mersey Estuary and Liverpool Bay. The River Alt joins the sea at this point and forms an estuary. There is a pumping station on the River Alt at Altmouth, built 1972, as part of a programme to alleviate flooding in the area. This is on the Altcar Rifle Range, a Territorial Army base originally established in 1860 by Lt. Col. Gladstone.

The village is featured in 'Lancashire Life' magazine, May 2004 'Tales of the sea at Hightown, near Southport' pp. 150–154 by Harold Brough, photographs by John Cocks.

== History ==
A dictionary of English Place-Names, A. D. Mills (OUP, Oxford, 1991) lists only a Hightown as a part of Congleton in Cheshire (there is also part of Banbury in Oxfordshire called Hightown). However specific books on Lancashire place names do list this Hightown in what was formerly Lancashire. Altmouth as a settlement features on many old maps prior to the 18th century, north of where the village is now, bordering Altcar parish. Alt Grange is recorded as 13th century. David Mills in his book "The place-names of Lancashire" does give High Town dated 1702. However he gives no source or reference. Understandably Mills appears to have not visited the small West Lancashire coastal village or he would not have given the description "the major town .. The name appears to be modern and self-explanatory". The first recorded mention of the place name Hightown is in Nicholas Blundell's Diaries. Nicholas Blundell's Diaries, Vol. 3 1720 (published 1972) refers to visiting High-Town Greene on the 18 May 1722 (p. 77). There is still a village green today (oddly triangular) near the pub and railway station but unlike when Nicholas Blundell visited there are no cattle pens on it. However the earliest record of the place is probably in a probate record for Richard Riding of Moorhouses in Little Crosby husbandman from 1715. Moorhouses was a hamlet on the shore where Hightown is today, it is remembered in the name of one of the modern closes. The inventory for Richard Riding's property records it as being of the property of “Richard Rydeing of the Hytown within Crosbie Parava.” High Town is recorded on Greenwood's Map of Lancashire, 1818, north east of where the village is today, approximately at the junction of Orrell Hill Lane with the modern A565

Hightown is historically part of the estate of the Blundell family of Little Crosby and many houses still pay a nominal ground rent annually to the Whitlock-Blundell estate. Hightown beach is the site of a former wartime military base known as Fort Crosby. The fort was situated midway between Hightown and Hall Road and housed a number of Italian and German POW's during WWII. Following its decommission at the end of the war a small cinema screen within the complex was reputedly used by local residents for a number of years until the camp was finally demolished in the mid-1960s. Remains of many of the buildings, pathways and fences can still be seen today.

During the early part of the 20th century the village formed its own voluntary fire service following a number of deaths and injuries resulting from the excessive time taken for the Crosby Fire Service to reach the village. The most notable of these incidents was the loss of a family during a blaze within the lighthouse which once stood close to the site of Fort Crosby. The lighthouse was built in 1839. The most prominent buildings at the turn of the 20th century were the Truant School, next to the railway line, and the Hightown Hotel (the village pub). In 1901 “There were 20 officials and 114 boys in the truant school at Hightown, belonging to the Liverpool education authority.”

Listed buildings and Second World War remains. heritagegateway.org.uk (a partnership project of English Heritage) lists Hightown Cross and three listed buildings in Hightown: the Cross itself, Whitedge Farmhouse (Alt Road) and Rose Cottage. In the immediate vicinity Moss Farmhouse, North End Lane, is also listed. Three World War Two invasion defence pillboxes can be seen near Gorsey Lane and are listed in the database, each as: Type 23 World War II concrete pillbox, constructed in the period 1940 to 1941. These are found in the Defence of Britain Archive of the Council for British Archaeology, 2002.

Listed as in poor condition (surveyed in 2000) is Coastal Battery S0011771 (Crosby Point Battery), between Coastguard Station and Hightown, north of Crosby. This is near the end of the West Lancs Golf Course, a mile south from Hightown station just off the footpath from Hall Road to Hightown. When Sefton Council upgraded the Sefton Coastal Footpath they blocked up two gun emplacements that remained of the Fort Crosby site. A former resident alleged in 2011 that Sefton Council had deliberately neglected the World War II heritage at Hightown, but there is no evidence of deliberate neglect. An exhibition by artist Tom Fairclough 'Collateral' contained peaceful but evocative pictures of the rubble that make up the sea defences at the mouth of the Alt. Fairclough documented how the rubble was the remains of houses from the destruction in Bootle in the blitz of May 1941.

The most authoritative local history reference on Hightown, Merseyside is: "My Hightown 1897 - 1969" by Joe Bulman. 1st ed. 1975. The 3rd ed. revised and enlarged by Andrew Lee-Hart and Matthew Tinker published by Sefton Libraries Corporation, Southport, 2003. This edition of the book contains 40 photographs, 2 maps & 8 appendices including personal stories of men listed on the Hightown War Memorial (Appendix 3 by Hal Giblin), and history of The Truant School (Appendix 7 by Andrew Lee-Hart).

== Transport ==
The village is served by Hightown railway station, on the Northern Line of the Merseyrail network. Services run to Southport and to Hunts Cross via Liverpool city centre. The Liverpool, Crosby and Southport Railway opened in 1848 (from Southport to Waterloo initially). It was absorbed in the Lancashire and Yorkshire Railway Company, 1850. There is also a local bus service that runs to Hall Road, located in nearby Crosby.

== Sport ==
The Blundellsands Sailing Club celebrated its centenary in 2007. The clubhouse is located on the foreshore and the post code is L38 0BU. On the beach, approximately 50 metres from the Sailing club are the remains of a three- to four-thousand-year-old forest.

Hightown also has its own sports club, the Hightown Club, which also celebrated its centenary in 2007. A brief history was written at this time and featured on the club's cricket website and in local media.

Today the Hightown Club offers sporting and social facilities for lawn bowls, cricket, squash, tennis and junior football , although in the past there have been highly successful hockey and rugby sections. The rugby section sadly folded in 2000 and men's hockey merged with Northern in the mid-1980s. The Hightown ladies hockey team were one of the country's most prominent clubs in the 1980s and 90s, when they were led by England international Maggie Souyave. Since then they have played in several locations outside the village before eventually settling at Cheshire club Bowdon.

Cricket is most prominent sport played at the club, with the 1st XI currently playing in the Premier League of the Liverpool and District Cricket Competition. The captain for the 2012 season will be Shaun Vosloo, who replaced Ian Sutcliffe following the latter's 11-year reign as skipper.

On 16 January 2011 the club was completely destroyed by a large fire due to an electrical fault near the function suite. Since the fire, all the sporting sections have been using temporary facilities and the club is planning a complete rebuild of the clubhouse, with work to commence in 2012.

== Governance ==
From 1950 until 2010 Hightown was within the boundaries of the Crosby constituency, whose MP from 1997 until 2010 was Claire Curtis-Thomas, a member of the Labour Party. Prior to her election the Crosby seat was generally considered to be a safe Conservative Party stronghold with Tory MPs elected at every election barring the 1981 Crosby by-election where Shirley Williams of the Social Democratic Party was elected to represent the constituency. As a result of boundary revisions for the 2010 general election the Crosby constituency was abolished with its northern parts, including Hightown, being merged with the eastern parts of Sefton that were formerly part of the Knowsley North and Sefton East constituency, to form the new constituency of Sefton Central, which is currently represented by the Labour Party MP Bill Esterson.

For elections to Sefton Council the village and Civil parish of Hightown is within the Manor electoral ward and is represented by three councillors. The councillors of Manor ward are Martyn Barber of the Conservative Party, John Gibson of the Liberal Democrats, and Steve McGinnity of the Labour Party.

== See also ==
- Listed buildings in Hightown, Merseyside
