= Debi Jones =

British broadcaster and politician (born 1958)

- Born: 1958 (age 67–68); Crosby, Lancashire, England, UK
- Occupations: Broadcaster, journalist, singer, councillor, actress
- Years active: 1980–present
- Spouse: Steve
- Children: Ruth

Debi Jones (born 1958) is a radio and television broadcaster, journalist, singer, politician and actress.

== Early life ==
Jones was born in Crosby, Lancashire.

== Career ==
Jones has presented shows for the BBC, Granada Television, BFBS Radio and Radio City. She presented the afternoon show on BBC Radio Merseyside during the 1980s and then presenting the BBC daytime programme People Today and the magazine show Pebble Mill at One. Jones has also maintained a television career with shopping and holiday channels in the UK.

Jones has also supported the Conservative Party, and served as a councillor in the Manor ward of Crosby. She was the Conservative candidate for Sefton Central at the 2010 UK general election, in which she came second to Labour's Bill Esterson, winning 33.9% of the vote.

Jones has acted on stage and in films. She played Micky in the film Distant Voices, Still Lives and has starred in pantomime opposite Ricky Tomlinson at the Epstein Theatre.

In January 2018, it was announced that Jones would join the new radio station Delux Radio, opposite presenters such as Mike Read and Dave Lee Travis.

== Personal life ==
Jones is married to Steve Jones; they have a daughter, Ruth.
