= Melling, Merseyside =

Coordinates: 53.495°N 2.927°W

Melling
- Village
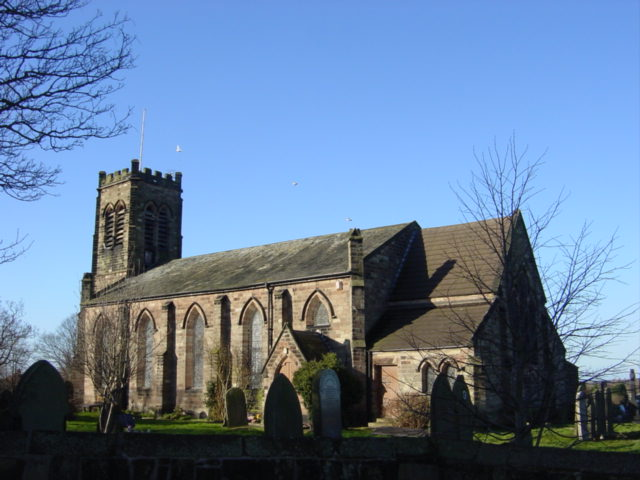
- Church of St. Thomas and the Holy Rood, Melling

- Location within Merseyside
- Population: 3,493 (2011 Census)
- OS grid reference: SD385002
- Civil parish: Melling
- Metropolitan borough: Sefton
- Metropolitan county: Merseyside
- Region: North West
- Country: England
- Sovereign state: United Kingdom
- Post town: LIVERPOOL
- Postcode district: L31
- Dialling code: 0151
- Police: Merseyside
- Fire: Merseyside
- Ambulance: North West
- UK Parliament: Sefton Central

Melling is a village and civil parish within the Metropolitan Borough of Sefton, in Merseyside, England. At the 2001 Census the population was recorded as 2,810, rising to 3,493 at the 2011 Census. Melling Rock contains a public house as well as St Thomas and the Holy Rood. The town of Waddicar, of which most of the population of Melling consists, is usually regarded as part of Melling itself and is served by the parish council which is based in the local Melling Primary School.

== Etymology ==
Historically a part of Lancashire, its name originates from the Anglo-Saxon roots for "the homestead of Maella" (or Malla). Lying close to Liverpool, the area was settled by Maella's family in the 6th century. Melling may also be derived from the Brittonic mę:l meaning "bald, bare". The village was recorded in the Domesday Book of 1086 as Melinge.

== History ==
A 'headless cross' is located in the parish church. During surveys undertaken as part of the construction of the M57 motorway, a number of anomalies were found which were concluded as being the remains of a Stone Age settlement based around Melling Rock. It is also noted that the local Wood House Farm was the location of a very minor battle during the English Civil War which was concluded from a number of cannonballs dating from the era along with Melling House, which is shown to have been seriously damaged as a result of such action, evidence of which can be found at ground level where remains of a now-destroyed defensive wall can be seen.

== Community ==
The Leeds and Liverpool Canal passes the village, and during the years of the Industrial Revolution the village flourished through passing trade. Melling is near the Aintree Grand National racecourse, which then crosses Melling Road (which actually runs from Walton to Aintree and does not go to Melling) soon after the start. There is also a Melling Steeplechase at the Grand National meeting. The local Melling Tithebarn Arts Association is based in Melling Tithebarn, which is used as an event venue. The old tithe barn serves as St Thomas' Church Hall as well as a local community centre. The Melling Residents' and Community Association (MRCA) dates from the 1930s. Originally used by the Lords of the Manor of Melling, the Molyneux, and later a builders' shed, it was given to the people of the village. The village has changed dramatically since the late 1990s with the demolition of the cable factory and the recent construction of a modern housing estate which is located in Waddicar, backing onto the Leeds-Liverpool canal.

== Places of worship ==
The parish church is a grade II listed building built in 1834 to replace an earlier chapel, and is dedicated to St Thomas and the Holy Rood. It is a part of the Maghull and Melling Team and the Diocese of Liverpool.

The Catholic church of the Most Holy Redeemer and St Kentigern was built in 1900 and is dedicated to Kentigern, patron saint of Glasgow, to reflect the origins of many of its original parishioners, and closed in 2021 during the COVID-19 pandemic.

== Transport ==
There are no railway stations serving Melling, the nearest station is Maghull serving the town of Maghull by frequent electric services from Ormskirk to Liverpool, or Kirkby, serving the nearby district of Kirkby by services from Headbolt Lane to Liverpool.

== Notable residents ==
- Will Sergeant, lead guitarist of Echo & the Bunnymen grew up here.
- Paul Rooney (artist), visual and sound artist, grew up here.
- Connor Randall Professional Footballer, Attended local school and grew up here.

== See also ==
- Listed buildings in Melling, Merseyside
