= Sefton Coast =

- Site of Special Scientific Interest
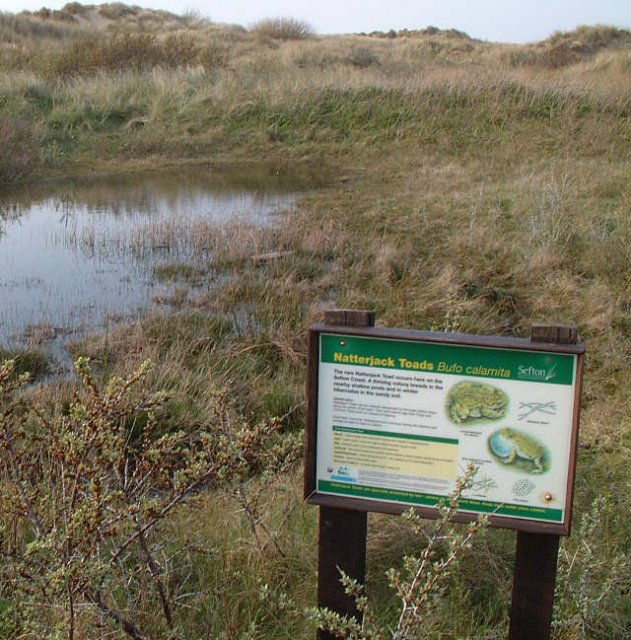

- Location within Merseyside
- Location of Sefton Coast.
- Area of search: Merseyside
- Grid reference: SD295106
- Coordinates: 53.585°N 3.061°W
- Interest: Biological and Geological
- Area: 4,605.32 ha (11,380.0 acres)
- Notification date: 16 August 2000

Sefton Coast is a 4605.3 hectare (11379.9 acre) site of special scientific interest in England which stretches for 12 miles (20 km) between Southport and Waterloo, ending with Crosby Beach. The site was notified in 2000 for both its biological and geological features. It has species such as grass of Parnassus, wild orchids, rare butterflies, sand lizards, natterjack toads and waders.

Sefton Coast includes Crosby Beach, which is also the site of an art installation by Antony Gormley, called Another Place. Further north is the Formby Point National Trust site containing pinewoods and sand dunes. The whole of the area's coastline is managed as a Special Area of Conservation (SAC) by Sefton Coast Partnership because of its important wildlife reserves. The pine woods at Victoria Road have been established as a National Trust reserve for the red squirrel, which is on the endangered species list. Formby is one of several sites in Britain where the red squirrel can still be found, although the red squirrels at Formby are now threatened by the grey squirrel.

The coast is also famous for the presence of natterjack toads in Hightown, Formby, Ainsdale and Birkdale. These are some of the few sites in England where they breed. The males' distinctive song can be heard in the late evening and is known locally as the 'Bootle Organ' or Birkdale Nightingale. In spring the males gather at the edge of shallow pools in the dune slacks and sing to attract a mate. The Sefton Coast and Countryside Service are working hard to keep these pools from becoming grown over so that they are ready each spring for this annual event.
