= Sefton, Merseyside =

Coordinates: 53.50403°N 2.97143°W

Sefton
- Village
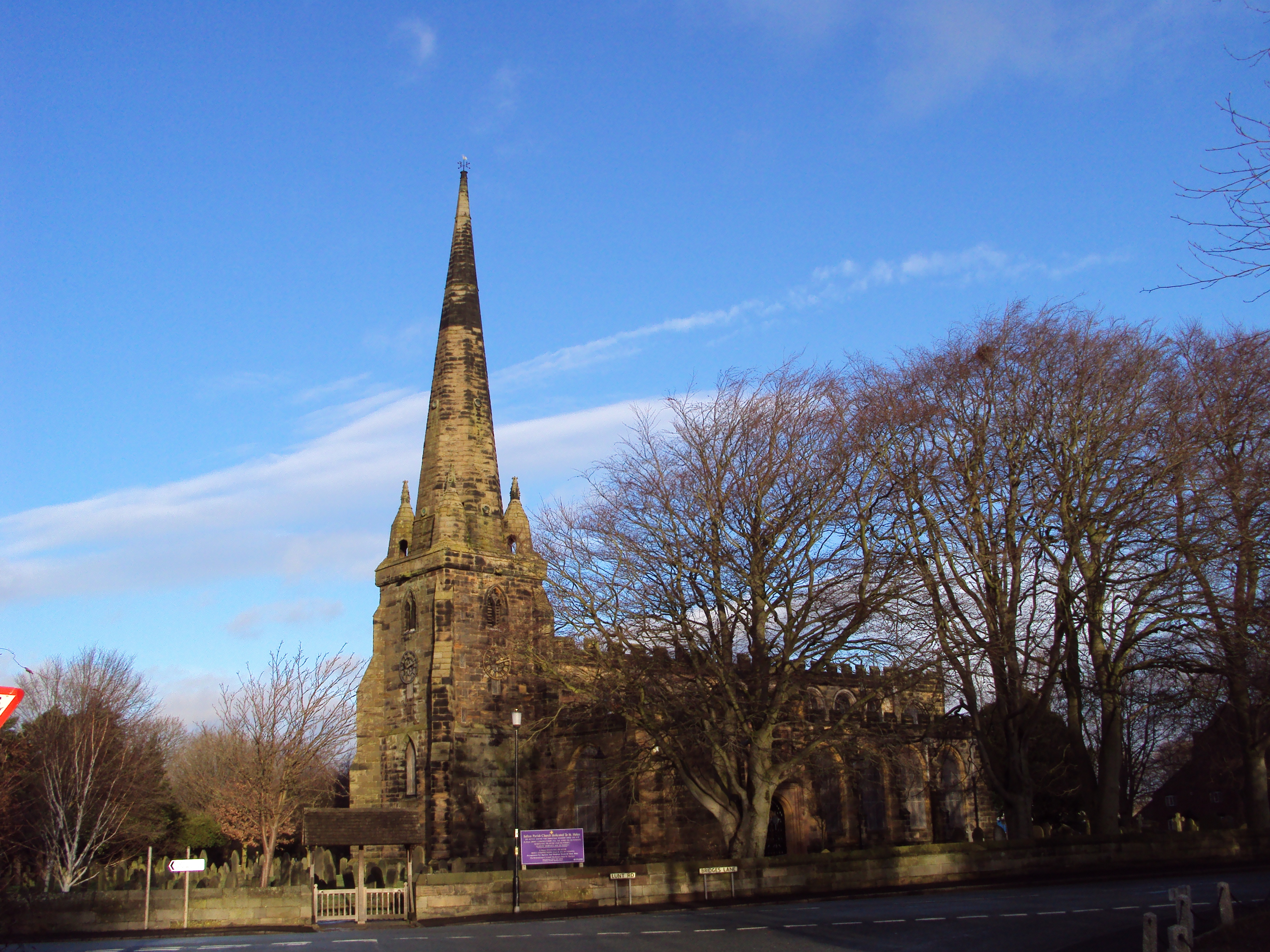
- Sefton Parish Church, dedicated to St Helen

- Location within Merseyside
- Population: 855 (2011 Census)
- OS grid reference: SD356012
- Civil parish: Sefton
- Metropolitan borough: Sefton
- Metropolitan county: Merseyside
- Region: North West
- Country: England
- Sovereign state: United Kingdom
- Post town: LIVERPOOL
- Postcode district: L29
- Dialling code: 0151
- Police: Merseyside
- Fire: Merseyside
- Ambulance: North West
- UK Parliament: Sefton Central

Sefton is a village and civil parish in the Metropolitan Borough of Sefton in Merseyside, England. Located to the south west of Maghull and to the north east of Great Crosby, it is on the flood plain of the River Alt. The village is bisected by the B5422, Brickwall Lane, which cuts also through the site of the moat of Sefton Old Hall, a recognised National Monument. At the 2001 Census the population was recorded as 772, increasing to 855 at the 2011 Census.

Historically a part of Lancashire, the name Sefton is thought to be derived from the Old Norse sef, meaning "sedge" or "rushes" and tún meaning "farmstead". In the past Sephton was an alternative spelling.

The Parish Church of St Helen (Church of England) – the only Grade I listed building in the Borough – was first built around 1170 as the private chapel of the Molyneux family.

This village is home to Sefton Parish Church, Saint Helen's Well, a pre-Reformation shrine, a plague pot, the Grade II listed "Punch Bowl Inn" and the site of Sefton Mill dating back to the Middle Ages. Local folklore has it that Sefton Hall, a Royalist stronghold, was the scene of a skirmish in the English Civil War. The Georgian Rectory to nearby Sefton Parish Church was demolished in the 1970s, however the gate piers still stand at the entrance to Glebe End. The curate's house, Lunt House, was situated in the nearby hamlet of Lunt.

== Governance ==
From 1997 until 2010 the village and civil parish of Sefton was part of the Knowsley North and Sefton East constituency represented by George Howarth, a Labour Party MP. As a result of boundary revisions for the 2010 general election the village now forms part of the new Sefton Central constituency which is represented by the Labour MP Bill Esterson.

For elections to Sefton Council the village and civil parish of Sefton is within the Park electoral ward and is represented by three councillors.

== In Art and Literature ==
In Fisher's Drawing Room Scrap Book, 1834, an engraving of a picture by Thomas Allom of the interior of the church, with a bridal couple, is accompanied by a short sketch by Letitia Elizabeth Landon in which the arrival of the groom is patiently awaited until it is learnt that he has taken fright and absconded, whereupon a young lieutenant bravely steps in and takes his place.

== See also ==
- Earl of Sefton
- Listed buildings in Sefton, Merseyside
