= Bill Esterson =

British politician

Bill Esterson MP
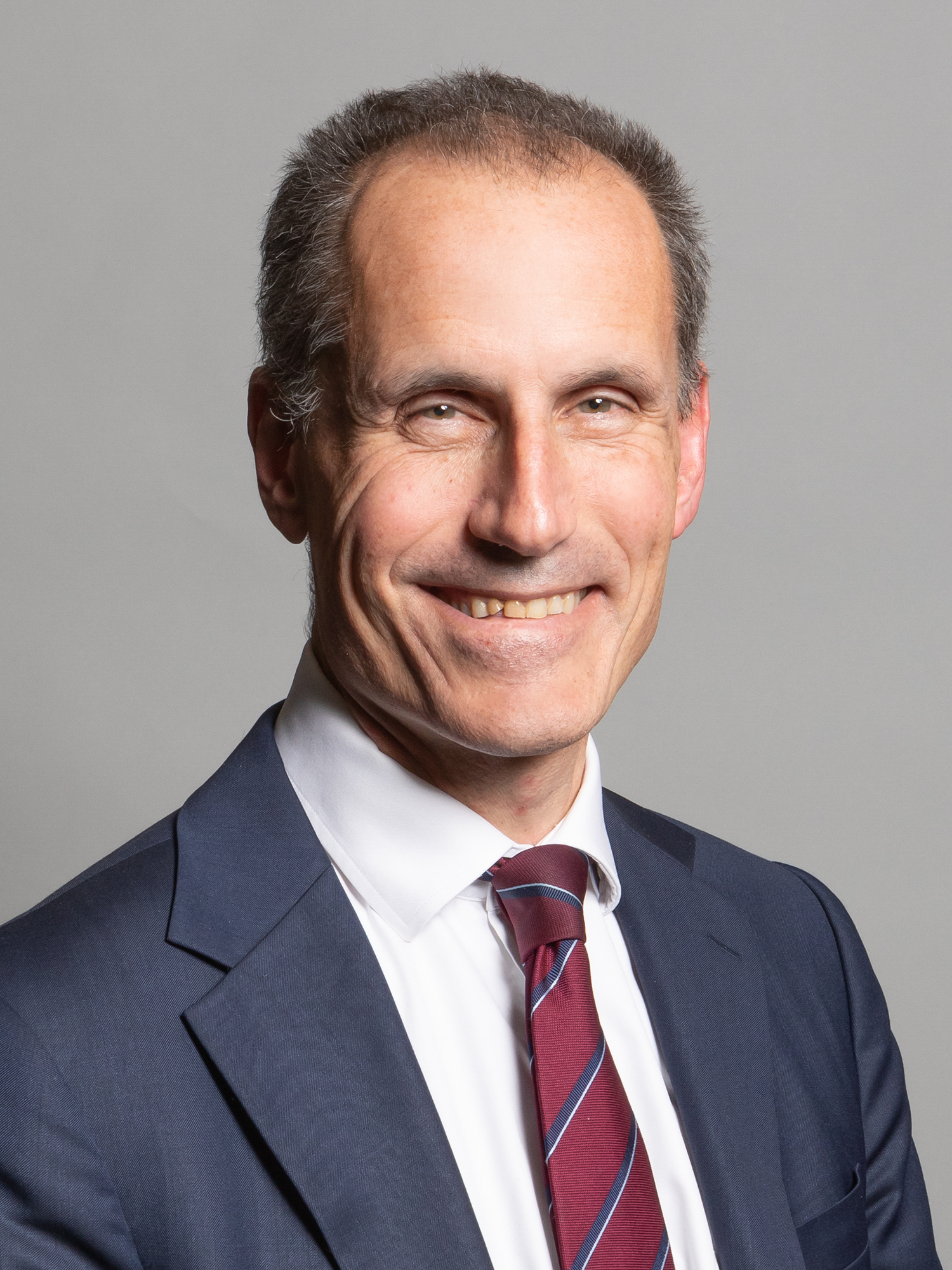
- Official portrait, 2020

Chair of the Energy Security and Net Zero Select Committee
- Incumbent
- Assumed office 11 September 2024
- Preceded by: Angus MacNeil

Shadow Minister for Roads
- In office 5 September 2023 – 5 July 2024
- Leader: Keir Starmer
- Preceded by: Gill Furniss

Shadow Minister for Business and Industry
- In office 4 December 2021 – 5 September 2023
- Leader: Sir Keir Starmer
- Preceded by: Office established
- Succeeded by: Office abolished

Shadow Minister for International Trade
- In office 18 October 2016 – 4 December 2021
- Leader: Jeremy Corbyn; Sir Keir Starmer
- Preceded by: Office established
- Succeeded by: Nia Griffith

Shadow Minister for Small Business
- In office 18 September 2015 – 9 April 2020
- Leader: Jeremy Corbyn
- Preceded by: Toby Perkins
- Succeeded by: Lucy Powell

Member of Parliament for Sefton Central
- Incumbent
- Assumed office 6 May 2010
- Preceded by: Constituency Created
- Majority: 18,282 (38.5%)

Member of Medway Council for River
- In office 1 May 2003 – 3 July 2010

Member of Medway Council for Town
- In office 1 April 1998 – 1 May 2003

Member of Rochester-upon-Medway City Council for St Margaret’s and Borstal
- In office 4 May 1995 – 31 March 1998

Personal details
- Born: William Roffen Esterson; 27 October 1966 (age 59) Kent, England
- Party: Labour
- Education: University of Leeds
- Website: Official website

William Roffen Esterson (born 27 October 1966) is a British Labour Party politician who has served as Member of Parliament (MP) for Sefton Central since 2010. He was Shadow Minister for Roads from 2023 to 2024, and was Shadow Minister for Small Business from 2015 to 2020.

== Early life and career ==
William Esterson was born on 27 October 1966. He attended Sir Joseph Williamson's Mathematical School in Rochester, Kent. He holds a joint degree in Mathematics and Philosophy from the University of Leeds. After graduation, Esterson trained with an accountancy firm and subsequently became director of a training consultancy.

Prior to his election as an MP, Esterson was a councillor for River Ward in Medway. When Medway Council was created in 1997, Esterson was elected to represent Town Ward. He represented Town Ward until 2003, when boundary changes were implemented. He was a councillor for St Margaret's and Borstal ward on Rochester-upon-Medway City Council which was dissolved to form Medway Council. During his time as a councillor, Esterson served on the Environment, Food and Rural Affairs; Education; Community and Local Government; and Treasury Select Committees.

== Parliamentary career ==
At the 2010 general election, Esterson was elected to Parliament as MP for Sefton Central with 41.9% of the vote and a majority of 3,862.

Esterson contributed to the Hillsborough debate in the House of Commons on 17 October 2011 by reading directly the words of a bereaved father. In September 2011 he contributed to the book What next for Labour? Ideas for a new generation. His chapter was entitled A Campaigning Party.

In January 2015, Esterson proposed a bill which would introduce compulsory labelling of alcoholic drinks warning about potential dangers from drinking during pregnancy.

At the 2015 general election, Esterson was re-elected as MP for Sefton Central with an increased vote share of 53.8% and an increased majority of 11,846.

He was made Shadow Minister for Small Business following Jeremy Corbyn's election as Leader of the Labour Party in September 2015. However, he supported Owen Smith in the failed attempt to replace Corbyn in the 2016 leadership election. In October 2016, he was made Shadow Minister for International Trade.

Esterson was again re-elected at the snap 2017 general election with an increased vote share of 63% and an increased majority of 15,618. At the 2019 general election, Esterson was again re-elected, with a decreased vote share of 57.5% and a decreased majority of 15,122.

Esterson endorsed Keir Starmer in the 2020 Labour leadership election. Following Starmer's victory in the contest, Esterson was sacked as Shadow Small Business Minister, but reappointed as Shadow International Trade Minister. He became Shadow Minister for Business and Industry as part of Starmer's shadow cabinet reshuffle.

In the 2023 British shadow cabinet reshuffle, he became Shadow Minister for Roads.

At the 2024 general election, Esterson was again re-elected, with a decreased vote share of 56.4% and an increased majority of 18,282.

== Personal life ==
Esterson is married with two children.

Parliament of the United Kingdom
| New constituency | Member of Parliament for Sefton Central; 2010–present | Incumbent |
