= Metropolitan Borough of Sefton =

Borough of Sefton
- Metropolitan borough
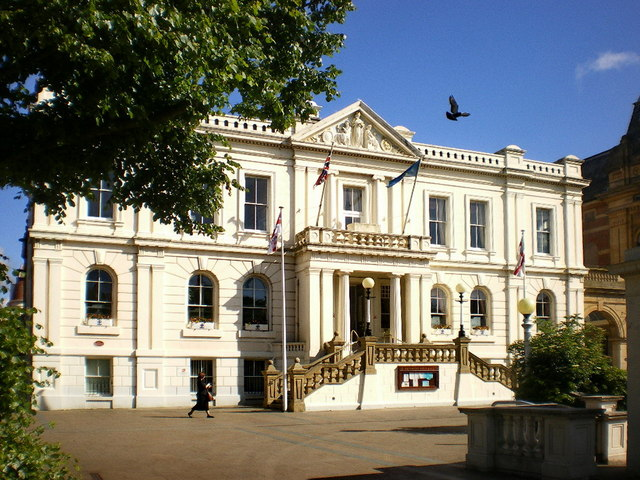
- Southport Town Hall

- Sefton shown within Merseyside
- Coordinates: 53.445°N 2.998°W
- Sovereign state: United Kingdom
- Country: England
- Region: North West
- Ceremonial county: Merseyside
- City region: Liverpool
- Incorporated: 1 April 1974
- Named for: Sefton
- Administrative HQ: Bootle and Southport

Government
  - Type: Metropolitan borough
  - Body: Sefton Council
  - Executive: Leader and cabinet
  - Control: Labour
  - Leader: Marion Atkinson (L)
  - Mayor: June Burns
  - MPs: Peter Dowd (L); Bill Esterson (L); Patrick Hurley (L)

Area
  - Total: 203 km^{2} (78 sq mi)
  - Land: 157 km^{2} (61 sq mi)
  - Rank: 164th

Population (2024)
  - Total: 286,281
  - Rank: 59th
  - Density: 1,828/km^{2} (4,730/sq mi)

Ethnicity (2021)
  - Ethnic groups: List: 95.8% White; 1.5% Asian; 1.5% Mixed; 0.5% Black; 0.7% other

Religion (2021)
  - Religion: List: 64.4% Christianity; 28.6% no religion; 0.8% Islam; 0.4% Hinduism; 0.2% Buddhism; 0.1% Judaism; 0.0% Sikhism; 0.4% other; 5.0% not stated
- Time zone: UTC+0 (GMT)
  - Summer (DST): UTC+1 (BST)
- Postcode areas: L; PR
- Dialling codes: 0151; 01704
- ISO 3166 code: GB-SFT
- GSS code: E08000014
- Website: sefton.gov.uk

The Metropolitan Borough of Sefton is a metropolitan borough of Merseyside, England. It was formed on 1 April 1974, by the amalgamation of the county boroughs of Bootle and Southport, the municipal borough of Crosby, the urban districts of Formby and Litherland, and part of West Lancashire Rural District. It consists of a coastal strip of land on the Irish Sea which extends from Southport in the north to Bootle in the south, and an inland part to Maghull in the south-east, bounded by the city of Liverpool to the south, the Metropolitan Borough of Knowsley to the south-east, and West Lancashire to the east.

It is named after Sefton, near Maghull. When the borough was created, a name was sought that would not unduly identify the borough with any of its constituent parts, particularly the former county boroughs of Bootle and Southport. The area had strong links with both the Earl of Sefton and the Earl of Derby, resident of Knowsley Hall, and the adjacent borough was subsequently named Knowsley. A Sefton Rural District covering some of the villages in the district existed from 1894 to 1932.

== Governance ==
=== Liverpool City Region Combined Authority ===
The Metropolitan Borough of Sefton is one of the six constituent local government districts of the Liverpool City Region. Since 1 April 2014, some of the borough's responsibilities have been pooled with neighbouring authorities within the metropolitan area and subsumed into the Liverpool City Region Combined Authority.

The combined authority has effectively become the top-tier administrative body for the local governance of the city region and the leader of Sefton Council, along with the five other leaders from neighbouring local government districts, take strategic decisions over economic development, transport, employment and skills, tourism, culture, housing and physical infrastructure.

In July 2015, negotiations took place between the UK national government and the combined authority over a possible devolution deal to confer greater powers on the region, including whether to introduce an elected 'Metro Mayor' to oversee the entire metropolitan area.

=== Historic controversy ===
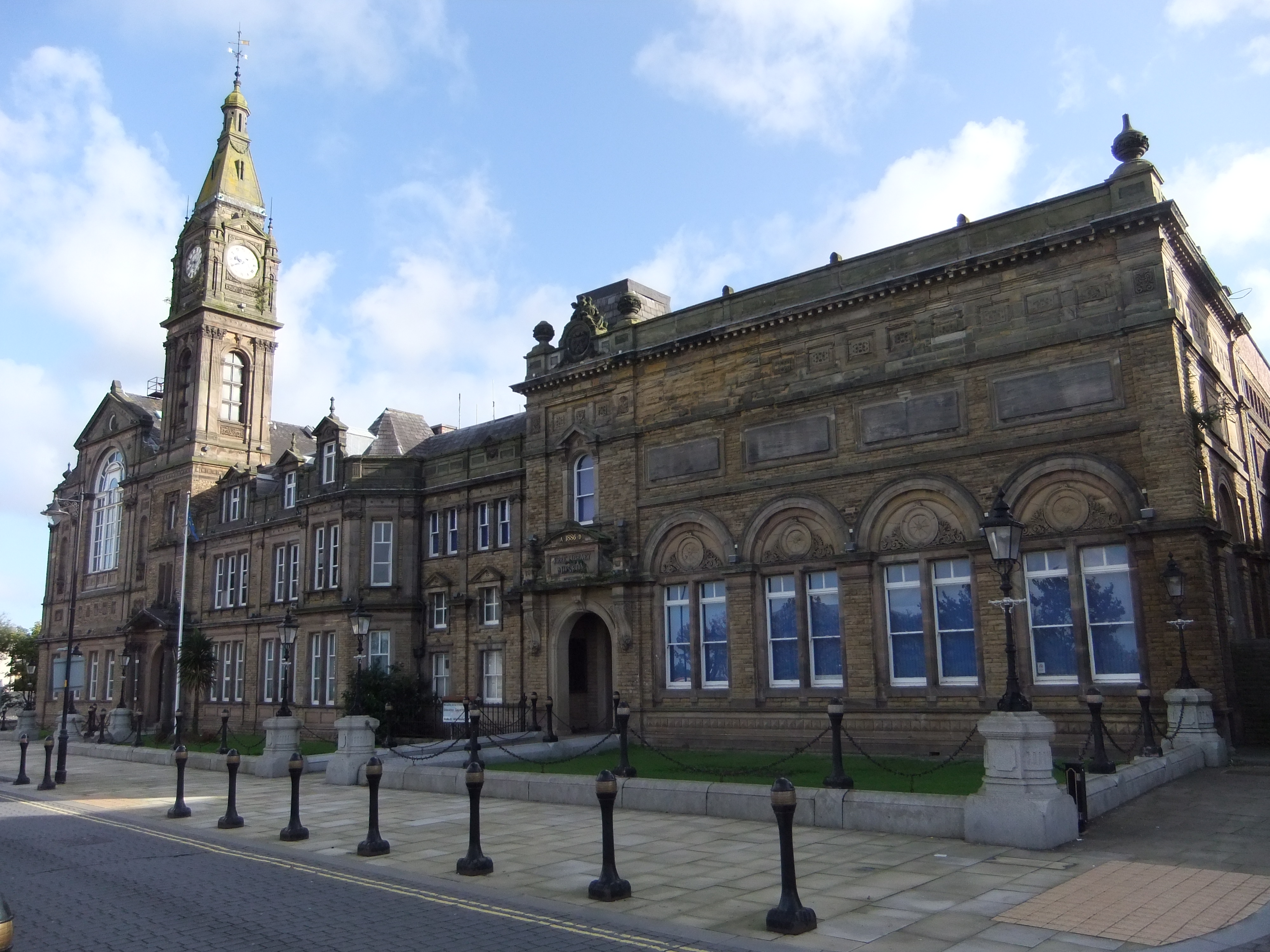
Bootle Town Hall

The existence of Sefton has been an ongoing local controversy, especially in Southport, where local Members of Parliament (MPs) and councillors have campaigned for separation from Bootle and the possible inclusion of the town as a district in the non-metropolitan county of Lancashire. It was highlighted after the 2012 local government election that different regions in Sefton had vastly different socio-economic backgrounds and needs. There are high levels of poverty around the Bootle area and central Southport.

=== Sefton Council composition ===
The council has 66 councillors, three for each of the borough's 22 wards:

- Ainsdale
- Birkdale · Blundellsands
- Cambridge · Church
- Derby · Dukes
- Ford
- Harington
- Kew
- Linacre · Litherland
- Manor · Meols · Molyneux
- Netherton and Orrell · Norwood
- Park
- Ravenmeols
- St. Oswald · Sudell
- Victoria

As of August 2025, the council is composed of 51 Labour councillors, nine Liberal Democrats, four Conservatives, one Green and one independent.

== Economy ==
In 2021, the Office for National Statistics estimated the GDP of Sefton to be £5.4 billion, with 9.8% growth in the previous year.

The majority of the Port of Liverpool is in Sefton, including a freeport. Major employers include Experian, HMRC and Shop Direct.

== Demographics ==
Ethnic Group	2001		2011	
Ethnic Group	Number	%	Number	%
White: British	273,536	96.67%	259,629	94.83%
White: Irish	2,665	0.94%	2,312	0.84%
White: Gypsy or Irish Traveller			120	0.04%
White: Other	2,339	0.83%	4,680	1.71%
White: Total	278,540	98.44%	266,741	97.43%
Asian or Asian British: Indian	604	0.21%	666	0.24%
Asian or Asian British: Pakistani	181	0.06%	127	0.04%
Asian or Asian British: Bangladeshi	257	0.09%	308	0.11%
Asian or Asian British: Chinese	903	0.32%	965	0.35%
Asian or Asian British: Other Asian	173	0.06%	653	0.24%
Asian or Asian British: Total	2,118	0.75%	2,719	0.99%
Black or Black British: African	204	0.07%	464	0.17%
Black or Black British: Caribbean	173	0.06%	223	0.08%
Black or Black British: Other Black	61	0.02%	109	0.04%
Black or Black British: Total	438	0.15%	796	0.29%
Mixed: White and Black Caribbean	476	0.17%	830	0.30%
Mixed: White and Black African	234	0.08%	488	0.18%
Mixed: White and Asian	441	0.16%	760	0.28%
Mixed: Other Mixed	433	0.15%	742	0.27%
Mixed: Total	1,584	0.56%	2,820	1.03%
Other: Arab			327	0.12%
Other: Any other ethnic group			387	0.14%
Other: Total	278	0.10%	714	0.26%
Black, Asian, and minority ethnic: Total	4,418	1.56%	7,049	2.57%
Total	282,958	100.00%	273,790	100.00%

=== Main languages ===
At the 2011 census, there were 265,010 usual residents of Sefton aged 3 or over whose main language was declared. The 10 most common main languages were as follows:

1. English 259,820 (98.04%)
2. Polish 1,579 (0.62%)
3. Chinese 415 (0.16%)
4. Portuguese 318 (0.12%)
5. Latvian 252 (0.10%)
6. Spanish 201 (0.08%)
7. Lithuanian 190 (0.07%)
8. Arabic 158 (0.06%)
9. Bengali (with Sylheti and Chittagonian) 142 (0.05%)
10. Turkish 141 (0.05%)

1,794 (0.68%) usual residents over the age of 3 had a different main language to the above languages.

== Towns and villages in Sefton ==
- Ainsdale
- Aintree
- Birkdale
- Blowick
- Blundellsands
- Bootle
- Churchtown
- Crosby
- Crossens
- Ford
- Formby
- Hightown
- Hillside
- Ince Blundell
- Kennessee Green
- Litherland
- Little Altcar
- Little Crosby
- Lunt
- Lydiate
- Maghull
- Marshside
- Melling
- Netherton
- Orrell
- Seaforth
- Sefton
- Southport
- Thornton
- Waterloo
- Woodvale

== Parliamentary constituencies ==
- Bootle
- Sefton Central
- Southport

== Sister cities ==
Sefton is twinned with:

- Gdańsk, Poland (since 1993)
- Mons, Belgium

== Freedom of the Borough ==
The following people, military units and Organisations and Groups have received the Freedom of the Borough of Sefton.

=== Individuals ===
- Donald "Ginger" McCain: 22 June 2004
- Jamie Carragher: 23 January 2006
- Alex Greenwood: 17 November 2022
- Frank Cottrell-Boyce: 13 November 2025

=== Military units ===
- 238 (Sefton) Squadron 156 Regiment Royal Corps of Transport: 6 March 1982
- 238 (Sefton) Squadron 156 (North-West) Transport Regiment Royal Logistic Corps (Volunteers): 13 April 2002
- RAF Woodvale: 3 July 2011
- HMS Mersey, RN: 17 November 2016.
- The Duke of Lancaster's Regiment: 20 June 2017

=== Organisations and groups ===
- The Southport and Ormskirk Hospital NHS Trust: 27 May 2021
- Sefton CVS (Community Voluntary Service)

== Media ==
In terms of television, the area is served by BBC North West and ITV Granada broadcasting from the Winter Hill transmitter.

The borough is served by both BBC Radio Merseyside and BBC Radio Lancashire. Other radio stations including Heart North West, Smooth North West, Dune Radio, Hits Radio Liverpool, Hits Radio Lancashire, Greatest Hits Radio Liverpool & The North West and Greatest Hits Radio Lancashire.

The area is served by the regional newspapers the Lancashire Telegraph and the Liverpool Echo. Other local newspapers are The Southport Visiter and Southport Reporter.

== See also ==
- Sefton Coast – An SSSI covering much of the borough's coastline
- St Helen's Church, Sefton
- Southport Flower Show – The UK's largest independent flower show
- List of schools in Sefton
