= List of schools in Sefton =

This is a list of schools in the Metropolitan Borough of Sefton in the English county of Merseyside.

== State-funded schools ==
=== Primary schools ===
- Ainsdale St John's CE Primary School, Ainsdale
- Aintree Davenhill Primary School, Aintree
- All Saints RC Primary School, Bootle
- Bedford Primary School, Bootle
- Birkdale Primary School, Birkdale
- Bishop David Sheppard CE Primary School, Southport
- Christ Church CE Primary School, Bootle
- Churchtown Primary School, Churchtown
- English Martyrs RC Primary School, Litherland
- Farnborough Road Infant School, Birkdale
- Farnborough Road Junior School, Birkdale
- Forefield Community Infant and Nursery School, Crosby
- Forefield Junior School, Crosby
- Freshfield Primary School, Formby
- The Grange Primary School, Bootle
- Great Crosby RC Primary School, Crosby
- Green Park Primary School, Maghull
- Hatton Hill Primary School, Litherland
- Holy Family RC Primary School, Southport
- Holy Rosary RC Primary School, Aintree
- Holy Spirit RC Academy, Bootle
- Holy Trinity CE Primary School, Southport
- Hudson Primary School, Maghull
- Kew Woods Primary School, Southport
- Kings Meadow Primary School, Ainsdale
- Lander Road Primary School, Litherland
- Larkfield Primary School, Southport
- Linacre Primary School, Bootle
- Linaker Primary School, Southport
- Litherland Moss Primary School, Litherland
- Lydiate Primary School, Lydiate
- Marshside Primary School, Marshside
- Melling Primary School, Melling
- Netherton Moss Primary School, Netherton
- Northway Primary School, Maghull
- Norwood Primary School, Southport
- Our Lady of Compassion RC Primary School, Formby
- Our Lady of Lourdes RC Primary School, Southport
- Our Lady of Walsingham RC Primary School, Netherton
- Our Lady Queen of Peace RC Primary School, Litherland
- Our Lady Star of the Sea RC Primary School, Seaforth
- Redgate Community Primary School, Formby
- Rimrose Hope CE Primary School, Seaforth
- St Andrew's CE Primary School, Maghull
- St Benedict's RC Primary School, Netherton
- St Edmund's and St Thomas' RC Primary School, Waterloo
- St Elizabeth's RC Primary School, Litherland
- St George's RC Primary School, Maghull
- St Gregory's RC Primary School, Lydiate
- St Jerome's RC Primary School, Formby
- St John Bosco RC Primary School, Maghull
- St John's CE Primary School, Crossens
- St John's CE Primary School, Waterloo
- St Luke's CE Primary School, Crosby
- St Luke's CE Primary School, Formby
- St Mary's RC Primary School, Crosby
- St Monica's RC Primary School, Bootle
- St Nicholas' CE Primary School, Blundellsands
- St Oswald's CE Primary School, Netherton
- St Patrick's RC Primary School, Churchtown
- St Philip's CE Primary School, Litherland
- St Philip's CE Primary School, Southport
- St Robert Bellarmine RC Primary School, Bootle
- St Thomas's CE Primary School, Lydiate
- St William of York RC Primary School, Crosby
- Shoreside Primary School, Ainsdale
- Springwell Park Community Primary School, Bootle
- Summerhill Primary School, Maghull
- Thomas Gray Primary School, Bootle
- Trinity St Peter's CE Primary School, Formby
- Ursuline RC Primary School, Blundellsands
- Valewood Primary School, Crosby
- Waterloo Primary School, Waterloo
- Woodlands Primary School, Formby

=== Secondary schools ===
- Birkdale High School, Birkdale
- Chesterfield High School, Crosby
- Christ the King Catholic High School, Southport
- Deyes High School, Maghull
- Formby High School, Formby
- Greenbank High School, Southport
- Hillside High School, Bootle
- Holy Family Catholic High School, Thornton
- King's Leadership Academy Hawthornes, Bootle
- Litherland High School, Litherland
- Maghull High School, Maghull
- Maricourt Catholic High School, Maghull
- Meols Cop High School, Southport
- Range High School, Formby
- Sacred Heart Catholic College, Crosby
- St Michael's Church of England High School, Crosby
- The Salesian Academy of St John Bosco, Bootle
- Stanley High School, Southport

=== Special and alternative schools ===
- Crosby High School, Crosby
- IMPACT, Bootle
- Jigsaw Primary Pupil Referral Unit, Thornton
- Merefield School, Southport
- Newfield School, Crosby
- Presfield High School, Churchtown
- Rowan Park School, Litherland

=== Further education ===
- Hugh Baird College
- King George V College
- South Sefton College
- Southport College

== Independent schools ==
=== Senior and all-through schools ===
- Merchant Taylors' Boys' School, Crosby, Crosby
- Merchant Taylors' Girls' School, Crosby
- St Mary's College, Crosby

=== Special and alternative schools ===
- Educ8 Liverpool, Seaforth
- Olsen House School, Crosby
- Peterhouse School, Churchtown
- Turning Point Academy, Bootle
