= Alex Whittle =

English footballer (born 1993)

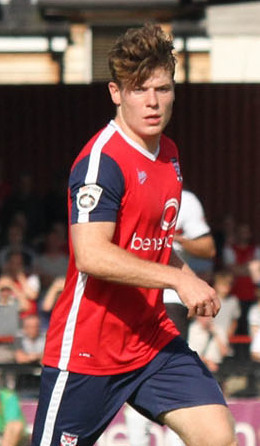
- Whittle playing for York City in 2017

Personal information
- Full name: Alex Whittle
- Date of birth: 15 March 1993 (age 33)
- Place of birth: Liverpool, England
- Height: 5 ft 9 in (1.75 m)
- Position: Left back

Team information
- Current team: Brackley Town

Youth career
- 1999–2011: Liverpool

Senior career*
Years	Team	Apps	(Gls)
2012–2015	Dunfermline Athletic	78	(1)
2015–2016	AFC Fylde	12	(0)
2016	Southport	7	(0)
2016–2018	York City	59	(0)
2018	Forest Green Rovers	2	(0)
2018	→ Southport (loan)	4	(0)
2018–2019	Warrington Town	21	(0)
2019–2020	Boston United	28	(0)
2020-2021	Gloucester City	13	(1)
2021–2022	Chesterfield	54	(5)
2022–2023	York City	34	(0)
2023–2026	Yeovil Town	92	(2)
2026	Farnborough	8	(1)
2026–	Brackley Town	0	(0)
- * Club domestic league appearances and goals as of 17:05, 9 October 2026 (UTC)

Alex Whittle (born 15 March 1993) is an English professional footballer who plays as a left-back for National League North club Brackley Town. He has played for Dunfermline Athletic, AFC Fylde, Southport, York City, Forest Green Rovers, Southport, Boston United, Gloucester City and Chesterfield.

== Club career ==
Whittle was born in Liverpool, Merseyside and attended Maricourt Catholic School in Maghull, Merseyside. He started his career at Liverpool where he joined as a six-year-old, and spent 11 years at the club before being released in early 2011. He then joined the Glenn Hoddle Academy in Spain in February 2011 and the Nike Academy for the 2011–12 season, where he went on trial to Brighton & Hove Albion, Heart of Midlothian and Dunfermline Athletic.

He joined Dunfermline Athletic on a pre-contract in April 2012 ahead of signing a three-year contract. He made his debut on 28 July in a Scottish Challenge Cup match against Forfar Athletic and his Scottish Football League debut on 11 August in a 4–0 victory against Cowdenbeath. Whittle was signed as a winger and made sporadic appearances, often as a substitute, but got his break in the first team at left-back following the redundancy of Stephen Jordan amid Dunfermline's administration. He scored his first goal for Dunfermline against Ayr United on 28 September 2013. After being released by Dunfermline at the end of 2014–15, Whittle appeared as a trialist for Hartlepool United in a friendly match against Spennymoor Town. Hartlepool manager Ronnie Moore commented that he was "pleased" with Whittle's performance, adding that he had asked Whittle to stay with the club for an extra week in order to assess him.

In September 2015, Whittle signed for National League North club AFC Fylde, making his debut as a substitute in a 2–2 draw with Tamworth. On 23 March 2016, Whittle signed for National League club Southport, debuting three days later as a 33rd-minute substitute in a 2–0 home win over Guiseley. He made seven appearances for Southport over the remainder of 2015–16.

On 23 May 2016, Whittle signed for newly relegated National League club York City on a one-year contract, with the option of a further year.

On 29 December 2017, Whittle agreed to sign for League Two club Forest Green Rovers on a free transfer on 1 January 2018. He joined National League North club Southport on 15 March 2018 on a one-month loan, having struggled with a hamstring injury after joining Forest Green. He was released by Forest Green at the end of 2017–18.

Whittle signed for Northern Premier League Premier Division club Warrington Town in September 2018 and made his debut in a 3–0 home win over South Shields on 29 September in the league. Although they would go on to win the play-offs, they were denied promotion after losing to Southern League Central playoff champions King's Lynn Town.

In June 2019, Whittle joined Boston United.

Whittle joined Gloucester City in August 2020. On 8 January 2021, he departed from Gloucester, joining Chesterfield later that day, following the path of former manager at Gloucester James Rowe and former teammates Akwasi Asante and George Carline. Whittle was released by Chesterfield at the end of the 2021–22 season.

On 2 July 2022, Whittle returned to newly promoted National League club York City.

On 3 July 2023, Whittle signed for National League South side Yeovil Town. In June 2025, he signed a one-year contract extension to his existing deal with the option of a further year. He was released by Yeovil Town at the end of the 2025–26 season.

On 25 June 2026, Whittle agreed to join National League South side, Farnborough following his release from Yeovil Town.

On 9 October 2026, the same day as his departure from Farnborough was announced, Whittle joined National League North club Brackley Town.

== International career ==
Whittle was capped by the England schools team over 2008–09.

== Career statistics ==
As of 9 October 2026

Appearances and goals by club, season and competition
Club	Season	League			National Cup (Note: Includes Scottish Cup, FA Cup)		League Cup (Note: Includes Scottish League Cup)		Other		Total	
Club	Season	Division	Apps	Goals	Apps	Goals	Apps	Goals	Apps	Goals	Apps	Goals
Dunfermline Athletic	2012–13	Scottish First Division	24	0	1	0	1	0	5 (Note: One appearance in Scottish Challenge Cup, four in Scottish First Division play-offs)	0	31	0
Dunfermline Athletic	2013–14	Scottish League One	30	1	4	1	2	0	4 (Note: One appearance in Scottish Challenge Cup, three in Scottish League One play-offs)	0	40	2
Dunfermline Athletic	2014–15	Scottish League One	24	0	3	0	1	1	0	0	28	1
Dunfermline Athletic	Total		78	1	8	1	4	1	9	0	99	3
AFC Fylde	2015–16	National League North	12	0	4	1	—		2 (Note: Appearances in FA Trophy)	0	18	1
Southport	2015–16	National League	7	0	—		—		—		7	0
York City	2016–17	National League	41	0	2	0	—		5	0	48	0
York City	2017–18	National League North	18	0	2	0	—		0	0	20	0
York City	Total		59	0	4	0	—		5	0	68	0
Forest Green Rovers	2017–18	League Two	2	0	—		—		1 (Note: Appearance in EFL Trophy)	0	3	0
Southport (loan)	2017–18	National League North	4	0	—		—		—		4	0
Warrington Town	2018–19	Northern Premier Division	21	0	3	0	—		3 (Note: Two appearances in Northern Premier playoffs and one in the National League North promotion decider)	0	27	0
Boston United	2019–20	National League North	28	0	6	0	—		2 (Note: 2 appearances in National League North Play Offs)	0	36	0
Gloucester City	2020–21	National League North	13	1	1	0	—		2	0	16	1
Chesterfield	2020–21	National League	19	1	0	0	—		1 (Note: Appearance(s) in National League play-offs)	0	20	1
Chesterfield	2021–22	National League	35	4	4	0	—		2	0	41	4
Chesterfield	Total		54	5	4	0	—		3	0	60	5
York City	2022–23	National League	34	0	2	0	—		2	0	38	0
Yeovil Town	2023–24	National League South	33	1	4	0	—		1	0	38	1
Yeovil Town	2024–25	National League	34	1	0	0	—		1	0	35	1
Yeovil Town	2025–26	National League	25	0	1	0	—		2	0	28	0
Yeovil Town	Total		92	2	5	0	—		4	0	101	2
Farnborough	2026–27	National League South	8	1	0	0	—		0	0	8	1
Career total			412	10	37	2	4	1	33	0	486	13

== Honours ==
Yeovil Town

- National League South: 2023–24
