= Listed buildings in Litherland =

Litherland is an area to the north of Liverpool in Sefton, Merseyside, England. It contains five buildings that are recorded in the National Heritage List for England as designated listed buildings, all of which are listed at Grade II. This grade is the lowest of the three gradings given to listed buildings and is applied to "buildings of national importance and special interest". The area is almost completely residential, and the listed buildings consist of two churches, a Methodist mission, a former Sunday school, and a farmhouse.

Name and location	Photograph	Date	Notes
Edge Farmhouse; 53.49101°N 2.99672°W	—	Early to mid 19th century	A brick house on a stone base with a slate roof in two storeys with a four-bay front. The second bay projects forward and is gabled. In the third bay is a trellised porch, and the windows are sashes.
St Philip's Church; 53.47101°N 2.99435°W		1861–63	The church was designed by H. Gee, and is in stone with a slate roof. It consists of a nave with a west porch, transepts, a short chancel with a south vestry and a northwest steeple. The steeple has a three-stage tower with clock faces on two sides, a cornice with gargoyles, and a splayed spire. Inside the church are hammerbeam roofs.
St Andrew's Church; 53.46102°N 2.99449°W		1904	The church, designed by Willink and Thicknesse in free Perpendicular style, is built in red brick with dressings in yellow terracotta and pantile roofs. It consists of a nave with a clerestory, a west narthex, north and south low passage aisles, a north apsidal baptistry, and a chancel with a north vestry and a south organ chamber. On the roof of the nave is a slate-covered timber flèche.
Linacre Methodist Mission; 53.46348°N 2.99751°W		1904	The Mission was designed by William James Morley, and is built in red brick and yellow terracotta with a slate roof. The building is in two storeys. The entrance front has three bays, the central bay is in terracotta, it is flanked by octagonal turrets, and contains a pair of round-headed entrances with a three-light window above. On the right side there are six gabled bays and, at the rear, is the Children's Hall, dated 1908.
Former Methodist Sunday School; 53.46315°N 2.99716°W		1914	Originally a Sunday School, later used as a factory, it was designed by W. J. Morley, and is built in red brick and yellow terracotta. The building is in three storeys and has fronts of nine and five bays. The central three bays on Hartwell Street are in terracotta. They contain the entrances and, in the top storey, is a Venetian window.
