= Alex Curran =

British model (born 1982)

- Born: Alexandra Curran; 23 September 1982 (age 44); Aintree, Merseyside, England
- Occupations: Model; fashion columnist
- Spouse: Steven Gerrard (m. 2007)
- Children: 4
- Modelling information
- Height: 5 ft 9 in (1.75 m)
- Hair colour: Blonde
- Eye colour: Blue

Alexandra Gerrard (née Curran; born 23 September 1982) is an English model, fashion columnist for the Daily Mirror, and the wife of former Liverpool and England captain Steven Gerrard. She was described as a leading "WAG" of the England national football team, along with women such as Victoria Beckham and Coleen Rooney. In 2007, the Times referred to her, then Steven Gerrard's fiancée, as an "über-WAG". On 29 October 2007, she launched her own fragrance, named "Alex", which was one of the top sellers of 2007.

== Writing ==
Curran wrote a weekly column for the Daily Mirror, titled "Go Shopping With Alex Curran". She wrote a weekly column for OK Magazine from 2009 until January 2013.

== Personal life ==
A former nail technician, Curran was born in Aintree, Merseyside and raised in Maghull, and attended Maghull High School. Curran and Steven Gerrard have been a couple since 2002. Prior to her relationship with Gerrard, Curran was dating businessman Tony Richardson, while Gerrard was dating Jennifer Ellison. At some point in 2002, Curran and Ellison switched lovers; The Guardian wrote, "who stole whom off whom is still the subject of some debate and perhaps Ellison's autobiography".

Curran and Gerrard married on 16 June 2007, at the Cliveden House luxury hotel in Buckinghamshire. They have three daughters and a son.

On 11 December 2007, while husband Steven Gerrard was away playing with Liverpool, the couple's home was burgled while she and another female resident were inside. Curran was confronted by four masked robbers who were reportedly there for a £10,000 watch that Curran had bought for Gerrard for Christmas. On the same day she had mentioned the watch in Closer magazine. Gerrard was the sixth Liverpool player to be burgled while away playing football.

== Other work ==
In 2010 Curran took to designing when she launched the Forever Unique by Alex Gerrard Collection. Her first collection was so successful that she launched a second collection in 2011.

Curran was revealed as the model for the new 2013 Lipsy VIP Collection.
