= Chesterfield High School =

Location
- Crosby, Merseyside, L23 9YB; England; 53.491°N 3.005°W

Information
- Type: Secondary Academy
- Motto: "For everyone the best" (Cuique Optimum)
- Established: 1974
- Local authority: Sefton
- Specialist: Sports and ICT
- Department for Education URN: 137514 Tables
- Ofsted: Reports
- Head Teacher: Jon Lawes
- Gender: Mixed
- Age: 11 to 18
- Enrolment: 1438 (April 2024)
- Website: www.chesterfieldhigh.org.uk

Chesterfield High School in Crosby, Merseyside, England, officially opened in 1974. The school has around 1,400 students in years 7–11.

The school was created as a comprehensive school by combining Waterloo Park Grammar School for Girls, Haigh Road, with Crosby County Secondary School for Boys, Coronation Road. It converted to academy status in 2011.

== History ==
=== Planning ===
The school was planned as part of the transition to comprehensive education and anticipated receiving pupils from Waterloo Park Grammar School for girls and Crosby Boys' Secondary School. Within the Crosby region, Chesterfield High School formed phase one of the transition, while significant extensions to what would then be Manor High School would form phase two.

=== Construction ===
Construction on the 22 acres (8.9 ha) new school site started in April 1970 with an estimated total cost of £485,000. During construction, the school site suffered an arson attack on 5 June 1971, during which gas cylinders exploded and a smoke rose around 500 feet (150 m) over the school. Four firemen were injured while fighting the fire that needed 50 firefighters to tackle the blaze. A police spokesman said on 7 June that three boys aged 10, 11 and 13 were helping with their inquiries as police believed the fire was deliberate, while concerns were raised by education officials about any delay affecting the introduction of comprehensive education in the borough. On 22 June, a spokesman for Lancashire County Council said that the damage was not serious enough to cause a delay and that construction work would continue. The cost of the damage was quoted by the surveyor Leslie Simpson as being £6,300, while the three boys were ordered into local authority care following court proceedings in October 1971.

=== Opening ===
Having been due to open to students in time for the start of the 1972 academic year, it was announced that the handover that was planned to be on Monday 8 August 1972 was delayed just weeks before the new term, due to builders joining in a national dispute that brought work to a halt. Contingency plans were therefore enacted which meant that students coming from the Waterloo Park Grammar School and Crosby Secondary Boys' School would remain, while new first year students would be based at Coronation Road and Waterloo Park. The first students to transfer to the new school came in October, although the school was not fully complete at this point. By December, building work had completed and the site was fully operational, with sixth formers completing the transition on the last day of the December 1972 term. Upon opening, the school could cater for around 900 pupils, with future provision for expanding to 1,500 once funds became available to extend the site.

Towards the end of the school's first year, headmistress Mrs M. S Thomas, speaking to the Formby Times, described the school as having had "a rewarding year" and said that "a good co-educational atmosphere has prevailed from the start". She said that despite the transition to a new school potentially having an adverse effect on school performance as some feared, results were "outstandingly good", with a record 79% of students in the fifth year achieving at least four pass grades. The school operated a split-site, using the former Waterloo Park Grammar school for younger students.

=== Operation ===
In November 1981, the school was the site of the electoral count for the 1981 Crosby by-election, whereby Social Democratic Party candidate Shirley Williams won the Crosby constituency and therefore became the first member of the party to win an election. In July 1989, the school won a large cash prize in a European Schools and Colleges competition, with group projects submitted by students in their third year of high school education.

==== Split site ====
From the opening of the school on Chesterfield Road up until the construction of The Mall in 1996, the school had two separate sites, with the former Waterloo Park Grammar site – referred to as "the Annexe" – housing the two youngest year groups.

A council report in February 1989 showed that the main school site, then accommodating 946 pupils, was urgently in need of repairs, yet the education department of Sefton Council was not prepared to allocate funds until the future of the 70-year-old annexe had been decided. Among the concerns raised were leaking roofs, cracked walls, rotting window frames and insufficient fire exits and lighting. Similarly, the annexe building also suffered from leaking roofs and poor insulation and it was estimated that closure of the annexe and reconstruction of the main site would cost around £1.3 million. The report noted that the land where the annexe was sited had a "high capital value" which would be released if it were to be demolished.

Construction of what would be called The Mall started at the main site in the mid-1990s to open for the 1996/1997 academic year, allowing the final closure of the Annexe. After completion of the scheme estimated to cost around £2.5m, students from the Annexe were moved across to the main site. Within hours of the move, the Annexe buildings were boarded up and demolished just weeks later. There is now no trace of these buildings, which although wooden structures, had stood for an 75 years. The demolition cost as reported by the Liverpool Echo was around £60,000.

==== Academy status ====
The school converted to an academy in October 2011. It is operated by Mersey View Learning Trust, a single-academy trust.

== Buildings ==
=== A, B, C and D block ===
The original school was designed in blocks, with an outdoor quad in the centre, referred to as 'A block (Administration)', 'B block', 'C block' and 'D block' respectively.

D block was originally intended as a junior section where the younger forms could have most of their lessons, away from most of the rigours from the older students within the school. It included a fully fitted kitchen which was never used, with an adjacent pair of classrooms, since redeveloped into technology workshops. Initially the first floor of D block was used open-plan, in accordance with educational philosophy during time of construction. To reduce construction costs, none of the blocks were designed with any through corridors.

Considering the buildings were cheaply constructed, over time the roof started to wear, opening up holes for heavy rain and the weakened roof structure caused problems with burglaries until a roof renewal programme eliminating the problem.

=== The Sixth Form Block ===
The sixth form at Chesterfield High School was managed by J. Deary. During construction of the high school, the Sixth Form building was ready first and Sixth Form students transferred there from Alexandra Hall. The Sixth Form building used a standard 'ROSLA' design amongst other secondary schools throughout the country alike, which first came into use upon the raising of the school leaving age from 15 to 16 in 1973.

In 1984, rumours began circulating that there were plans to change the nature of Sixth Form provision in Crosby, mainly due to the Metropolitan Borough of Sefton deciding to review Sixth Forms throughout the Borough, especially those which had fewer than 140 pupils. In March 1985, education chiefs in Sefton began 12 month consultation on the proposals due to falling pupil numbers. The proposals involved removing Sixth Forms from Crosby schools to place students into an expanded tertiary college centred on Hugh Baird College in Bootle. Numerous meetings were held between Chesterfield High School's and what was then Manor High School's senior management teams. Overwhelming support to keep the Sixth Form at Chesterfield concluded in its retention during a decisive meeting held in October 1986.

In September 2008, the sixth form block was refurbished following work by the head boy and assistant head boy and a £90,000 investment was made. This refurbishment included 30 new computers and space for the students to work. The investment was made after the sixth form was criticised during the Ofsted report. 'Standards in the sixth form are not as high as in the main school and are below the national average.'

In July 2020, the sixth form block was demolished to make way for an extension to the existing building which now houses the Humanities faculty. In September 2021, the land on which the building stood formed part of a project for a new 3G all weather sports pitch for the school.

=== The Mall ===
The Mall was officially opened 18 March 1996, with The Duke of Westminster invited to unveil the plaque. Also present at the ceremony were the Mayor, Councillor Terence Francis, and Mayoress, Sir Malcolm Thornton, MP, Councillor B Reynolds, Chairman of the Education Committee, John Marsden, Director of Education and Alan Moore, Director of Technical Services.

The mall created new classrooms for various number of departments, including English, Mathematics and Geography. It also included a new Library, replacing the older Library which used to reside where the language classrooms (L1 and L2) now are. Additional Science Laboratories were also built at the back of the school, bringing the total number of laboratories into double figures.

== Sixth form ==
=== Sport ===
==== Rugby ====
The Sixth Form Rugby team was founded in 2007 after a group of students who were relatively new to the sport started training sessions on the school field. The group attended training sessions every Wednesday after school and made steady progression with the game and following the support of geography teacher Chris Tees a rugby player for Southport Rugby Football Club, the sixth form rugby team played their first game against another local sixth form team which was drawn 10–10. The team has made steady progress since then and in September 2008 the team's progression was rewarded when the school provided the funding for rugby posts and a pitch to be marked out on the schools field. This has proved to be a success as the team currently has a 100% home record.

== Headteachers ==
Sybil Thomas (1972–1988) – Originally Headmistress of the Grammar School, Thomas took on the role of Headmistress of the then-new Chesterfield High School, overseeing its development. She retired in 1988, to be succeeded by Dr. A. K. Irving.

Alan K. Irving (1988–2005) – Irving who had been Deputy Head of Fairfield School, Widnes. After over 16 years as Chesterfield's Headteacher, Irving left the school for promotion to Schools and Young People's Director of Merseyside in 2005. However, Irving began a "£100,000-a-year" job in March 2006 as Schools and Young People's Director of Manchester.

Simon Penney (2006–2019)

Kevin Sexton (2019–2023)

Paul Lindley (2023–2025)

Jon Lawes (2025-present)

== Alumni ==
- Andy Jameson — swimmer and bronze medal winner at the 1988 Olympics
- Helen Jameson — swimmer and silver medal winner at the 1980 Olympics
- Jack Robinson — footballer and second youngest ever player for Liverpool F.C.
- James Vaughan — former Everton footballer, youngest ever goalscorer in Premier League
- Joe Gelhardt — Leeds United footballer
- Ben Tollitt — Morecambe F.C footballer
- Callum Lang — Portsmouth F.C footballer

== See also ==
- List of schools in the North West of England
