= Maricourt Catholic School =

Maricourt Catholic High School

Location
- Hall Lane; Maghull, Merseyside, L31 3DZ; United Kingdom; 53.508°N 2.938°W

Information
- Type: Voluntary Aided
- Motto: Latin: Gaudeamus in Domino "Let us Rejoice in the Lord"
- Religious affiliation: Roman Catholic
- Established: 1957
- Founders: Sisters of Mercy
- Local authority: Sefton
- Department for Education URN: 104960 Tables
- Ofsted: Reports
- Head teacher: Tracy Hatton
- Gender: Mixed
- Age: 11 to 18
- Enrolment: 1,300
- Colours: Maroon and gold
- Publication: Maricourt Voice
- Diocese: Archdiocese of Liverpool
- Website: www.maricourt.net

Maricourt Catholic High School, in Maghull, Merseyside, United Kingdom, formerly Mater Misericordiae Grammar School, was one of two Roman Catholic secondary schools administered by the Sisters of Mercy in Merseyside, the other being Broughton Hall, West Derby. The current headmaster is Ms. Tracey Hatton. The school celebrated its 50th anniversary in 2007 with the new headmaster Brendan McLoughlin. The former headteacher Sister Mary Teresa RSM BSc was the last of the Sisters to be Head the school and ceased her duties in 2007, opting to remain as deputy chair of the Board of Governors. The school offered both GCSE and Advanced Level qualifications for male and female students.

== History ==
The school was founded by the Sisters of Mercy on 12 September 1957, originally known as Mater Misericordiae Grammar School. It opened in the convent parlour of Quarry Brook House, former home of Meccano inventor and Conservative MP Frank Hornby, with only 16 eleven-year-old girls. The school eventually moved to the first small external section in January 1958. This section was formally blessed by Cardinal Heenan on 8 March in the same year. Due to the interest taken in it by the Bootle Education Committee, it rapidly grew in building size and pupil numbers, and became a voluntary aided Grammar School. It was the first co-educational voluntary aided school in the Archdiocese, opened under the new title of Maricourt Catholic High School, with Sister Mary Magdalen as headmistress. She retired at Christmas in 1989 and was succeeded by Sister Mary Teresa, who led the school until 2007. The school is now the largest Catholic secondary school in the Metropolitan Borough of Sefton. A jubilee mass was celebrated on 21 September 2007 in the Liverpool Metropolitan Cathedral. The chief celebrant was the Archbishop of Liverpool, Patrick Kelly, with thousands of friends, students, past and present attending the ceremony to celebrate the milestone.

== Sixth Form ==
The Sixth Form at Maricourt was rated as gaining some of the highest Advanced Level results in Merseyside and stand consistently above the national average, as well as enjoying a regular 100% pass rate for Advanced Level students. Maricourt works alongside Maghull High School and Deyes High School to form the Maghull Collaborative, in which students may study across these sixth forms to broaden the A-Level curriculum available within them. Facilities at Maricourt, based in Quarry Brook House, were subject to substantial refurbishment during the 2011 August Holidays with modified study areas as well as the conversion of one of Quarry Brook's larger first floor rooms into an Oratory for use by students.

== School Grounds ==
Maricourt is split across two sites, Newman Hall and Arnold Hall, upper and lower school respectively. Newman Hall, named in the honour of Cardinal John Henry Newman, is considered the school's main site and is home to both the administrative offices and most subject offices. School years 9 to 11 and the Sixth Form reside on this site for the majority of their lessons, and years 7 and 8 visit the site to use the available facilities, such as sports, drama and technology. Arnold Hall, previously the site of St Paul's Comprehensive, serves as the primary site for years 7 and 8, with sports facilities and rooms used by all students. Both sites have a large field used for recreation, physical education and sporting events.

== Previous Headteachers ==
Until 2007 previous headteachers had been both female and members of the Sisters of Mercy.

Name	Active
Sister Mary Magdalen RSM	1957–1989
Sister Mary Teresa RSM BSc	1989–2007
Brendan McLoughlin	2007–2019

{headteacher placeholder} || 2015–2016

== Notable former pupils ==
Alumni of Maricourt Catholic High School are known as Old Maricourtians. Noted Old Maricourtians include:

- Heidi Range, member of British girl band Sugababes.
- Sister Sister, drag queen.
- Megan Burns, musician and actress.
- Simon Richman, professional footballer.
- Stephen Darby, professional footballer.
- Aaron McGowan, professional footballer.
- Joe Rafferty, professional footballer.
- Liam Nolan, professional footballer.
- Jimmy Ryan, professional footballer.
- Alex Whittle, professional footballer.
- Adam Cummins, professional footballer.
- Paul Lewis, professional footballer.
- Conor Grant, professional footballer.
- George Green, professional footballer.
- Niall Watson, professional footballer.
- Tom Scully, professional footballer.
- Terry McPhillips, former professional footballer.
- Peter Charles, Show jumper and Olympic gold medallist.
- Anton Eager & Lewis Pike of The Cheap Thrills
