= St Michael's Church of England High School, Crosby =

St. Michael's Church of England Academy

Location
- Liverpool, Merseyside, L23 7UL; England; 53.498°N 3.035°W

Information
- Type: Academy
- Motto: Achievement for All
- Religious affiliation: Church of England
- Local authority: Sefton
- Department for Education URN: 141338 Tables
- Ofsted: Reports
- Headteacher: Roy Bellmon
- Gender: Mixed
- Age: 11 to 16
- Enrolment: 550
- Previous names: Manor High School St Michael's Church of England High School
- Website: http://www.stmichaelshigh.com

St Michael's Church of England Academy (formerly known as Manor High School & St Michael's Church of England High School) is a secondary school located in Crosby, Merseyside, England. The school's missionary statement is: We will ensure that each individual is valued and achieves success within a caring Christian community.

Facilities at the school include five computer rooms (140 computers in total), a sports hall and a gym. Since leaving the LDST, as of the 1 April 2025, the school is a member of the All Saints Multi Academy Trust, and is officially now known as an "academy", not a "high school". The headteacher is Mr Roy Bellmon, who came in with the Trust.

== History ==
Reports in 1973 noted that the school was "underused", whereby in contrast the nearby Chesterfield High School was overcrowded. A decision was reached by the council's education committee that local primary school St. Thomas's should instead be a feeder for Manor High School to balance the load more evenly. Due to vandalism, the education committee pressed for expediency on a caretaker's house to be built on the school site.

A council report in February 1989 highlighted that areas of the school's building was in "urgent need of repair", including poorly fitted and rusted window frames, inadequate external lighting and a heating system which was not effective. The Director of Education John Marsden noted that the local authority had spent considerable sums undertaking repair and maintenance work at the school, which then accommodated around 715 pupils. The school came under criticism in June 1989 after cancelling a planned play of Our Day Out, citing concerns by parents who did not approve of the "bad language" and a scene which encouraged shop lifting. Playwright Willy Russell believed the language was only "staggeringly tame" and suggested that language used among students in the playground was likely to be more vulgar.

=== Building work ===
Work on a capital building project started on 26 November 2007 and finished in September 2008. During this time, the main hall was remodelled into a performing arts venue, the dining room facilities was extended and developed, and one of the entrance areas was renovated.

==== Phase One ====
This started in November 2007 and finished in April 2008; it included a new Main Hall, car park and entrance. This phase is complete and the school now has new media centre and main hall with a new floor, stage, lighting and stage curtains. The hall also has a booth in the corner to control the lighting and sound. A new car park at the front of the school was also completed and in July 2008 was extended into a disused playground, ready for the 2008 academic year.

==== Phase Two ====
This phase started on Monday 17 March 2008 finished in September 2008. This phase included the extension to the dining room. The extension of the dining room was finished and a new front car park for the school was built, along with renovations of the old dining room.

Work was completed in October 2008 and the school now has a new Arts and Media centre, extended dining room facilities and improved access to the school. They are now renovating small areas of the school. The back of the school is getting new pavement stones put down. 2010 saw the school get a recording studio alongside the new main hall.

Major building work started in 2011 and finished in October 2012. This included opening the disused M block as the then sixth form learning centre and what is now just humanities. Other parts of the school were changed, including all new roofing and electrics and new musical facilities. Most walls in the front were plastered and all the floors were replaced. Computing rooms received new personal computers for student use.

== School Blocks ==
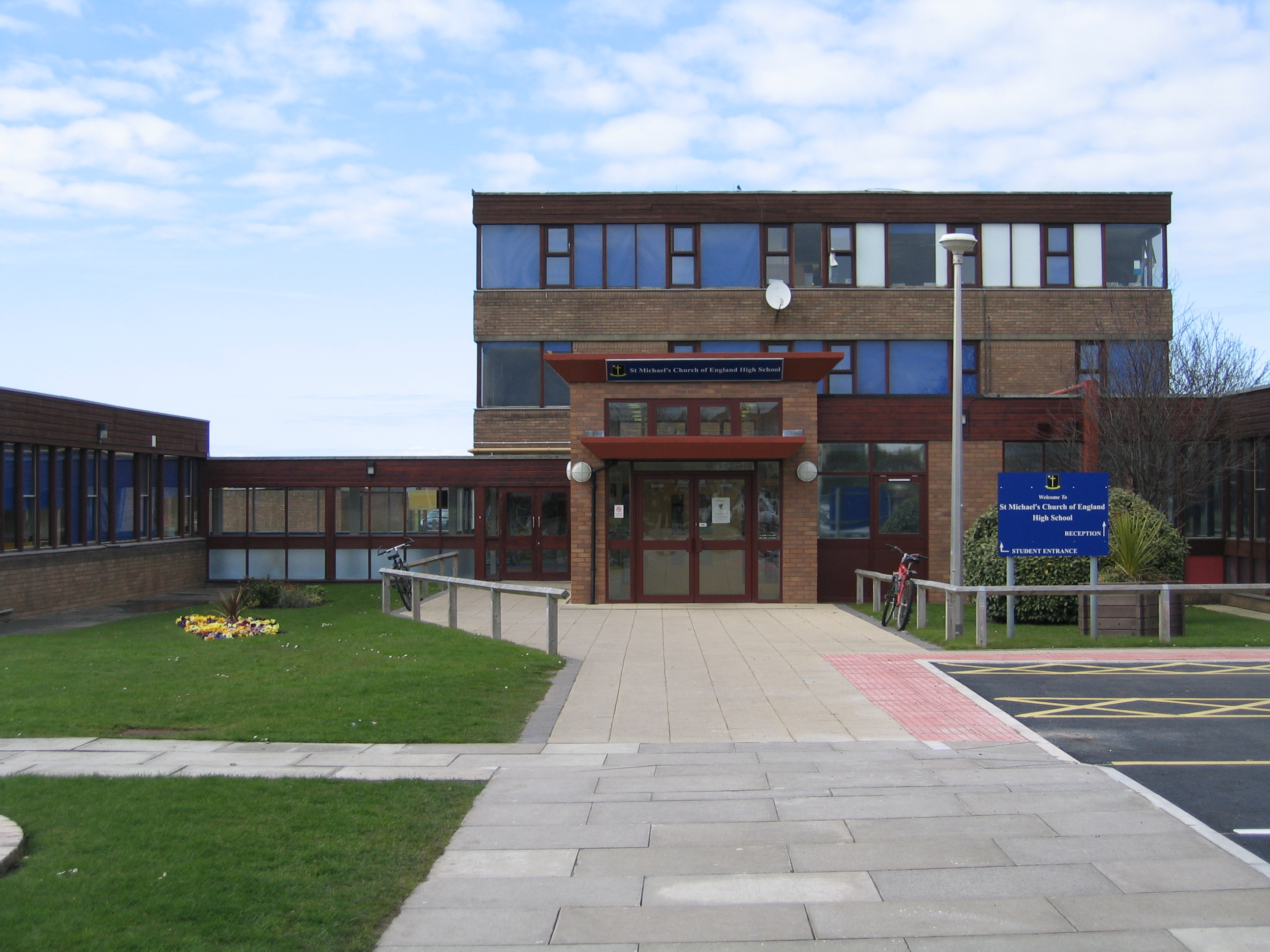
The main entrance to the school

The school is separated into five blocks, divided by broad study subjects.

=== P Block ===
P Block is found at the main entrance of the school, containing the main office, student services, headteacher's office, attendance & safeguarding offices, and chapel. Subjects in this block include Design Technology, Food Technology, Textile Technology, Child Development and Art. The chapel, formerly the drama hall, is used primarily for chaplaincy assemblies, however is sometimes used for additional functions, such as displaying the work of students.

=== M Block ===
M Block is the tallest part of the school, containing its History, Geography, Religious Studies and Modern Foreign Languages classrooms. Previously the Sixth Form Centre was on the second floor before its permanent closure in June 2025.

=== E Block ===
E block is located on the far side of the school and is furthest away from the main entrance. Subjects in the block include English, Mathematics, ICT, Business Studies, Music and the brand new Drama Studio, which was launched in 2025. Aside from learning facilities the E Block contains the school's main hall, recording studio, media centre and isolation rooms, also known as "reflection". Facilities for SEN students are also found in the E Block, including the sensory room, dyslexic unit, SEND alternative provision (the Spire) and the ASD base (ASC).

=== S Block ===
S Block contains solely classrooms for scientific subjects. It is the school's newest block, following the destruction of the previous S Block in an arson attack in March 1994, started by 19-year-old Andrea Blundell, who was suffering with paranoia. The cost of the damage was estimated around £1.5 million.

=== P.E. Block ===
The P.E. Block is at the right-centre of the school, whilst the sports hall was built on to E Block when the girls school converted to a comprehensive school. The school's gym hall was part of the original building, along with one set of changing rooms; those next to the sports hall were also an addition to E Block. There are offices for P.E. teachers and store rooms for equipment. Upstairs next to this the is IT4, which is a computer room available to students during break & lunch periods to complete study, designated following the closure of the school's dedicated library in 2024. The Pastoral Hub where SLT and learning mentor leaders are based is also found in the P.E block.

== International links ==
The school works with the Waterloo Partnership, a local charity, by donating items such as clothes, stationery and toiletries to Peninsular Secondary School in Waterloo, Sierra Leone. In February 2007, a teacher from the school, along with other delegates from local schools and the Partnership, visited Sierra Leone. A major part of the visit was devoted to undertaking teaching in schools.

== Notable former pupils ==
- Martyn Andrews, television presenter, journalist and singer (previously Andrew Martin)
- Craig Phillips, winner of the first series of reality television show Big Brother
