= Litherland (ward) =

Ward of Sefton, in Merseyside, UK

Coordinates: 53.4718°N 2.9961°W

Litherland is a Metropolitan Borough of Sefton ward in the Bootle Parliamentary constituency that covers the southern part of the locality of Litherland. The ward population taken at the 2011 census was 11,231.

== Councillors ==
Term	Councillor	Party
1992–Present	Paul Tweed	Labour Party
2003–Present	Patricia Hardy	Labour Party
2010–Present	John Kelly	Labour Party

== Election results ==
=== Elections of the 2010s ===
Sefton Metropolitan Borough Council Municipal Elections 2011: Litherland
Party	Candidate	Votes	%	±%
Labour	Cllr Paul Tweed	2132	85%	
Conservative	Helen Louise Barber	235	9%	
Liberal Democrats	Daniel George Lewis	151	6%	
Majority				
Turnout		2518	31%	
Labour hold		Swing		

Sefton Metropolitan Borough Council Municipal Elections 2010: Litherland
Party	Candidate	Votes	%	±%
Labour	John Kelly	3278	70%	
Liberal Democrats	Daniel George Lewis	625	13%	
Conservative	Nigel Stuart Barber	347	7%	
UKIP	John David Bryant	312	7%	
BNP	Dean McGrane	132	3%	
Majority				
Turnout		4694	56%	
Labour hold		Swing		
