= Litherland Town Hall =

Municipal building in Litherland, Merseyside, England

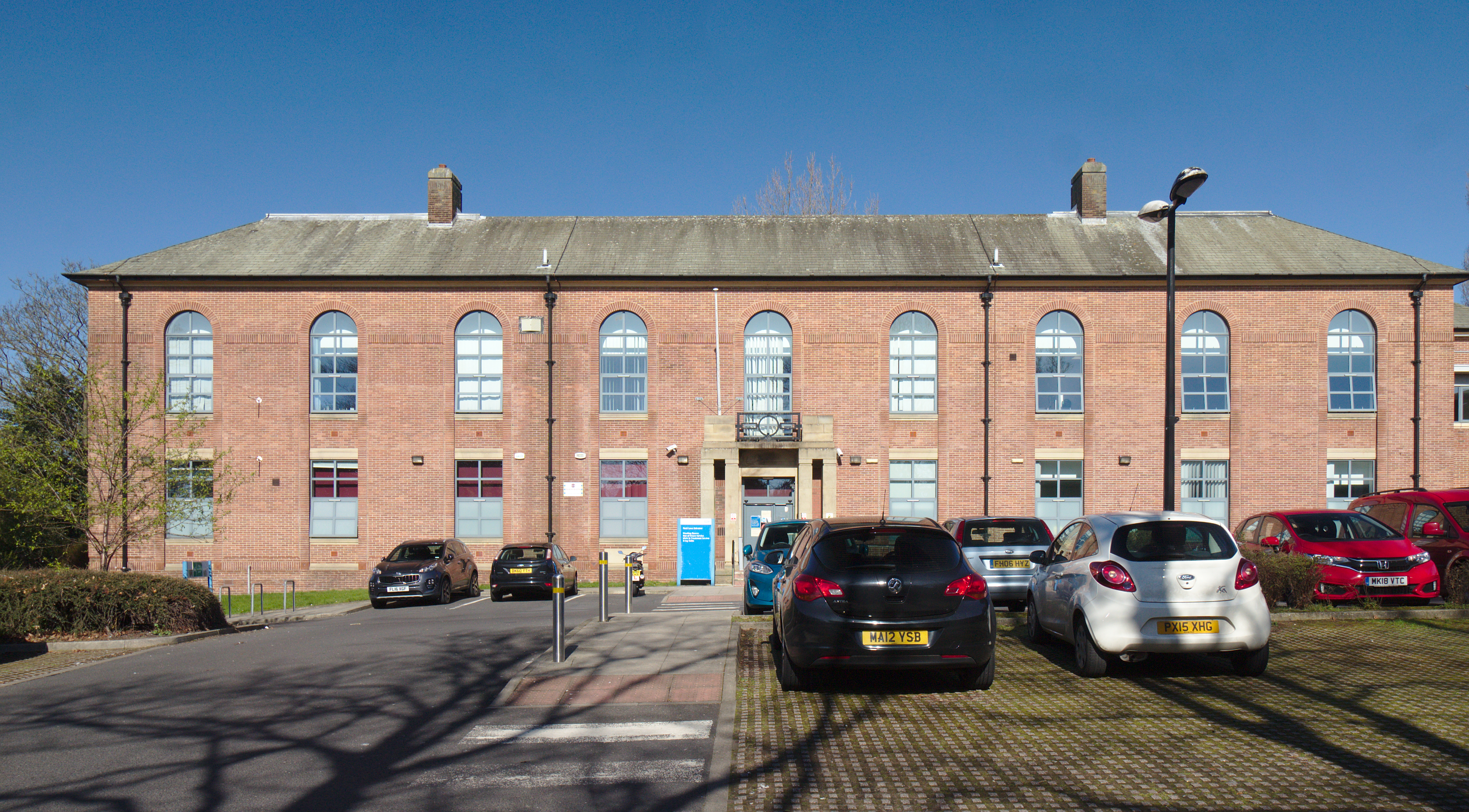
- Litherland Town Hall

- Shown in Merseyside
- 53.4710°N 3.0020°W
- Location: Hatton Hill Road, Litherland

History
- Built: 1940

Site notes
- Architect: Gerald de Courcy Fraser
- Architectural style: Italianate style

Litherland Town Hall is a former municipal building in Hatton Hill Road, Litherland, Merseyside, England. The structure, which was the headquarters of Litherland Urban District Council, now functions as a health centre. The building was a performance venue for music groups including the Beatles, who played there 20 times early in their career in 1960 and 1961.

== History ==
Following significant population growth, largely associated with its proximity to the Liverpool Docks, the area became an urban district in 1894. The new council initially based itself in offices at Summerhill Cottage before acquiring Litherland House in 1904. In the 1930s, civic leaders decided to commission a purpose-built town hall: the site they selected formed part of the open land alongside Field Lane which later became known as Hatton Hill Park.

The foundation stone for the new building was laid by the chairman of the council, Councillor J. W. Anderson, on 25 February 1939. It was designed by architect Gerald de Courcy Fraser in the Italianate style and built in red brick with stone dressings at a cost of £20,000. It was officially opened by the chairman of the council, Councillor John Eaton in February 1941. The design involved a symmetrical main frontage with nine bays facing southeast towards Sefton Road; the central bay featured a doorway flanked by pairs of pilasters supporting an entablature and a wrought-iron grill. There was a French door on the first floor. The other bays were fenestrated by square headed casement windows with architraves on the ground floor and by round headed windows on the first floor. Internally, the principal room was the main assembly hall which was equipped with a stage.

In the early 1950s, the town hall housed a "civic museum room" created by the Litherland Historical Society, displaying dockworkers' tools, photographs of the old tramway system, and a model of the original Summerhill Cottage council office. It closed in 1958 after poor attendance and the collection was transferred to the Bootle Museum.

The Beatles, having just returned from Hamburg, performed in front of a live audience of 1,500 enthusiastic fans at the town hall on 27 December 1960, in what is regarded by some commentators as the birth of Beatlemania. The band performed 20 shows at the town hall including their final performance there in November 1961. The building continued to serve as the headquarters of Litherland Urban District Council but ceased to be the local seat of government when the enlarged Sefton Council was formed in 1974. It was then used as a community events centre until being converted into a health centre, under an initiative led by Lord Darzi to provide wider access to healthcare, in 2009.
