= Linacre Methodist Mission =

Building in Sefton, Merseyside, UK

Coordinates: 53.4635°N 2.9973°W

The Linacre Methodist Mission is a building on Linacre Road, in Litherland, Metropolitan Borough of Sefton, Merseyside, United Kingdom. Built in 1904, it is a grade II listed building.

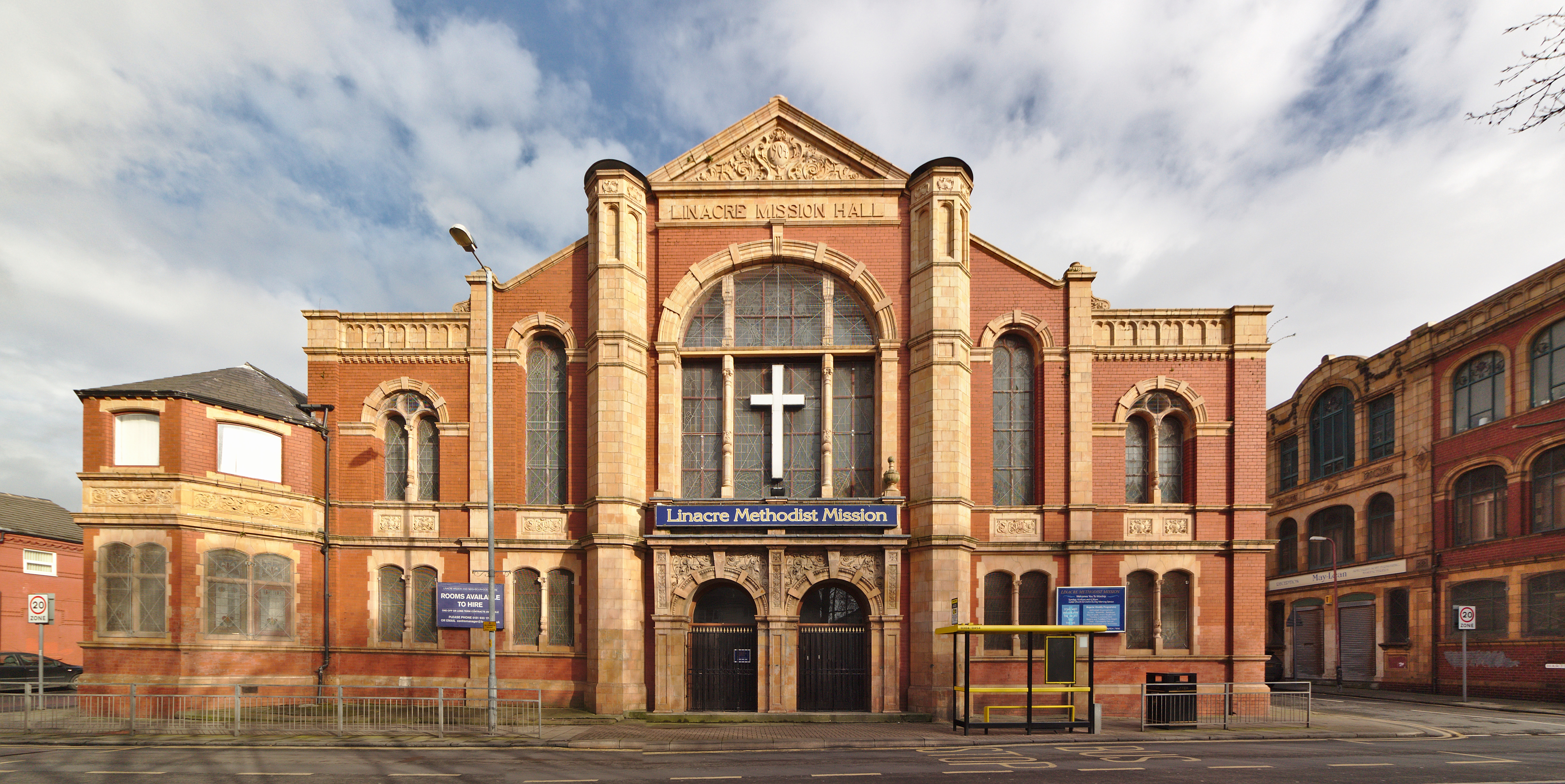
