= Maghull High School =

Location
- Liverpool, Merseyside, L31 7AW; United Kingdom; 53°30′23″N 2°57′05″W

Information
- Type: Academy
- Established: 1982
- Local authority: Sefton
- Specialist: Arts
- Department for Education URN: 137520 Tables
- Ofsted: Reports
- Headmaster: Matthew Kay
- Gender: Coeducational
- Age: 11 to 18
- Enrolment: 1,024
- Houses: Molyneux, Clent, Unsworth and Seel
- Colour: Navy Blue
- Website: http://www.maghullhigh.com

Maghull High School is one of three secondary schools in Maghull.

== History ==
The school was established in 1982 by the merger of Ormonde Drive High School and Old Hall High School on the Ormonde Drive site. Old Hall High School had originally opened as Maghull Grammar School, in 1954. In 1972, the school was renamed Old Hall High School. Ormonde Drive High School was originally opened by Lancashire County Council as Ormonde Drive County Secondary School in 1954.

The school's sixth form academy was originally Woodend Primary School but was later changed to the sixth form after the merger of the two old schools. As of 2011 the school converted to an academy status.

The Old Hall site is now a housing estate on the opposite side of the A59, covered by the roads Broxholme Way, Aisthorpe Grove, Glentworth Close and Hornby Chase.

In 2017 to 2018 building began on a major re-build of the existing school complex which will see the original 1950's buildings of the former Ormonde Drive High School demolished. The Sixth Form building, O'Kane Centre, Four-storey and adjacent Dave Mercer Way are all expected to be retained. The same year also saw the retirement as Headmaster of Mr Mark Anderson after 14 years, with Ms Davina Aspinall becoming Headmistress. In early 2024, Mr Matthew Kay succeeded as new Headmaster.

== School Houses ==
The school houses are Molyneux, Clent, Unsworth and Seel with blue, green, red and yellow as their respective house colours.

The Molyneux house is named after the Molyneux family, who formerly held the Earldom of Sefton until the death of the last Earl in 1972. Unsworth also comes from the name of a former prominent family in the Liverpool area. Seel is named after Thomas Seel, a Liverpool merchant of whom Seel Street in the Ropewalks area Liverpool City Centre is named after. Clent is taken from the name of Clent Avenue which is a nearby street in Maghull.

== Sixth Form ==
According to the 2014 OFSTED report "Achievement in the sixth form is good and shows an improving trend in both academic and vocational courses. Students achieve particularly well in drama, travel and tourism and media studies." The Sixth Form centre is also part of the collaboration project between three of the schools in Sefton along with Deyes High School and Maricourt Catholic High School

== Academic Performance ==
In 2014 a visit from OFSTED reported that at the school "students are supported, encouraged and cared for very well." The report also stated the "students are friendly and welcoming; they treat each other and adults with respect and behave responsibly around the school." Overall the school received a grade 3 "requires improvement" status by OFSTED. site.

GCSE results (as of 2014) work out at 78% of entries being A* to D grade with the average result being C. Average GCSE grade in English Language calculated a grade B and English Literature a grade C.

A 2026 visit from OFSTED graded curriculum and teaching needs attention. It stated "Teachers' checks on what pupils know are not consistently effective."

== Headteachers ==
| Name | Tenure | Duration |
|---|---|---|
| Mr Peter Roy Perdue | 1982-1999 | 16 years |
| Sir John Francis Jones | 1999-2004 | 5 years |
| Mr Mark Robert Anderson | 2004-2018 | 14 years |
| Ms Davina Jayne Aspinall | 2018-2024 | 5 years |
| Mr Matthew Kay | 2024–Present | 2 years |

Mr Peter Perdue was originally Headmaster of Ormonde Drive High School from 1972 until the merger which he oversaw during his tenure. He died in 2023 at the age of 88.

Sir John Jones was knighted in the 2003 New Year Honours by Queen Elizabeth II while Headmaster.

Mr Mark Anderson continues to teach Geography and Politics at the school as of 2024.

Ms Davina Aspinall was the first Headmistress of the school.

Mr Matthew Kay succeeded as Headmaster in early 2024.

== Notable former pupils ==
=== Maghull High School ===
- Alex Curran
- Ryan Ledson
- Connor Randall
- Calum Dyson
- Nick Ball
- Brad Strand

=== Maghull Grammar School ===
- Keith Ely, Editor from 1989 to 1995 of the Liverpool Daily Post
- Prof Steve Young FREng, Professor of Information Engineering since 1995 at the University of Cambridge, and winner of the 2015 IEEE James L. Flanagan Speech and Audio Processing Award

=== Ormonde Drive High School ===
- Mark Hateley

=== Ormonde Drive Secondary Modern ===
- Eddie Hemings
