= James Graham (rugby league) =

English rugby league player

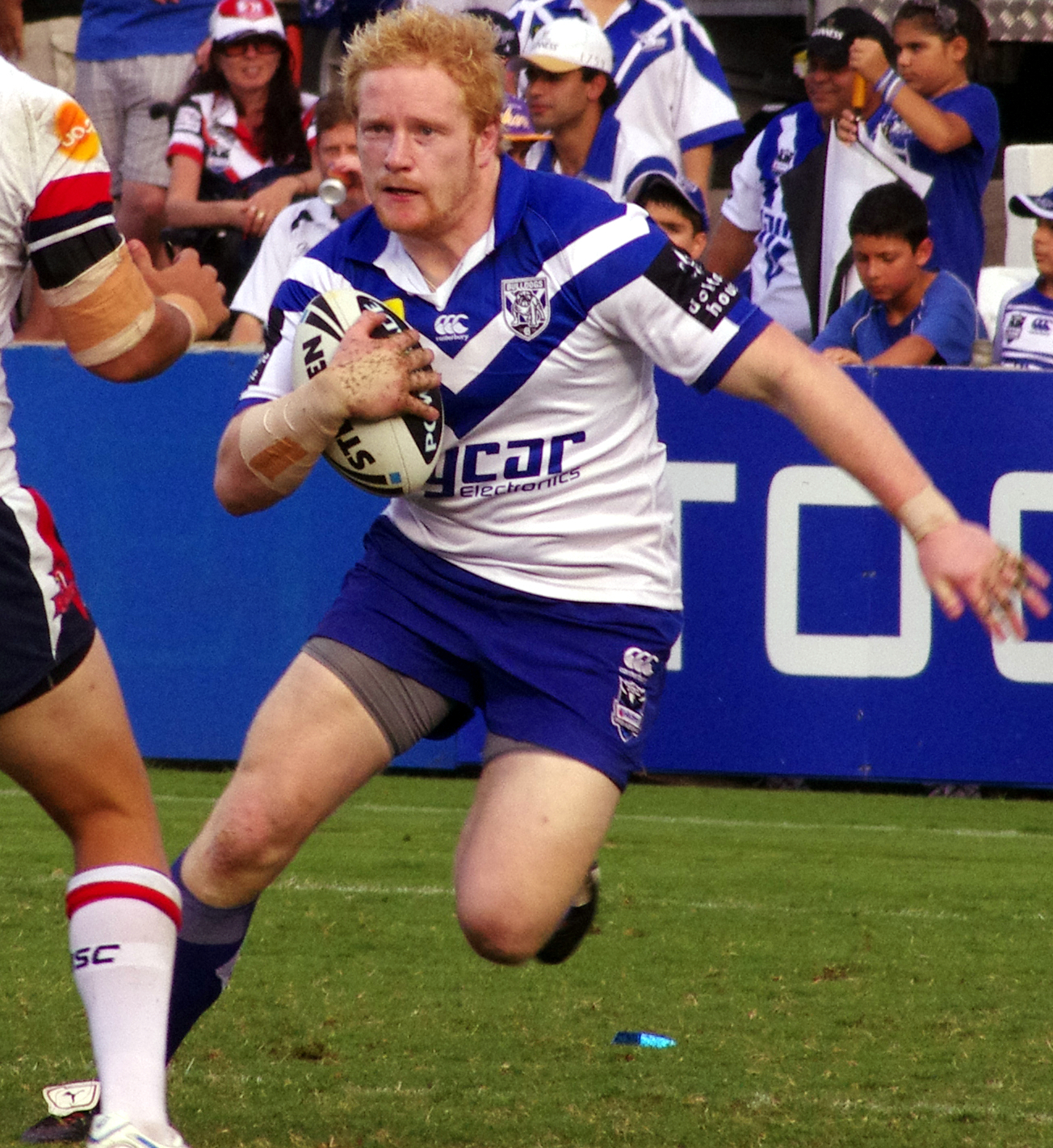

Personal information
- Born: 10 September 1985 (age 41) Maghull, Merseyside, England

Playing information
- Height: 6 ft 2 in (1.88 m)
- Weight: 17 st 0 lb (108 kg)
- Position: Prop
Club
Years	Team	Pld	T	G	FG	P
2003–11	St Helens	226	53	0	0	212
2012–17	Canterbury Bulldogs	135	9	0	0	36
2018–20	St. George Illawarra	51	1	0	0	4
2020	St Helens	12	1	0	0	4
	Total	424	64	0	0	256
Representative
Years	Team	Pld	T	G	FG	P
2006–19	Great Britain	9	2	0	0	8
2008–18	England	45	3	0	0	12
2015–16	NRL All Stars	2	0	0	0	0

James Graham (born 10 September 1985) is an English former professional rugby league player who played as a prop for St Helens in the Super League, and at international level for England and Great Britain.

After 224 appearances for St Helens, and having won a number of Championships and Challenge Cups with them, he moved to Sydney for the 2012 NRL season. Graham has played for the Canterbury-Bankstown Bulldogs and the St. George Illawarra Dragons in the National Rugby League, and has also played for the NRL All Stars.

Graham lost six grand finals in a row, including five in a row with St Helens in the Super League competition across the 2007–2011 seasons, and with the Canterbury-Bankstown Bulldogs in the Australian National Rugby League in 2012. He then played in the 2014 NRL Grand Final defeat by the South Sydney Rabbitohs, and he also featured for England in the 2017 Rugby League World Cup Final defeat by Australia.

== Early life ==
Graham was born in Maghull, Merseyside, and was educated at Deyes High School. Graham played rugby league at an early age after being introduced to the game by his father, John, who originated from Cumbria. He began playing junior rugby league for St Helens Crusaders, and also went on to play for Blackbrook as a teenager.

== Club career ==
=== St Helens ===
Graham signed with Saints as a junior in 2000, eventually playing his way through the Junior Academies before making his senior début against Castleford in August 2003. Graham already had leadership experience after captaining the England Academy in a famous series victory in Australia in 2004.

Graham played for St Helens from the interchange bench in their 2006 Challenge Cup Final victory against Huddersfield. Then-Great Britain coach Brian Noble selected Graham in a friendly against New Zealand earlier in 2006 in the Castlemaine XXXX Test in which he made a try scoring début at Knowsley Road. St Helens reached the 2006 Super League Grand final to be contested against Hull FC, and Graham played from the interchange bench in Saints' 26–4 victory. As 2006 Super League champions, St Helens faced 2006 NRL Premiers the Brisbane Broncos in the 2007 World Club Challenge. Graham played from the substitute bench in Saints' 18–14 victory.

The young prop made a name for himself in 2007's Super League XII, making 27 first team appearances and being named Saints' Young Player of the Year which has also seen him named as a contender for Super League Young Player of the Year, with competition from Wigan rival Chris Ashton. He signed a new contract at St. Helens to tie his future at the Knowsley Road based club until 2011.

He was named in the Super League Dream Team for 2008's 2008 season. James won the 2008 Man of Steel award, making him the fourth successive St Helens player to win the prestigious award having beaten rival Jamie Peacock, and teammate Leon Pryce. He follows teammates James Roby, Paul Wellens, Jamie Lyon, Paul Sculthorpe (two spells) and Sean Long in being named Man of Steel.

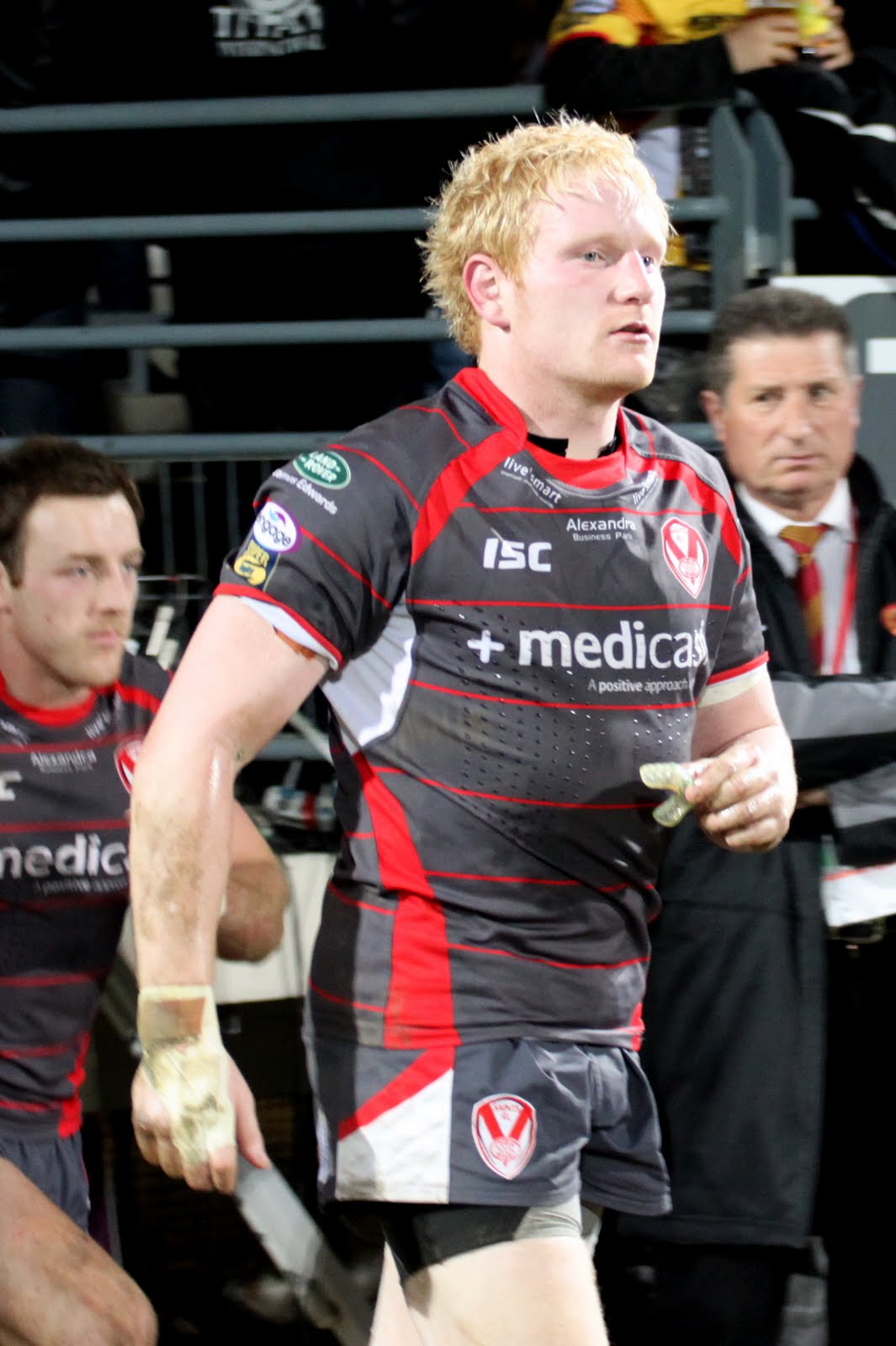
Graham playing for St Helens in 2011

He was named in the Rugby League Writers' team of the year in 2008 and the Rugby League World magazine the following year in 2009.

He played in the 2009 Super League Grand Final defeat by the Leeds Rhinos at Old Trafford.

2011 would be Graham's final year at Saints as a host of NRL clubs coveted his signature. Canterbury Bulldogs and Parramatta Eels were thought to head the list of interested clubs.

On 27 April 2011 it was confirmed by club officials that St Helens joint captain Graham would join NRL side the Canterbury-Bankstown Bulldogs when his contract expires at the end of the 2011 season. "We did everything practical to persuade James to stay," said Saints chairman Eamonn McManus. "But we respect his wishes and ambitions. There comes a point where you have to just shake his hand and wish him luck." Graham left St Helens with a 4–5 record in finals (1-5 in Super League Grand Finals in 2006, and 2007–2011; and 3–0 in Challenge Cup Finals from 2006 to 2008).

He played in the 2011 Super League Grand Final defeat by the Leeds Rhinos at Old Trafford.

=== Canterbury-Bankstown ===
He played 26 games in his début NRL season and was part of the Canterbury team which lost the Grand Final to Melbourne Storm. However he was at the centre of the match's most controversial incident when he appeared to bite the left ear of Storm fullback Billy Slater. Graham denied the charge but despite inconclusive video footage was widely condemned and subsequently suspended for 12 matches by the NRL Judiciary in a hearing lasting ten minutes.

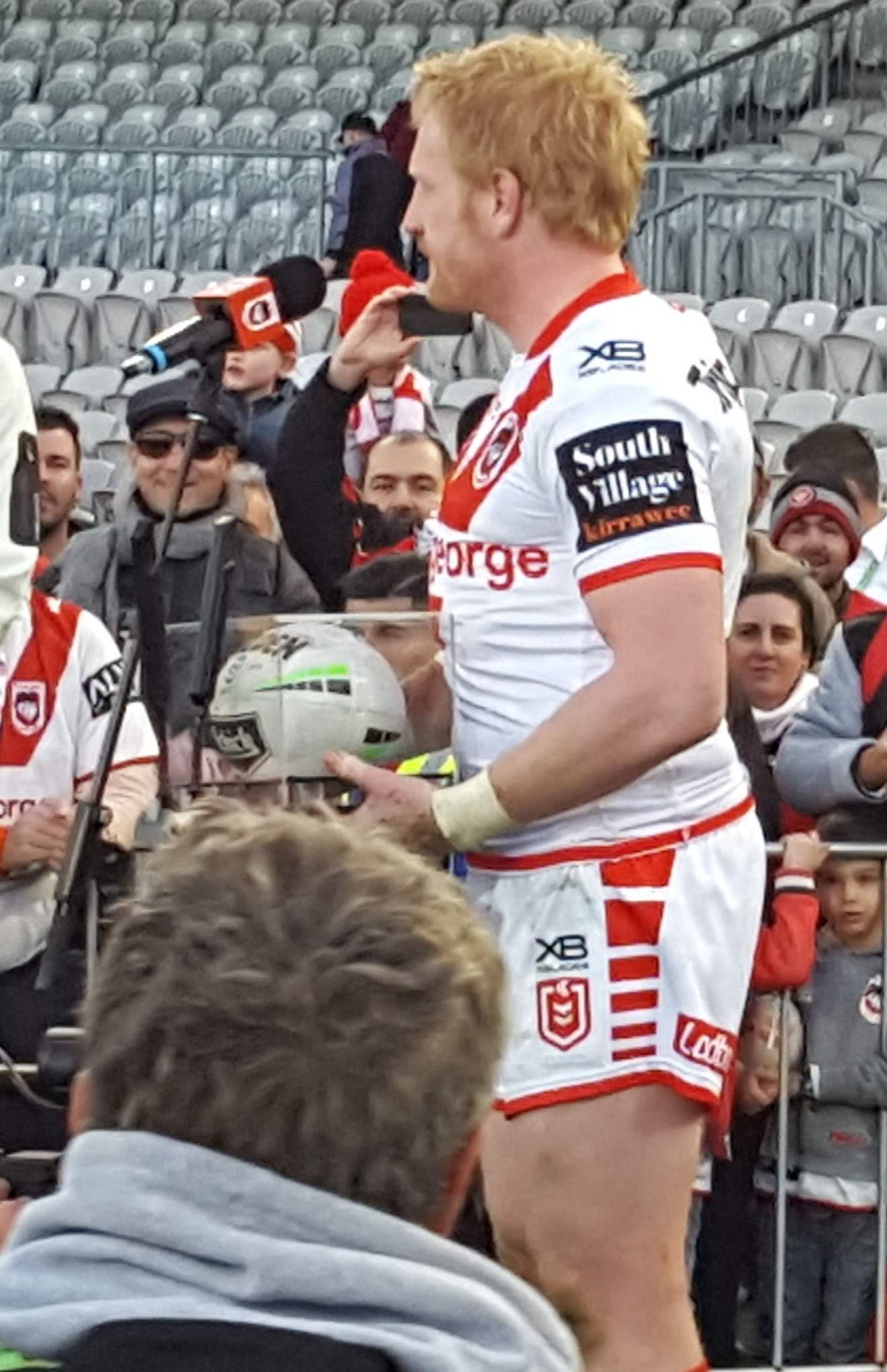
Graham after his 400th game

After Canterbury captain Michael Ennis was ruled out of the 2014 NRL Grand Final due to a foot injury, Graham along with teammate Trent Hodkinson were named co-captains of the Bulldogs for the match. At the Bulldogs 2015 season launch, Graham was named the club captain for the club's 80th season, replacing former rake Michael Ennis. It was also announced that the Englishman will be joined in the role with newly appointed vice-captains, Aiden Tolman and Frank Pritchard.

Towards the end of the 2017 season, Graham was "squeezed out" of the Canterbury-Bankstown squad. The club had players on back-ended contracts that would have exceeded their salary cap. Graham said, "I was being told by Des Hasler he wanted me to stay. I was being told by Raelene Castle that everything was sweet. Then when I met the chairman Ray Dib, Ray looked at me and he goes, 'You have got to go, if we keep you we are not playing for points next year.'"

=== St. George Illawarra Dragons ===
On 5 September during NRL 360, Graham announced that he had signed a three- year deal with St. George Illawarra starting in the 2018 NRL season. The deal was confirmed by his previous club Canterbury-Bankstown and future club St. George Illawarra on 7 September 2017.

In Graham's first year at the Dragons, the club qualified for the finals and defeated Brisbane in week one 48–18 before being eliminated the following week by South Sydney losing 13–12.

Graham played in the club's first 11 games of the 2019 NRL season but was taken from the field during St. George Illawarra's 22–9 loss against Cronulla. Scans later revealed that Graham had suffered a fibula fracture and was ruled out for 8 weeks. In round 21, he played his 400th first grade game as St. George Illawarra defeated the Gold Coast 40–28 at Kogarah Oval. Graham made a total of 19 appearances for St. George Illawarra as the club endured one of their worst ever seasons finishing 15th on the table.

=== St Helens ===
On 25 June 2020, Graham was released by St. George to pursue an opportunity to go back home to St Helens.

Graham played in the 2020 Super League Grand Final which St Helens won 8–4 in dramatic circumstances at the KCOM Stadium in Hull. It was Graham's final game as a player.

== Representative career ==
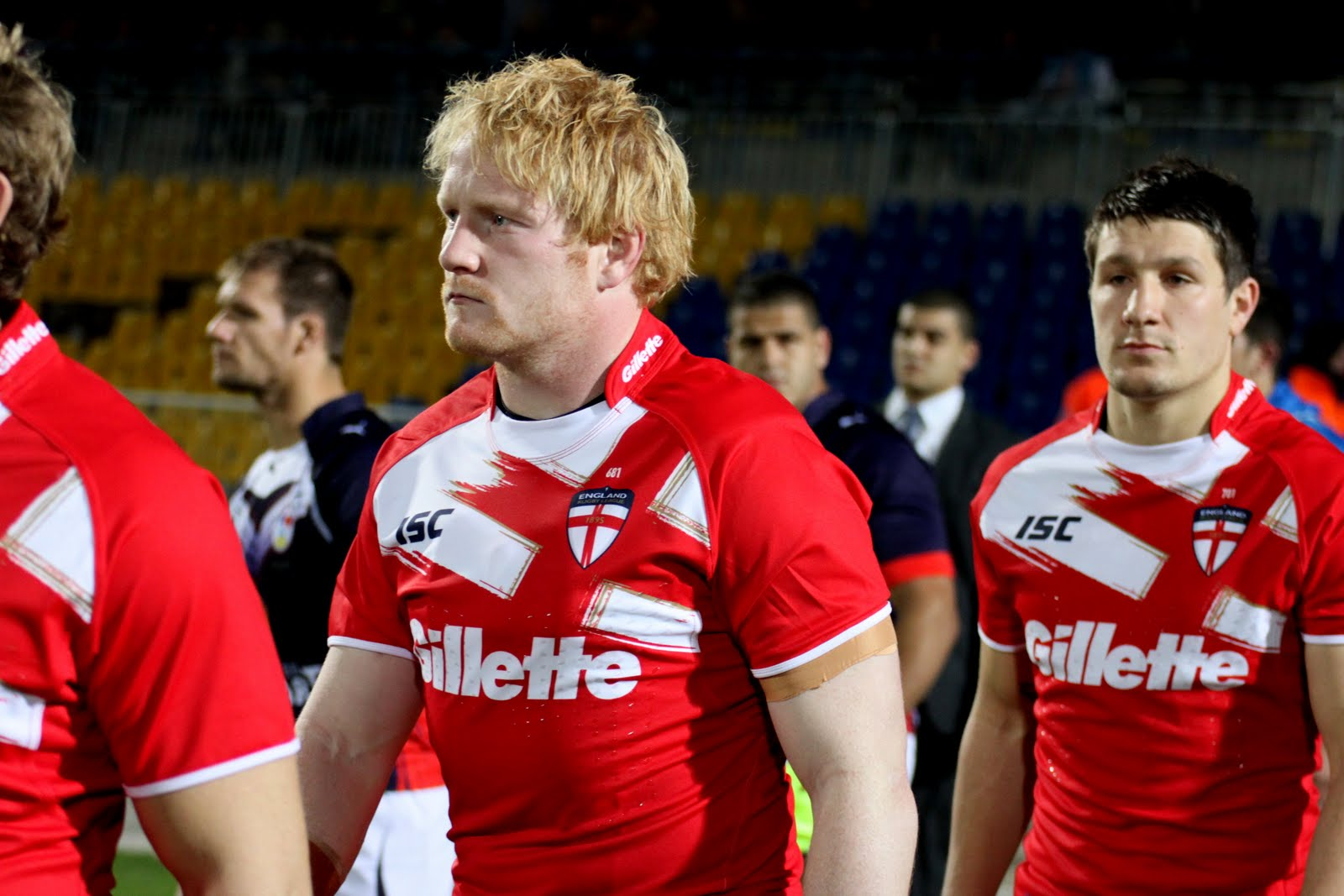
Graham representing England in 2011

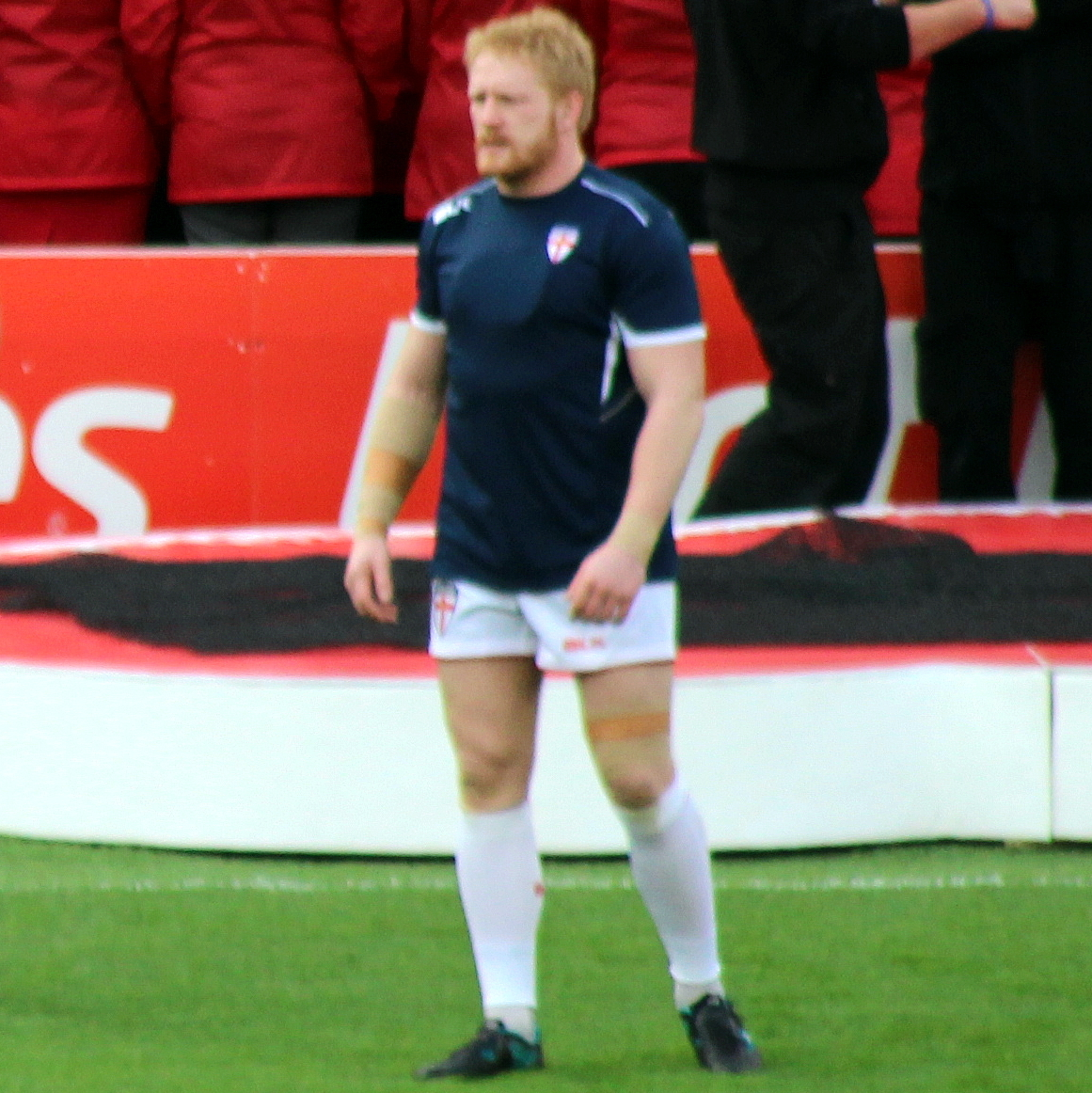
Graham warming up for England in 2016

James made his international début for Great Britain in the 2006, scoring twice in a mid-season international with New Zealand. He missed the Tri-Nations later that season after injuring himself during a drunken episode involving his St Helens teammates. He went on to make another three Great Britain appearances which would all come in the 2007 All Golds Tour before the nation would be ceased and split up into three countries: England, Scotland and Wales.

The following year in June, James made his début for the re-established England team against France in Toulouse. James would go on to play for England in one more fixture, against Wales in Doncaster, before being selected in the 2008 Rugby League World Cup team. He would go on to appear in 3 of England's 4 appearances in their campaign.

He was selected to play for England against France in the one-off test in 2010.

Due to an injury to tour captain Adrian Morley, Graham was handed over the captaincy of England's 2010 Four Nations tournament squad, and in doing so became one of the youngest ever captains of the national side. Graham played in the 2011 Four Nations and 2013 Rugby League World Cup.

Graham was the vice-captain of England at the 2014 Four Nations. He captained the team in their match against Samoa.

At the conclusion of the 2015 domestic season, Graham was selected to play for England in the 2015 end-of-year internationals against France and New Zealand. He appeared in the France test match where England went on to rout their opponents. He made history in the opening test-match of the series against New Zealand as he officially became the most capped England international, making his 28th appearance for England, since their re-inauguration from Great Britain. He expressed his pride and joy after realising he had now officially beaten Kevin Sinfield's record.

In October 2016, Graham was selected in the England squad for the 2016 Four Nations. Before the tournament, he captained the team in a test match against France in the absence of 'usual' captain Sam Burgess after he was unavailable due to suspension. Graham captained England to a 40–6 victory.

In October 2017 he was selected in the England squad for the 2017 Rugby League World Cup. England made it to the final but were defeated by Australia 6–0.

In 2018 he was selected for England against France at the Leigh Sports Village.

On 9 October, Graham was selected as captain of the England 2019 Rugby League World Cup 9s Squad.

He was selected in the squad for the 2019 Great Britain Lions tour of the Southern Hemisphere.

Graham announced his international retirement in September 2020.

== Post playing ==
Following retirement, Graham works as rugby league commentator for Triple M Sydney and also runs the Bye Round Podcast. In 2021, Graham returned to St. George Illawarra and he took up a role with the clubs NRLW squad.

Graham appeared in 2024 ABC series Plum. On 18 February 2025, Graham was inducted with a life membership for the Canterbury-Bankstown Bulldogs. Following Canterbury's 2025 elimination semi-final loss to Penrith, Graham came under criticism after he called referee Ashley Klein a “bottless git” and an “absolute bottle job” live on air while calling the game with the Triple M radio team.

== Statistics ==
Year	Team	Games	Tries	Pts
2003	St Helens	1		
2004	St Helens	7		
2005	St Helens	27	6	24
2006	St Helens	30	8	32
2007	St Helens	34	8	32
2008	St Helens	31	11	44
2009	St Helens	31	7	28
2010	St Helens	28	5	20
2011	St Helens	30	6	24
2012	Canterbury-Bankstown	26		
2013	Canterbury-Bankstown	18	2	8
2014	Canterbury-Bankstown	28	5	20
2015	Canterbury-Bankstown	18	1	4
2016	Canterbury-Bankstown	25		
2017	Canterbury-Bankstown	20	1	4
2018	St. George Illawarra	26	1	4
2019	St. George Illawarra	19		
2020	St. George Illawarra	6		
2020	St Helens	12	1	4
	Totals	423	64	256
