= Listed buildings in Maghull =

Maghull is a civil parish and a town in Sefton, Merseyside, England. It contains ten buildings that are recorded in the National Heritage List for England as designated listed buildings. Of these, one is listed at Grade II*, the middle of the three grades, and the others are at Grade II, the lowest grade.

The town developed after the arrival of the railway in 1849 and has become a dormitory town for Liverpool. In the late 19th and early 20th century a number of homes for the care of people suffering from epilepsy, and three of the houses used for this purpose are listed, namely, Chapel House, Manor House, and Harrison Home, the last being specially built for the purpose. The other listed buildings include structures associated with these houses, a church, a ruined chapel, and a memorial.

== Key ==
Grade	Criteria
II*	Particularly important buildings of more than special interest
II	Buildings of national importance and special interest

== Buildings ==
Name and location	Photograph	Date	Notes	Grade
Maghull Chapel; 53.51033°N 2.94340°W		Late 13th century	In the churchyard of St Andrew's Church are the remains of a medieval chapel of ease. Much of this has been demolished, and additions were made to the remains in 1883. The structure is in stone with stone-slate roofs, and consists of the original chancel and north chapel, and a bell turret created from the former nave.	II*
Arch attached to Manor House; 53.51063°N 2.95706°W	—	Late 13th century	The arch is part an arcade that was formerly in Maghull chapel and re-erected on the present site in 1885. The arch is in stone, it is double-chamfered, and carried on round piers.	II
Outbuilding, Chapel House; 53.51098°N 2.94231°W	—	17th century (probable)	The building is in stone, partly rendered, with a roof partly of stone-slate, and partly in asbestos. It is in two storeys, and in the east side there are four entrances and two pitch holes. On the right side is an external staircase.	II
Chapel House; 53.51127°N 2.94223°W	—	Mid to late 17th century (probable)	A farmhouse, later used as a residential home, in stone with a stone-slate roof. It has two storeys and four bays, the second bay projecting forward and forming a gabled porch. The porch contains a segmental-headed doorway, above which is a mullioned and transomed window. In the other bays the windows are mullioned, those in the upper storey being in half-dormers. On the left side are two large later windows.	II
Stone Structure, Manor House; 53.51144°N 2.95622°W	—	18th century (probable)	An approximately square ruined structure with no roof and collapsing walls, thought to be the remains of a folly. It is in stone with brick internal walls, and incorporates a stone lintel dated 1667.	II
Manor House; 53.51079°N 2.95677°W		Late 18th century	A former country house later used as a care home. It is in brick with stone dressings and a slate roof, and has two storeys, a basement, and an attic. The entrance front is in three bays, with a cornice and parapet at the top. Steps lead up to the central entrance, which has Doric columns, a decorated frieze, a pediment, and a fanlight. This is flanked by two-storey canted bay windows. In the attic are dormers and a glazed belvedere. The windows are sashes.	II
Sundial; 53.51027°N 2.94340°W	—	1827	The sundial is to the south of Maghull chapel, and is in stone. Standing on two square steps is a base carrying a square shaft with a moulded capital.	II
Harrison Monument; 53.51033°N 2.94299°W	—	1835	A memorial to members of the Harrison family. It is in stone, and consists of a truncated pyramid on a square base, standing on three steps. On the base are angle plinths with wreaths, and the pyramid has inscribed panels and palmettes.	II
St Andrew's Church; 53.51052°N 2.94278°W		1878–80	A church designed by James F. Doyle and extended in 1998. It is in stone with a slate roof, and is in the style of the 13th century. The church consists of a nave with a clerestory, aisles, a north porch and vestry, a chancel, and a west tower. The tower has a stair turret, clock faces on all sides, and a battlemented parapet.	II
Harrison Home; 53.51086°N 2.95093°W	—	1902	A care home in brick, roughcast above the ground floor, with sandstone dressings and a tiled roof. It is in two storeys with attics, and consists of a main range and a service wing at right angles, giving an L-shaped plan. The entrance front is multi-gabled, and at the rear is a garden front of seven bays; the alternate bays contain two-storey gabled bay windows, and the bays between have dormers. The service wing is in nine bays, and most of the windows are sashes. Many of the internal features have been retained.	II
