= Sefton Sixth Form College =

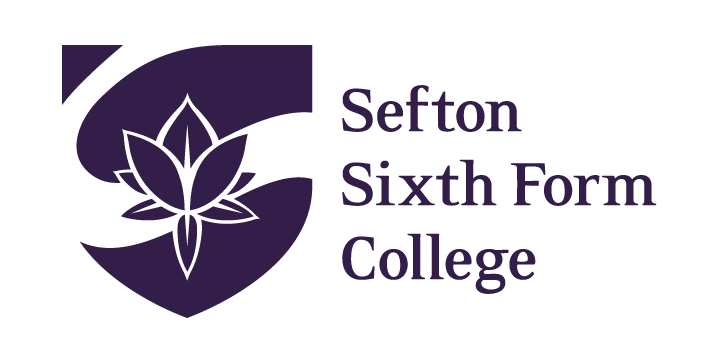

Location
- Sterrix Lane; Litherland, Merseyside, L30 2DB; England; 53.4817°N 2.9843°W

Information
- Type: Further Education
- Motto: Excellence through education.
- Established: 1 September 2009
- Local authority: Sefton
- Gender: Coeducational
- Age: 16 to 19
- Ofsted Inspection Result: "Outstanding"
- Website: www.seftonsixth.ac.uk

Sefton Sixth Form College is a sixth form college in Merseyside, England. It is a part of Hugh Baird College and was formerly known as the Hugh Baird College South Sefton Campus.

The college was founded in 2009, and offers a range of A-levels and Level 3 BTEC courses. The campus has science laboratories, a sports centre, a dance studio, eating outlets, a large atrium for performances and an art studio.

On 1 December 2017, following Sefton Council approval and support, South Sefton College became part of Hugh Baird College. South Sefton College was renamed as Hugh Baird College’s South Sefton Campus and it is home to the College’s dedicated Sixth Form Centre and houses its A-level provision.

On 1 August 2023, the Hugh Baird College South Sefton College was renamed Sefton Sixth Form College.

In 2025, Sefton Sixth Form College was awarded an 'Outstanding' grade by Ofsted, the highest grade possible.

South Sefton College was a foundation sixth form located in Litherland in the English county of Merseyside.

The college was established in 2009 following a major reorganisation of secondary education in the Metropolitan Borough of Sefton. An £11.8 million grant from the Learning and Skills Council funded the building of the college which was formally opened by Sophie, Countess of Wessex.

South Sefton College was officially a foundation school administered by Sefton Metropolitan Borough Council. The college catered for graduating students from secondary schools across the southern part of the Metropolitan Borough of Sefton.
