= Waterloo Partnership =

The Waterloo Partnership is a British charity based in Waterloo and Crosby areas of Liverpool raises money for its Sierra Leone namesake.

Sierra Leone has now emerged from a period of Civil War and is one of the poorest countries in the world.

The UK committee comprises several volunteers, including David Moorhead, Teresa McLaughlin and Fred Nye. Delegations, involving several members of the committee as well as some local teachers have visited Waterloo in recent years. Schools involved include Great Crosby, All Saints Primary and Merchant Taylors' .
