= Hugh Baird College =

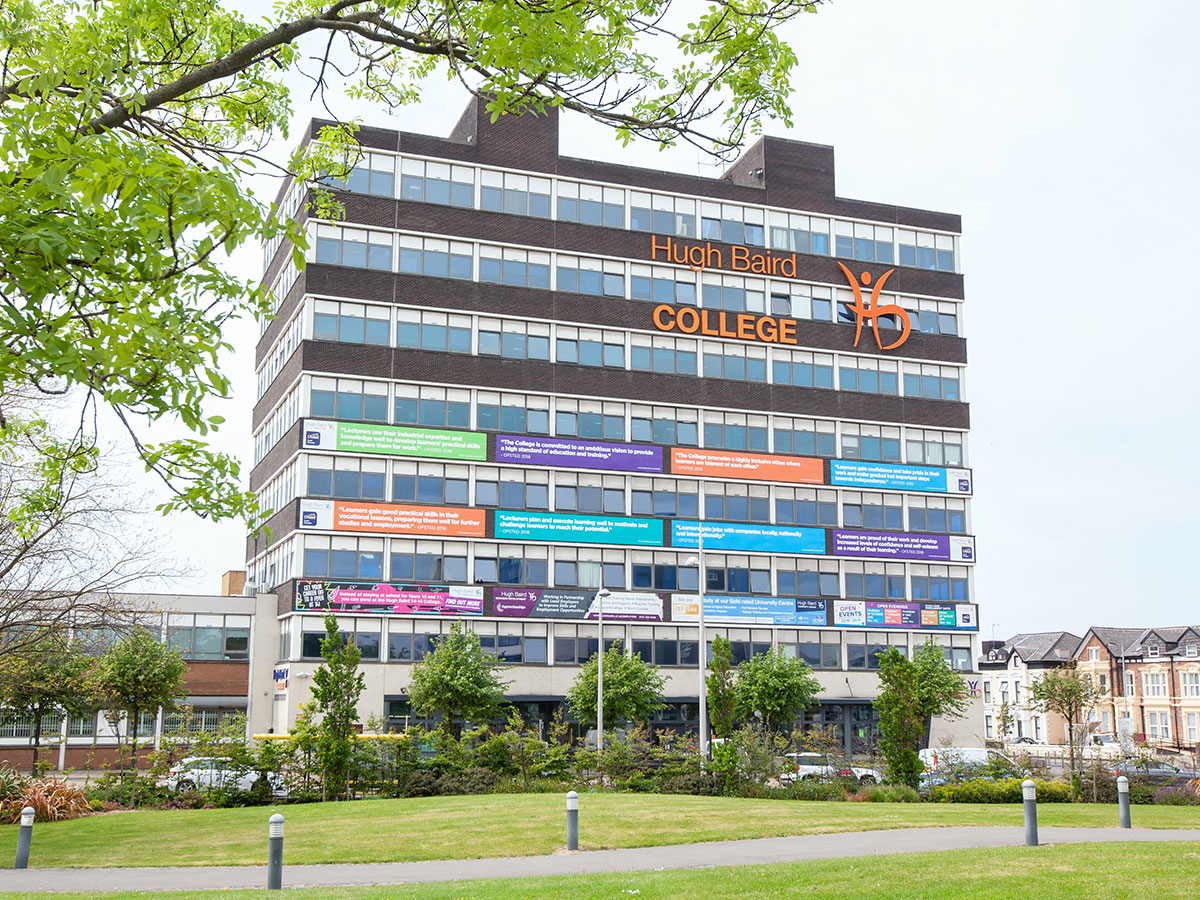

Location
- Liverpool City Region; Bootle, Merseyside, L20 7EW; England, United Kingdom; 53.445080°N 2.9894190°W

Information
- Type: Further Education, Higher Education
- Motto: To inspire, challenge and transform lives
- Founded: 1891
- Chair: Kerry Kirkwood
- Principal: Rachael Hennigan
- Employees: 700
- Age: 16+
- Enrollment: 5000
- Campuses: 4

Hugh Baird College is a college and university centre in Merseyside, England. It is one of the largest providers of education and training in the area, delivering over 300 courses to more than 5,000 students. The college offers courses from entry Level to Level 3, T-levels, A-levels, apprenticeships and university-level courses, foundation degrees and degrees.

On 1 December 2017, following Sefton Council approval and support, South Sefton College in Litherland became part of Hugh Baird College. South Sefton College was renamed as Hugh Baird College's South Sefton Campus. The college's sixth form is based there. This centre was renamed Sefton Sixth Form College on 1 August 2023.

== History ==
In 1891, Grants were made available from the Exchequer, which coupled with additional financial aid, allowed Bootle Technical School to open, offering 37 courses in 25 subjects with an intake of 807 students. Additional subjects were added to the Schools provision in 1897, including: building, home dressmaking, mechanical engineering and iron/steel manufacture. On 27 September 1900, a new building was erected and officially opened by Earl Derby under the directorship of John James Ogle. It was located where the Port Academy Liverpool building now stands. Bootle Municipal Technical College amalgamated with Bootle College of Art in 1968 to become the Bootle College for Further Education.

Hugh Baird College opened in 1974, with the council deciding to name it after Councillor Hugh Baird due to his commitment to scholarship in the region. Hugh Baird had been a member of Bootle Council for 30 years and at the time of opening, was the leader of Bootle Council and the chairman of the Transport Committee on the newly established Merseyside County Council. In 1988, a sports hall opened, followed by the £5 million Pembroke Centre in 1997 (now known as the Port Academy Liverpool building), with an extension in 2009.

In 2013, the L20 Hotel School launched, providing education, training and work experience for students on hospitality courses. Shortly after in 2014 was the official opening of the Hugh Baird University Centre, the first purpose-built Higher Education centre in Merseyside. The Hugh Baird University Centre achieved Teaching Excellence Framework (TEF) ‘Gold’ status for their teaching provision in 2017, which is the highest award possible in recognition of the outstanding quality of their staff and curriculum.

In 2017, South Sefton College in Litherland became part of Hugh Baird College. South Sefton College was renamed as Hugh Baird College's South Sefton Campus and it is home to the college's dedicated Sixth Form Centre and houses its A-level provision. Their Healthcare Campus opened in 2019, housing the college's Health Training Hub and Mersey Care NHS Foundation Trust's Life Rooms Bootle.

In 2020, the government chose Hugh Baird College as the only education provider in the Liverpool City Region to deliver new technical qualifications called T Levels.

In 2025, Hugh Baird College was awarded an 'Outstanding' grade from Ofsted, the highest grade possible.

== Campuses ==
The Balliol Road Campus serves the majority of the college's students within its Balliol building, with 7 floors, including the main reception and 'The Pod' student support centre. The Port Academy Liverpool building specialises in the training of vocational courses for the Construction and Engineering sectors. The University Centre is on Stanley Road, it houses a dedicated University Centre with open-plan study areas for students studying University level courses. The development also includes a multi-purpose performance arts space for public events - ranging from school productions to conferences, a public library, learning resource centre and a café with an outdoor seating area. The Port Academy Liverpool building houses the college's Business Development Centre which provides apprenticeships and training to employers across the region. The L20 Hotel School provides education, training and work experience for students on catering and hospitality courses.

The Sefton Sixth Form College in Litherland opened in 2009 and houses a Sixth Form Centre, where the college offers A-levels. The campus has science laboratories, a sports centre, dance studio, eating outlets, an atrium for performances and an art studio.

Healthcare Campus houses the college's Health Training Hub, The Marina Dalglish Centre and Mersey Care NHS Foundation Trust's Life Rooms Bootle. The Health Training Hub and The Marina Dalglish Centre are where their health, social care, healthcare science, science, nursing and mental health courses are delivered. The Life Rooms is a resource for the local community to access short courses, information and advice about physical and mental wellbeing, money, housing and community services.

Thornton College is a partnership between Sefton Metropolitan Borough Council, Sefton special school and Hugh Baird College. It is based in Thornton, Merseyside and offers courses from Entry Level to Level 1 for students with learning difficulties and/or disabilities.

== Commercial facilities ==
L20 Restaurant
The Restaurant is located in the Balliol building and is run by the Hospitality students of the L20 Hotel School.

L20 The Salon Academy
The salon is open to the general public and students.

== Notable alumni ==
- Joe Benton
- Pete Burns
- Chris Butler
- Peter Dowd
- Kevin Ellison
- Rebecca Ferguson
- Nisha Katona
- Ronnie Moran
- Paul Morrison
