= Maghull =

Town in Merseyside, England

Coordinates: 53.5174°N 2.9449°W

- Town
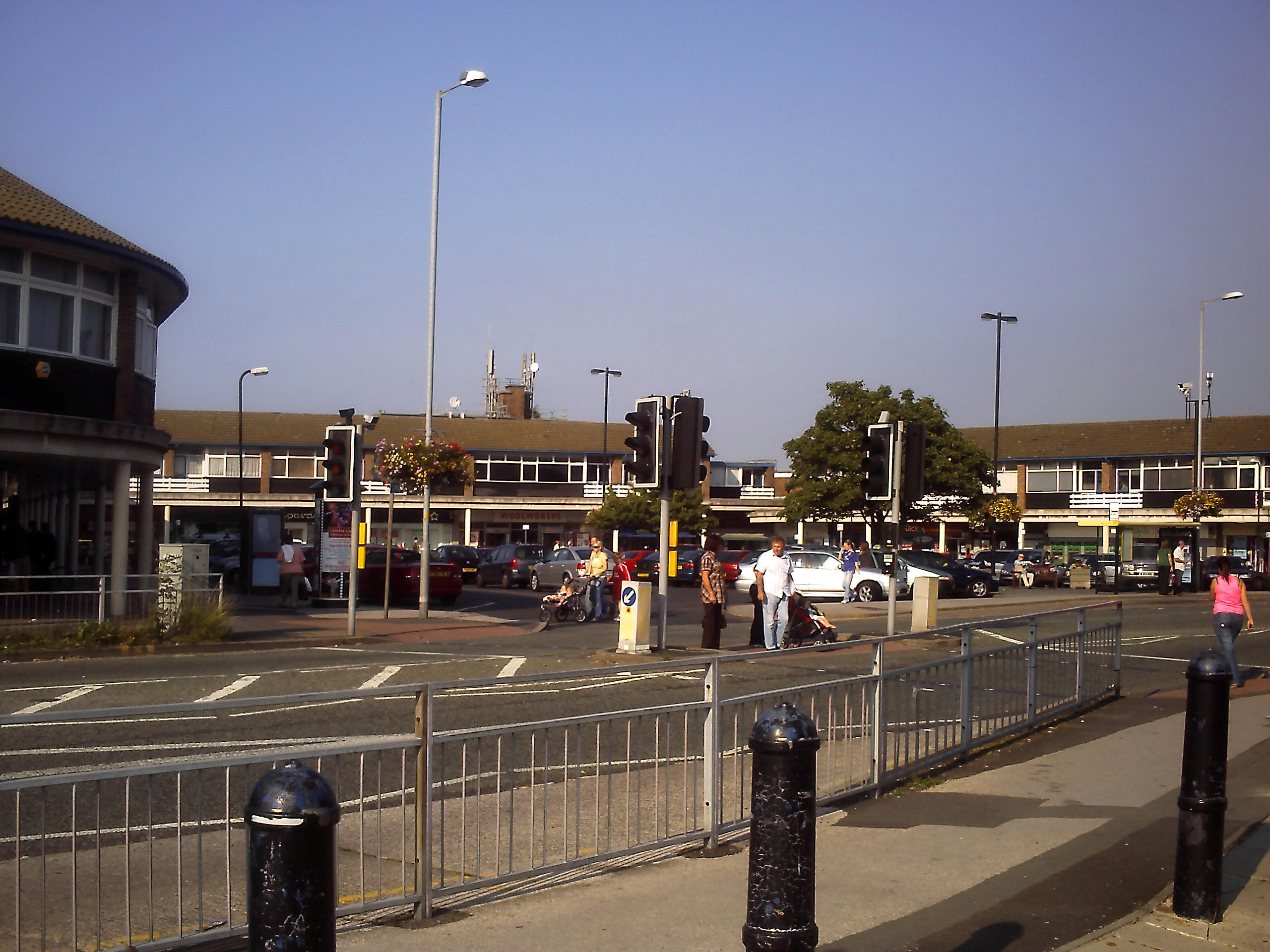
- Central Square, Maghull

- Location within Merseyside
- Population: 20,444 (2011)
- OS grid reference: SD373027
- Civil parish: Maghull
- Metropolitan borough: Sefton
- Metropolitan county: Merseyside
- Region: North West
- Country: England
- Sovereign state: United Kingdom
- Districts of the town: List: Kennessee Green; Lydiate; Moss Side; Sefton (Village)
- Post town: LIVERPOOL
- Postcode district: L31
- Dialling code: 0151
- Police: Merseyside
- Fire: Merseyside
- Ambulance: North West
- UK Parliament: Sefton Central

Maghull (/məˈɡʌl/ mə-GUL) is a town and civil parish in Sefton, Merseyside, England. The town is north of Liverpool and west of Kirkby. The town is also the location of Ashworth Hospital.

Maghull had a population of 20,444 at the 2011 Census. Housing in the town is almost entirely a 20th-century settlement of semi-detached and detached housing, although remains of the original town do exist. The town has had an elected council since the Local Government Act 1894, when the government set up a network of local governance across England. Following the Local Government Act 1974, the council changed its name from a parish to a town council.

== Etymology ==
It has been proposed by Dr Eilert Ekwall that the name Maghull may have been derived from the Celtic word magos referring to a plain or field, and the Old English halh referring to a corner or nook, giving the meaning of a "flat land in a bend". Another theorised origin is Anglo-Saxon mægðe to refer to mayweed.

== History ==
The original settlement, consisting of fifty people and six square miles of agricultural settlement, was established prior to the Domesday Survey of 1086 where the town is recorded as Magele on a ridge of high ground, that can be most clearly seen at Red Lion Bridge towards the centre of the town and the Leeds and Liverpool Canal follows it on the plain and the A5147 on the brow. This ridge marks the edge of the flood plain of the River Alt, providing protection from flooding and access to this fertile pasture of the plain. A church is known to have existed in the area in 1100 although it has been rebuilt at least once and the chapel still stands, in the churchyard of the Victorian St Andrew's and is the oldest ecclesiastical building in Merseyside still in regular use for worship but in 1756 the mediaeval nave of Maghull Chapel was pulled down with a Roman Catholic dual-purpose school-chapel opening in 1890 near Massey's Barn.

It is noted that in 1568 Maghull Moss was divided between Sir Richard Molyneux of Melling and Edward Hulme of Maghull. The boundary of Maghull was, in the north, Maghull Brook and to the south, Melling Brook; the west was marked by the River Alt. At the eastern edge, however, the boundary was ill-defined on the moorland and due to the value of turf from the moss as a vital fuel this caused regular disputes between both Maghull and Melling Manors. Maghull Manor House was built in 1638 and local tradition has it that Charles II slept there during a visit to the area but by 1780 a new manor house had been built near the site of the original and it still stands in the grounds of Maghull Homes with part of the original moat.

It is also recorded that by 1667 the population of Maghull had increased to 599 with 136 houses and 127 families and by 1770 initial work had begun on the Leeds and Liverpool Canal with the first sod being cut by the Honourable Charles Lewis Mordaunt. The actual spot lies in a rock cutting 400 metres to the east of Halsall Hill Bridge. Soon after, the Red Lion public house was built in Maghull to serve the canal trade. It became a café and general store in the 20th century and was demolished after the Second World War. Several other canalside pubs were built over the years; for example, near Hall Lane Bridge there was the Traveller's Rest (demolished 1936) and the Horse and Jockey in Melling. In 1774, the canal had reached Maghull and provided it with its second connection to Liverpool. The arrival of the canal created new industry in the area, notably quarrying of sandstone and clay extraction. It also bolstered the local hostelry trade.

Maghull's first school was founded in 1668 in a small cottage in School Lane with the headmaster being Humphries Webster, showing the town's emergence although County Rates from 1716 said of the town "Maghull doth always bear and pay a third less than either Down Holland or Lidyeat". This shows that Maghull was a developing community, but still not as rich as its neighbours Downholland and Lydiate. Economic development continued with the Molyneux family (Earls of Sefton) being significantly active in bringing about the Alt Drainage Act in 1779 which resulted in many acres of marshland along the river eventually becoming good agricultural land. This had led to the growth of the population to 534, with about half the employment being in trade rather than agriculture and a rise in 1815 to a population of 720 people with 71 families engaged in agriculture and 29 in trade, manufactures and handicrafts. There were 108 inhabited houses.

By the 1820s, horse racing was well established on land in Maghull. Old Racecourse Farm later became the site for the Meadows Hotel; and Old Racecourse Road, off Sefton Lane, commemorates the sport. Baines' Directory of Lancashire in 1825 provided the first list of specialist male occupations in Maghull – 1 blacksmith, 1 cooper, 1 tailor, 1 land surveyor and 1 wheelwright.

By 1840 the agriculture of the area had changed from animal to arable farming and the 1861 National Census the population stood at 1,222. Due to this increase in population the railway came to Maghull in 1849, with a station on the Liverpool, Ormskirk and Preston Railway as well as the construction of the town's first police station which was set up by Lancashire County Council in 1870 and the town got a second station in 1884, Sefton and Maghull, on the newly built Cheshire Lines Committee Southport & Cheshire Lines Extension Railway to Southport, the line was an extension of the North Liverpool Extension Line. A large section of embankment has been destroyed to make space for Switch Island. In 1933 Northway (A59 road) was built, initially as a tree-lined single carriageway but dualled in the early 1960s, which bisects Maghull, taking travellers from Liverpool to Ormskirk off 'Liverpool Road'. The arrival of Northway triggered an increased rate of expansion in Maghull.

In 1939, the IRA blew up the swing bridge at Green Lane on the canal but the strategic significance of this has never been fully explained due to Maghull's relative insignificance. In the Second World War, three bombs landed, one adjacent to King George V Playing Fields, on the site of the former residential home, and one in Ormonde Drive and one in the middle of The Meadows Hotel bowling green A house that was then 16 Park Lane (now 321, the houses were renumbered in the late 1960s or early 1970s), Moss Side, was also destroyed; it was rebuilt in the 1950s. It served as a refuge for up to 6,000 people a night from Bootle. American and Polish army units were stationed in Maghull and it also held several camps for displaced persons. Park Lane TB sanatorium and a hospital, built to treat shell shock victims, were combined to form Ashworth Hospital and one hundred patients transferred from Rampton Secure Hospital with it remaining a secure hospital to this day, holding such patients as Ian Brady. In 2010, plans were announced by the Labour government that new housing was needed and Sefton East – where Maghull is – was chosen as one of the locations for the new homes. Sefton Metropolitan Borough Council showcased the plans at various locations around south Sefton, and were met by local opposition.

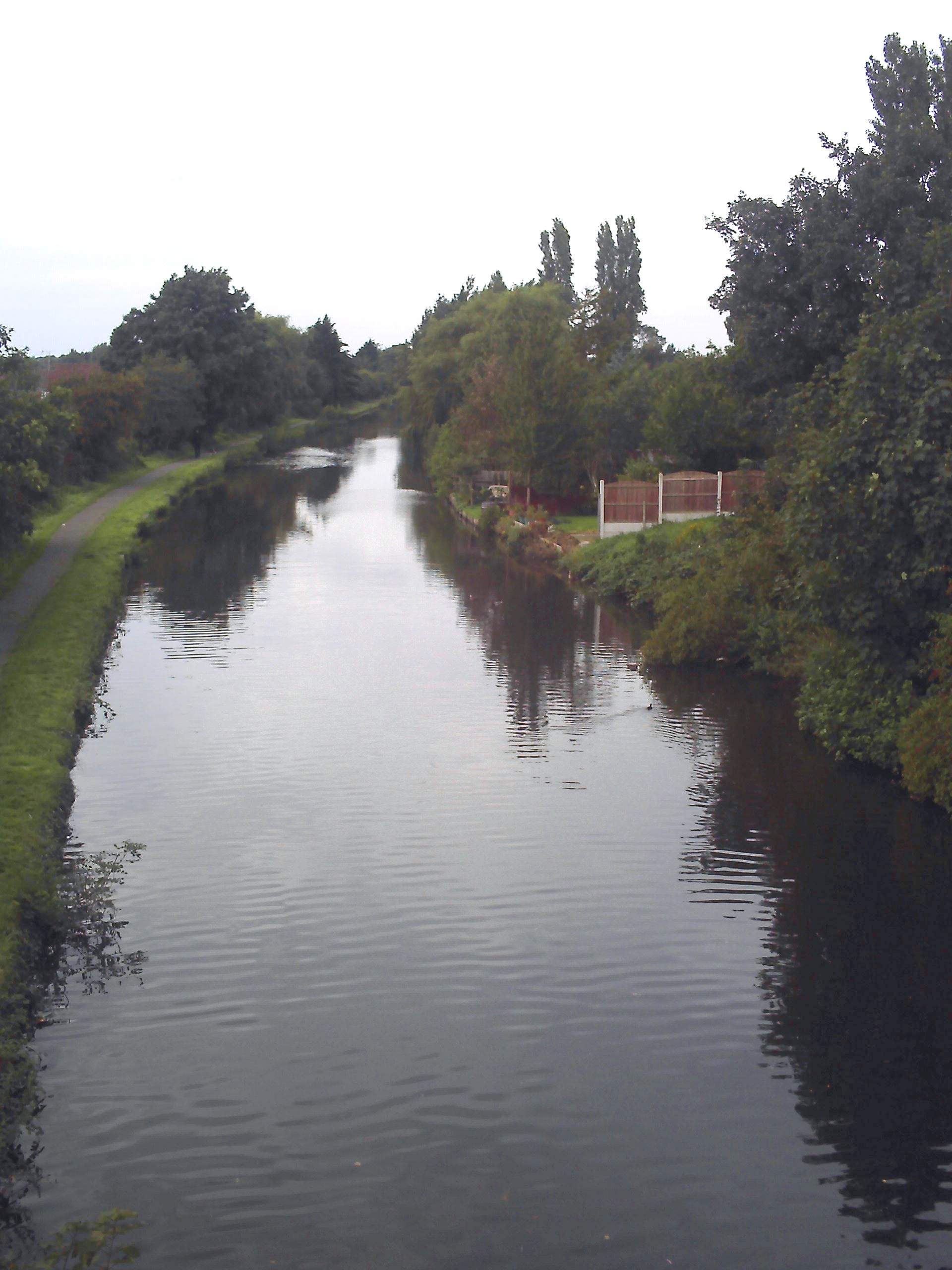
The Leeds and Liverpool Canal at Maghull looking towards Leeds from Westway Bridge

== Geography ==
Maghull is seven miles north-northeast of Liverpool city centre. To the northwest is Lydiate, to the east Melling, to the south Aintree and Netherton and to the west the Mersey Forest and Sefton village. Maghull is separated from the rest of the Greater Liverpool sprawl by a green belt which runs across the Switch Island motorway junction and through which flows the River Alt.

== Governance ==
In 1912, the Maghull & District Conservative Club was founded on Station Road; it still stands today. The Maghull Labour Party was formed in 1928. Maghull has been governed as part of the Borough of Sefton since the Local Government Act 1974, when the boundaries were redrawn. Maghull moved from Lancashire into Merseyside. Maghull has had an elected council since the Local Government Act 1894 when the government set up a network of local councils across England. Following the Local Government Act 1974, the council changed its name from a parish to a town council and remains the second largest town council in England. Maghull has worked with the neighbouring parishes and villages, as well as Sefton Metropolitan Borough Council under the banner of the Altside Business Village, to give businesses in the areas a united voice and to promote tourism in the area. For this scheme, Maghull works with Aintree, Lydiate, Melling and Sefton Village; all of which are connected geographically as being near the River Alt – hence the name Altside, and politically as they are all in the eastern parishes of Sefton borough. By 1971 the population of the town stood at 22,794 and gave Maghull the largest population of any civil parish in the country.

Maghull also has a town council, established by the 1974 Local Government Act. The town council is composed of councillors elected every four years. The council has been under the control of Labour since the 2011 local elections. Since 2019 it has the following make up 12 Labour, 2 Conservatives and 2 Independent Councillors. Maghull town council is made up of four wards: East which elects five councillors, West which elects four councillors, North which elects five councillors, and South which elects two Councillors

Maghull also falls into Maghull East, Lydiate & Maghull West, and Aintree & Maghull South Wards on Sefton Metropolitan Borough Council. There are 3 Borough Councillors to each of these wards. The ward names have been recently renamed, due the revised boundary changes.

== Education ==
Education in the town began with William Harper founding the Maghull School in Damfield Lane, the location of Maricourt Catholic High School, in 1815 under the terms of his will. In 1839, the National School, later St Andrew's Church of England School, was built and the earlier school, a small cottage, which still stands, became the headmaster's house. Money for the school, which cost £450 7s 0d (£450.35p), was raised by local subscription and the schoolmistress was paid £5 a year, and each scholar had to pay one penny (1d) a month towards the cost of a fire, and tuppence (2d) a month for pens and ink, if they were being taught to write but by 1873 a second storey was added to the school to accommodate the growing population. In 1957, the Sisters of Mercy created the Maricourt Catholic High School with all students initially taught in Quarry Brook House with an initial intake of only twelve girls. In 1982, Old Hall High School, formerly Maghull Grammar School, was merged with Ormonde Drive High School to form Maghull High School, concentrating on the Ormonde Drive site. Today Maghull contains several primary schools including State, Roman Catholic and Church of England schools. There are also three high schools which all contain independent Sixth Form facilities, working together as part of the Maghull Collaborative. These secondary schools being Deyes High School, Maghull High School and Maricourt Catholic High School. As well as serving Maghull, the secondary schools serve pupils from the neighbouring towns in south Sefton, and the neighbouring local authorities of the Metropolitan Borough of Knowsley and Liverpool.

== Transport ==
Maghull is bisected by the A59 road and is served by Maghull railway station and the Maghull North railway station, along with bus routes to the nearby areas of Kirkby, Southport, Ormskirk and Liverpool city centre with most running past or near Maghull Square. The M57 and M58 motorways start at Switch Island, between Aintree and Maghull. The Leeds and Liverpool Canal runs through the centre of old Maghull. The Trans Pennine Trail, a long-distance footpath from Southport to Hornsea, near Hull skirts Maghull, following the line of the old Cheshire Lines railway.

== Shopping ==
Maghull saw some regeneration during the early 1990s with the creation of a central square shopping region. Over the road from the new shopping square was Clent House, then owned by farmer John Cropper who sold the land and property around 1993 to the local authorities. Cropper's family had owned the land for generations, while their house was fronted by a "picturesque delf, ringed by trees" and was considered among the more beautiful parts of Maghull. Plans to regenerate the site were set in motion to provide needed amenities for the area, with a new police station and council offices among the suggestions.

Maghull is presently served by the Central Square Shopping Centre, which is based in the northwest of Maghull, which is the original town centre. Known locally as "the square", it contains several shops, a police station, numerous banks and nearby is a Morrisons supermarket. In Kennessee Green there is a shopping area called Tree View Court. There are also the Meadows shops near to Maghull Town Hall and Deyes Lane shops near the end of Deyes Lane, about five or ten minutes walking distance from Deyes High School.

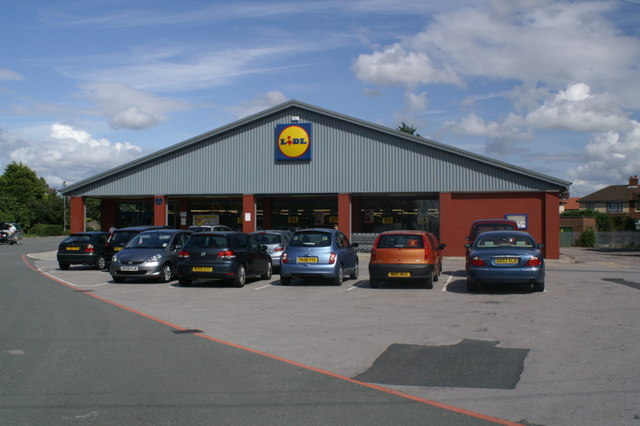
Supermarket

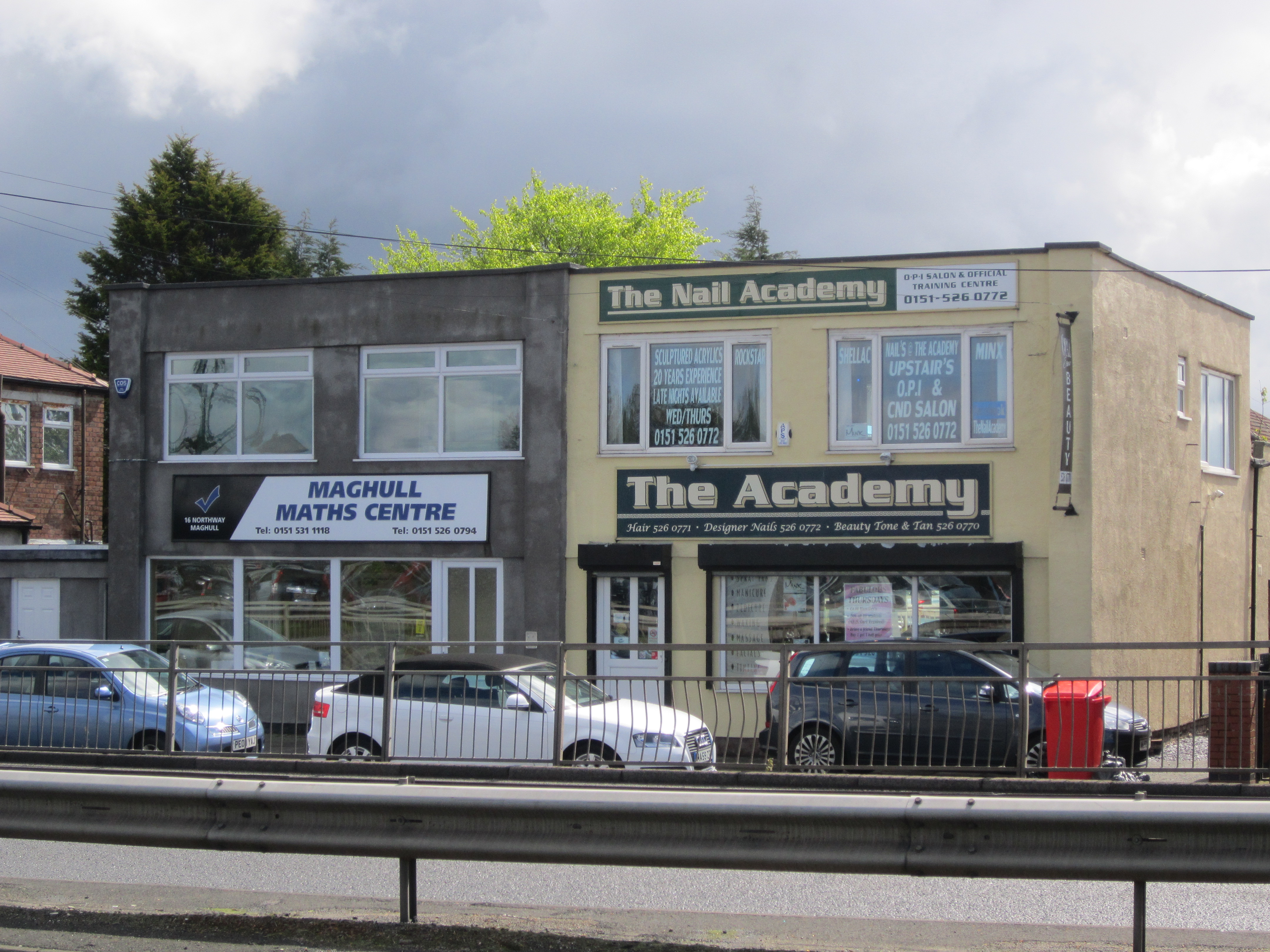
Shops

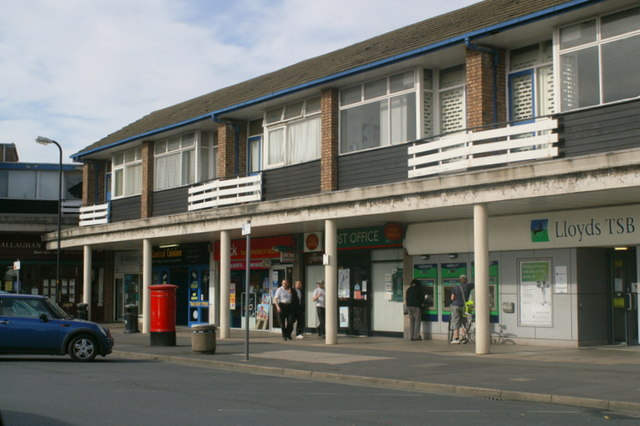
Maghull Square

== Community ==
In 1929, the Maghull Townswomen's Guild was formed. It later became the Maghull Summerhill Townswomen's Guild and was a Registered Charity, but closed in 2014. The Maghull Community Association on Green Lane provides live entertainment, family fun days and special events such as Christmas parties and ladies nights. In 2009, Maghull Town Hall was given a large extension costing £8.2million, and which included a library and sports facilities.

== Media ==
The main local newspaper is the Liverpool Echo, a tabloid published by the Trinity Mirror group. There are also two local newspapers, the Aintree & Maghull Champion and the Maghull Star, both of which are free and are delivered every week either on a Wednesday or a Thursday.

Local news and television programmes are provided by BBC North West and ITV Granada, the local television station TalkLiverpool also broadcasts to the area. Television signals are received from the Winter Hill TV transmitter.

Local radio stations are BBC Radio Merseyside, Heart North West, Capital Liverpool, Hits Radio Liverpool, Smooth North West and Greatest Hits Radio Liverpool & The North West. An online radio station, Maghull Radio, has been running since February 2014 in partnership with Maghull Council and Maghull Community Enterprise. This radio station broadcasts live from Maghull Town Hall and has a variety of shows that combine music, both mainstream and niche, as well as talk shows including news and sport updates.

== Filming location ==
Due to its location and amenities, Maghull has become for popular location for filming.

- Help (2021 television film)
- Anthony
- Sometimes Always Never
- The Responder Series 2 (between September and December 2023)

== Sport ==
Maghull's sport facilities include bowls and tennis next to the town hall and Maghull F.C. and cricket clubs playing at Old Hall Field. Maghull Cricket Club was founded in 1926 and after playing friendly cricket for the 50 years of their existence started playing league cricket in the 1970s. After moving through various junior leagues, they joined the Liverpool and District Competition in 1999. The 1st XI gained promotion to the ECB Premier League in 2001 before being relegated in 2004. In 2005, they won the First Division title for the 2nd time and rejoined the Premier league in 2006. They were relegated in 2008.

The 3rd and 4th teams play at the Parkhaven Trust, which is situated a few hundred metres from the main Old Hall pitch.

Maghull F.C. joined the Lancashire Combination in 1972. In the 1978–79 season, they joined Cheshire County League as founder members of Division Two, while they were founder members of North West Counties League in 1982–83. In 1992–93, they were North West Counties League Division Two Champions but were not promoted due to ground gradings. They left to join the West Cheshire League in 1999–00.

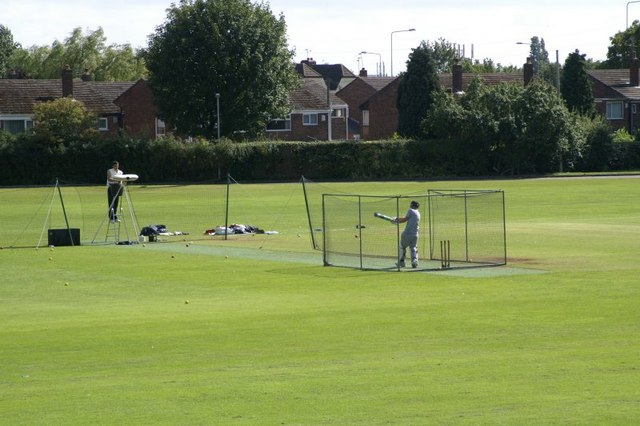
Cricket Pitch

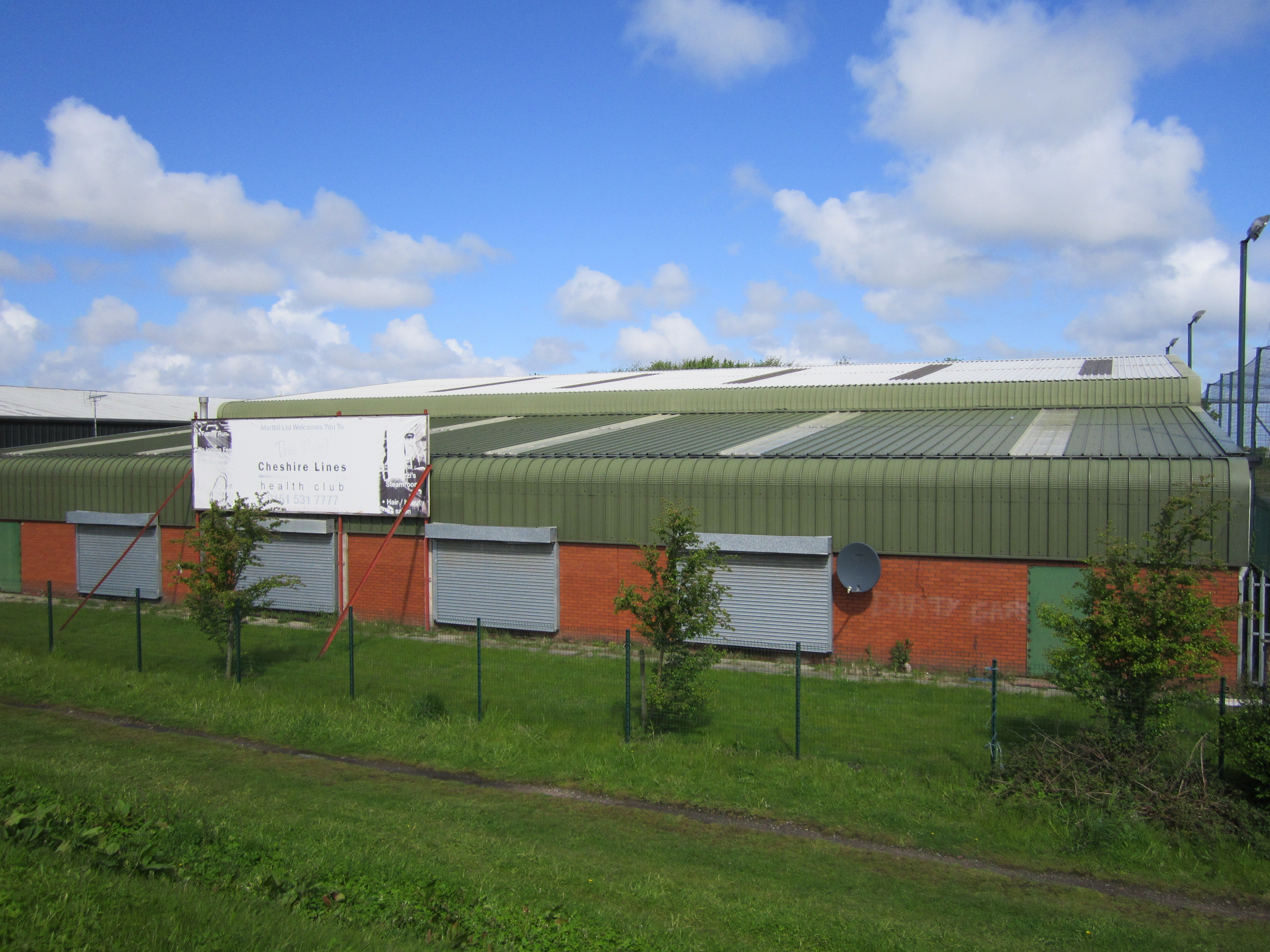
Gym

== Notable people ==
- The Beatles performed live on one occasion at the Albany Cinema in October 1961; the compere was Ken Dodd. The site is now a Lidl supermarket.
- John Lennon lived with relatives at Cedar Grove, Maghull, for a short while, as a result of family issues.
- Frank Hornby, of Hornby Railways, Dinky Toy and Meccano fame, lived in Maghull, first at "The Hollies" in Station Road, and later at the much larger "Quarry Brook". This house is also on Station Road, close to Maghull railway station and is now the Sixth Form for Maricourt Catholic High School. "The Hollies" was the first building outside London to be awarded a Blue plaque. He is buried in St Andrew's churchyard along with his wife and daughter.
- William Vestey of Blue Star Line also lived at "Quarry Brook" before the Hornby family.

=== Football ===
Several Liverpool and Everton footballers have lived in the area, including Ian Callaghan, Duncan Ferguson, Brian Labone, Steve Staunton, Gordon West, Mick Lyons, Joe Parkinson, Roger Hunt, Tommy Wright, Roger Kenyon, John Hurst, Peter Thompson, Terry Darracott, Steve Heighway, Tony Hateley and Ian St John.

- Nathan Eccleston – English footballer who played as a striker for Liverpool, and lives in Maghull.
- Jordan Rossiter - English footballer who played as a midfielder for Liverpool and now Rangers.
- Mark Hateley – footballer and England international lived in Maghull on Shop Lane, spent two spells at Lambshear Lane Primary School (now Lydiate Primary School).
- Alex Curran-Gerrard – wife of Liverpool and England footballer Steven Gerrard, lived most of her life in Aintree but attended Maghull High School.

=== Music ===
- Heidi Range, member of the Sugababes, attended Maricourt High School.
- Echo & the Bunnymen – guitarist Will Sergeant who grew up in nearby Melling attended Maghull's Deyes High School, as did Les Pattinson bassist in Echo & the Bunnymen and Teardrop Explodes drummer Gary Dwyer and keyboard player Paul Simpson who was later the singer in the Wild Swans, as well as the original drummer in the Farm, Andy McVann.
- Steve Grimes, guitarist with The Farm attended Maghull Grammar School.
- David Turner, who attended Woodend Primary School and Maghull High School, went on to join SKA supergroup Bad Manners and enjoy an international music and recording career
- Clifford Ennis, who attended Woodend Primary school went on to form goth band Subterfuge, then joined alternative group Ikon and later formed Razorfade with Mark Tansley of Suspiria after emigrating to Australia.
- All the original members of the band Apollo 440 either lived or went to school in Maghull – Noko and James Gardner – lived in Maghull and attended Old Hall High School (later Maghull High) and brothers Howard Gray and Trevor Gray from Aintree both attended Old Hall High School.

=== Other connections ===
- James Graham – St. Helens and GB rugby league player, attended Deyes High School. Played 9 seasons in Australia at the Canterbury-Bankstown Bulldogs and St. George Illawarra Dragons clubs.
- David Price – Rugby Union player at Orrell R.U.F.C. attended Maricourt High School.
- Stephen Darby – Liverpool F.C. youth player who played for Bolton Wanderers F.C., brought up in Maghull. On 18 September 2018, Darby announced his retirement from professional football at the age of 29 after being diagnosed with motor neurone disease. He is married to Manchester City WC captain Steph Houghton.
- Charlotte Jackson – family of British journalist and television presenter, currently a presenter on Sky Sports News and originates from Maghull.
- Bill Dean – actor who appeared as Harry Cross in the soap Brookside.
- Eddie Hemmings Sky TV Rugby League commentator.
- Isaac Roberts – astronomer.
- Rafael Sabatini – novelist, lived in Station Road, Maghull.
- Zack Gibson - WWE wrestler grew up in Maghull and attended Deyes High School

== See also ==
- Listed buildings in Maghull
