= Deyes High School =

Location
- Deyes Lane; Maghull, Merseyside, L31 6DE; England; 53°30′51″N 2°56′25″W

Information
- Former name: Maghull Deyes Lane County Secondary Modern
- Type: Academy
- Motto: Primus Inter Pares (First Among Equals)
- Established: March 1939
- Local authority: Sefton
- Trust: Lydiate Learning Trust
- Department for Education URN: 137533 Tables
- Ofsted: Reports
- Head of School: Victoria Beaney
- Gender: Coeducational
- Age: 11 to 18
- Enrolment: 1379
- Colours: Blue, White, and Red
- Website: http://www.deyeshigh.co.uk/

Deyes High School is a coeducational secondary school and sixth form situated in Maghull on the outskirts of Liverpool, England.

== History ==
The school was opened in March 1939 by Sir Peter Meadon, Lancashire's director of education at a cost of £30,000. The school was later named Maghull Deyes Lane County Secondary School before the reorganisation as a comprehensive school in September 1972. A teaching block was extensively damaged by fire in October 1974. The school's swimming pool opened in January 1976, four months later than originally planned and costing around £200,000.

Previously a community school administered by Sefton Metropolitan Borough Council, in October 2011 Deyes High School converted to academy status. The school is now sponsored by the Lydiate Learning Trust.

== Buildings ==
Deyes High School had seven buildings among its grounds; Lydiate, Molyneux, Unsworth, Sefton, Allen, College and Maths buildings.

The Lydiate Building was the first part of the school to be erected and for many years had a large quadrangle in its centre, housing a variety of animals, including peacocks.

The Sefton Building is split into two sections: the newer section houses the Religious Education and History departments, and the other has a small Geography department and the oldest of the Science rooms.

The Unsworth Building is made up of 3 buildings. Departments such as Information Communication Technology, Music, Physical Education and Performing Arts all have a place inside three unified buildings. The main school hall is situated in the Unsworth building, forming the main part and centre of the school.

The Molyneux building is currently closed. It is 3 storeys tall and was home to the Modern Foreign Languages, and Science departments. The ground floor of the building has two rooms dedicated to Learning Mentors. The middle floor was occupied by AMPSCITT, until its closure.

The Allen building is the Technology building with one room being used as an ICT room as well. This building was opened in 2003.

A new single school building opened in April 2024, on the site of the school field. The old buildings are currently in the process of being demolished.

== Notable former pupils ==
- James Graham, St Helens and GB rugby league player
- Will Sergeant, guitarist for Echo & the Bunnymen
- Les Pattinson, bassist for Echo & the Bunnymen
- Paul Simpson, singer for The Wild Swans and keyboard player for Teardrop Explodes
- Chris Butler, Academy Award nominated and Golden Globe winning filmmaker of Paranorman and Missing Link
- Harry McHugh, footballer for Wigan Athletic
