= Litherland =

Coordinates: 53.4727°N 2.9990°W

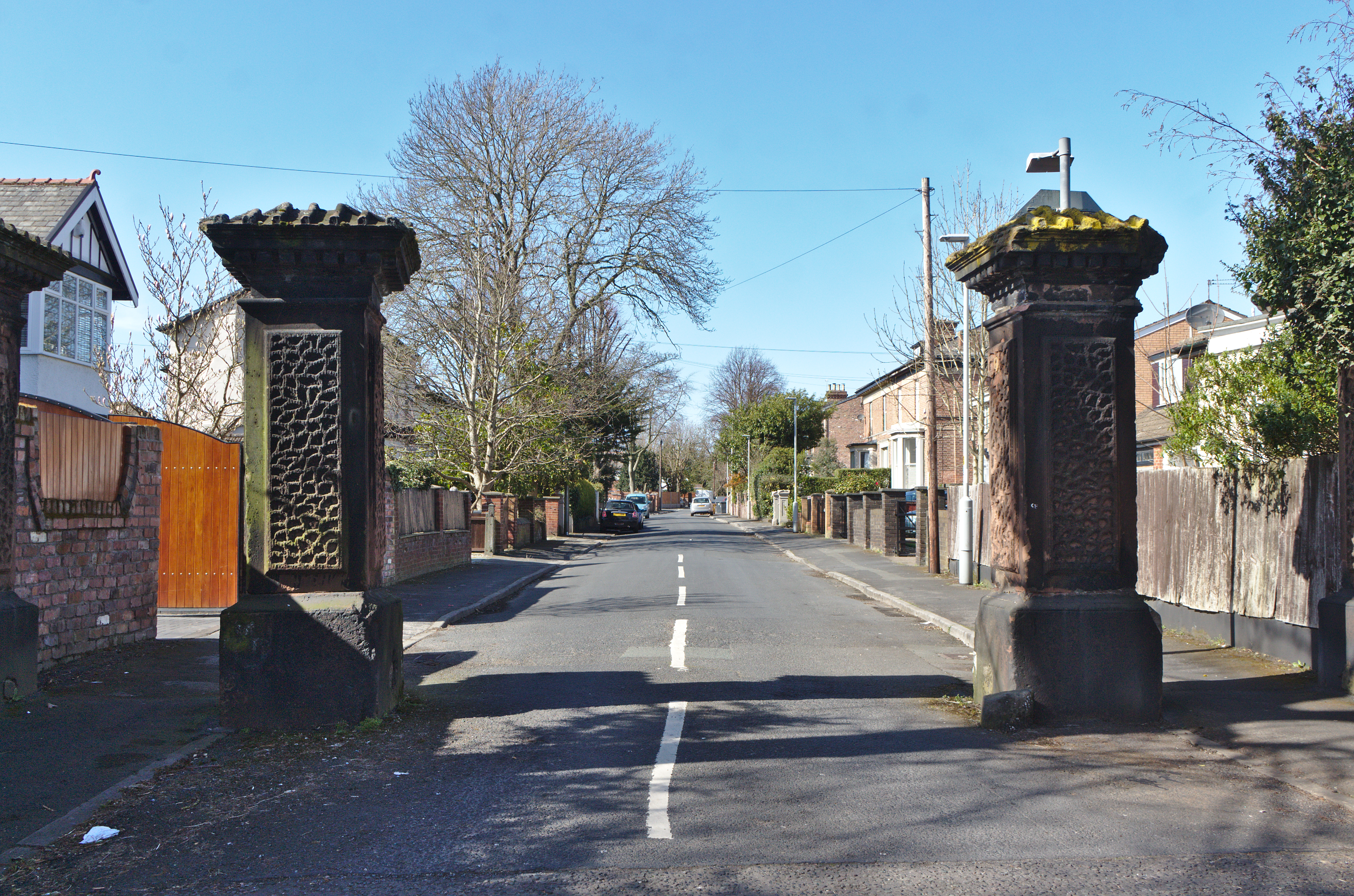
- Pair of rusticated stone gate piers at the entrance to Litherland Park opposite School Lane.

- Location within Merseyside
- Population: 22,242 (2001)
- OS grid reference: SJ340944
- Metropolitan borough: Sefton
- Metropolitan county: Merseyside
- Region: North West
- Country: England
- Sovereign state: United Kingdom
- Post town: LIVERPOOL
- Postcode district: L21
- Dialling code: 0151
- Police: Merseyside
- Fire: Merseyside
- Ambulance: North West
- UK Parliament: Bootle

Litherland is a town in the Metropolitan Borough of Sefton, Merseyside. Until 1974, it was within the historic county of Lancashire. It was an urban district, which included Seaforth and Ford. It neighbours Waterloo to the north, Seaforth to the west, and Bootle to the south and is approximately 5 miles (8.0 km) north of Liverpool city centre.

== History ==
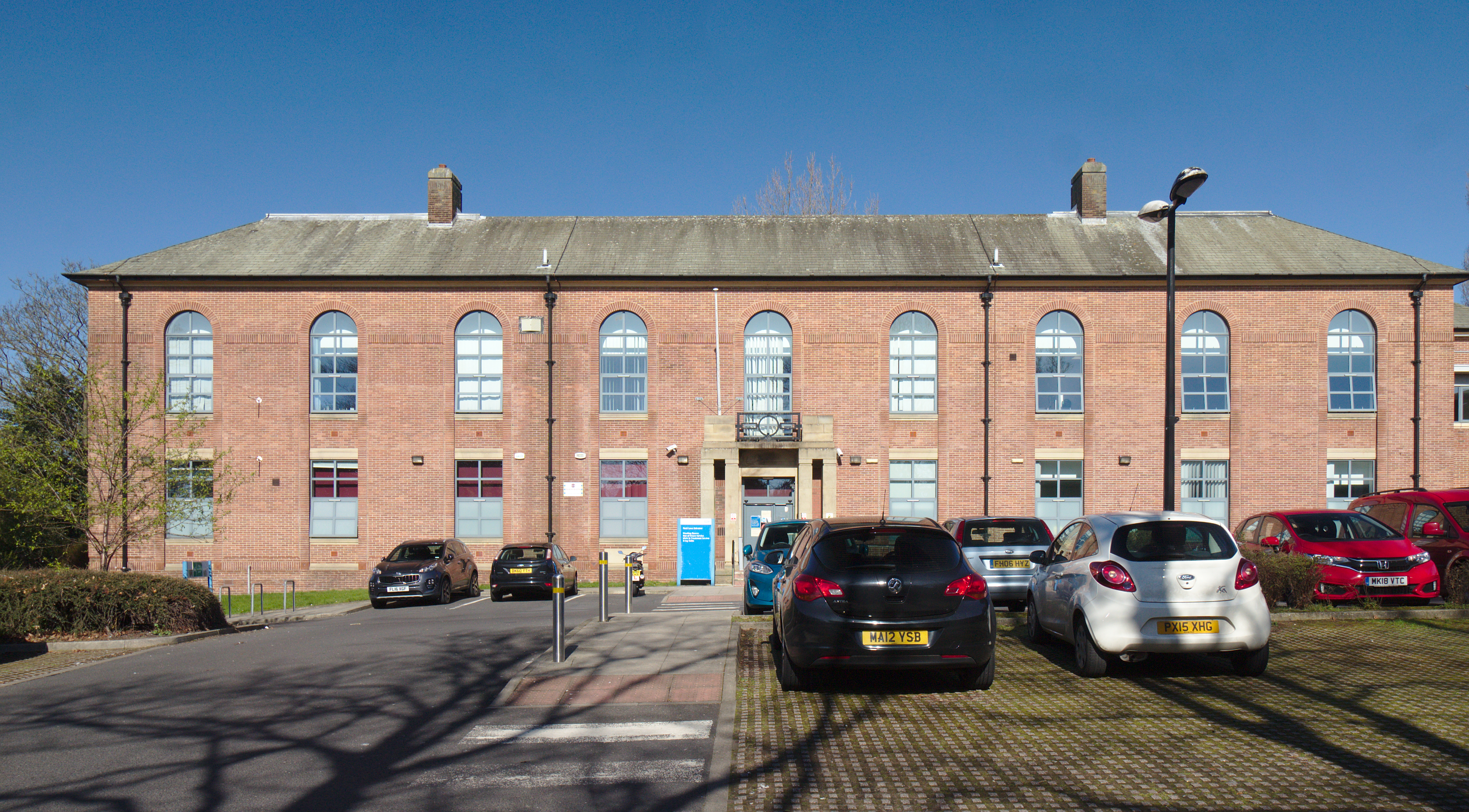
Litherland Town Hall

The name Litherland derives from two elements, Old Norse hlið/hlith-ar, which means "slope", and Old English land, "land".

Litherland was mentioned in the Domesday Book of 1086 as Liderlant, however there was no mention of Liverpool at that time. The first manor of Litherland consisted of one half and two quarters, the areas being Litherland including what is now Seaforth (the half) and present day Orrell and Ford (the two quarters).

Litherland remained a poor area until the arrival of the Leeds and Liverpool Canal in 1774, this brought the area into the modern world, originally providing a safe route through Lancashire from Liverpool to Wigan, and eventually in 1816 through to Leeds. The route became very busy primarily for goods and later for the transportation of passengers. The outcome of all this activity was to bring prosperous businessmen from the city to the countryside, where they had a desire to live. The canal was crossed by a mechanical lifting bridge built in 1934 (replacing an earlier swing bridge) which was demolished in 1974.

The area was the northern extremity of the Bootle and North Docks lines of Liverpool's tramway network. From the boundary with Bootle, it ran for ¾ of a mile along Linacre Road to a terminus at the junction with Bridge Road. This short stretch was the last horse drawn service in Liverpool, switching to electric operation in August 1903, eight months after the rest of the system converted.

The Litherland Gala was staged every year and was famous for the procession of shire horses and floats from the docks. The gala procession ended at the Bryant and May sports field.

Litherland Town Hall was officially opened in February 1941: The Beatles played some of their earliest gigs there in 1961.

== Governance ==
For parliamentary elections, Litherland is within the Bootle constituency. The town is currently represented by the Labour Party MP Peter Dowd.

Litherland returns six members to Sefton Council from two electoral wards, each with three representatives. As of May 2023, the Litherland ward is represented by Patricia Hardy, John Kelly, and Paul Tweed; and the Ford ward's representatives are Liz Dowd, Paulette Lappin and Ian Moncur. All six are members of the Labour Party.

== Education ==
Primary schools in the area include Beach Road primary school, Hatton Hill Primary School, English Martyrs' Catholic Primary School, Litherland Moss Primary School, Lander Road Primary School, Our Lady Queen of Peace Catholic Primary School, St Elizabeth's Catholic Primary School and St Philip's Church of England Controlled Primary School.

Litherland High School is the main secondary school in the area, while Rowan Park School is a special school for 2 to 19 year-olds.

South Sefton College is a sixth form which serves students in Litherland as well as the wider southern part of the Metropolitan Borough of Sefton.

== Media ==
Local news and television programmes are provided by BBC North West and ITV Granada, the local television station TalkLiverpool also broadcasts to the area. Television signals are received from the Winter Hill TV transmitter.

Local radio stations are BBC Radio Merseyside, Heart North West, Capital Liverpool, Hits Radio Liverpool, Smooth North West, and Greatest Hits Radio Liverpool & The North West.

The town is served by the local newspaper, Liverpool Echo.

== Transport ==
Litherland is served by Seaforth & Litherland railway station on the Hunts Cross to Southport line of the Merseyrail network. The main road is the A5036 road, which connects to Switch Island and the A565 road at Seaforth Dock.

== See also ==
- Listed buildings in Litherland
