= Netherton, Merseyside =

Coordinates: 53.4938°N 2.9677°W

Netherton
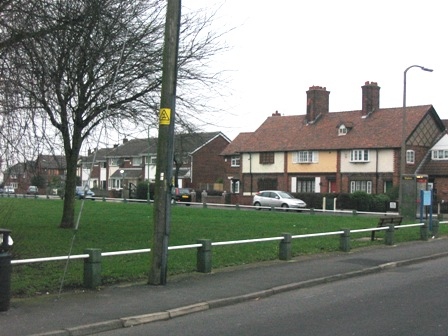
- Netherton Village

- Location within Merseyside
- OS grid reference: SJ352997
- Metropolitan borough: Sefton
- Metropolitan county: Merseyside
- Region: North West
- Country: England
- Sovereign state: United Kingdom
- Post town: BOOTLE
- Postcode district: L30
- Dialling code: 0151
- Police: Merseyside
- Fire: Merseyside
- Ambulance: North West
- UK Parliament: Bootle

Netherton is an area of the Metropolitan Borough of Sefton, in Merseyside, England.

== Description ==
Netherton is situated in the southern part of the Metropolitan Borough of Sefton, approximately 6 miles north of Liverpool City Centre. Netherton neighbours Thornton, Litherland, Aintree, Walton and Sefton Village.

Netherton is a mostly residential area, comprising the semi-rural Netherton Village, (which consists of privately owned houses set around the old Village Green) and the large council estate built by the former Bootle Borough Council on the other side of the Leeds and Liverpool Canal.

The estate is unusual in the fact that many of the houses are still occupied by the same residents who moved in as young couples with families when the houses were brand new. The social profile of the first resident population does not comply to modern notions of council estate dwellers. Many of these people were hard working people with middle class aspirations, whose lives and careers were interrupted and often changed forever by the Second World War. However, the demographics of the Netherton area have changed significantly over time. A large number of the male residents moved in from all parts of the country to be key skilled workers at the English Electric factory heavy engineering works on Dunnings Bridge Road.

The main estate, centred on Marian Square, was built in the mid 1950s to alleviate housing shortages in Bootle after the heavy bombing the town suffered during the Second World War. Historical records show that of about 18,000 houses in Bootle, only about 1,000 survived the German bombings completely intact. A remaining 16,000 houses were partially damaged and over a thousand completely destroyed.

The Sefton Estate (which includes Stonyfield, Waterside, Harrops Croft and Higher End Park) was built by Lancashire County Council some ten years after the Netherton estate in the mid 1960s and were the first council houses in the area to have central heating.

Marian Square is opposite the health centre in Magdalene Square (the two squares are divided by Glovers Lane, and should not be confused). The first shops (approximately five, including a health clinic and opticians) were built on Magdalene Square and were later demolished when the new shops and first new post office on Marian Square were opened. The original plans for the redevelopment for Magdalene Square, which were on view as a model in Bootle Town Hall in 1965, were for a 22 storey tower block and a leisure complex including swimming pool, neither of which were built (probably due to a lack of further investment in the area).

There were also plans for a large ring road to link the motorways at Switch Island, running across fields to the north of the Sefton estate with the centre of Bootle and the landward side of Crosby, along a corridor of land which included the Rimrose Valley. The council purchased land along this corridor but the road was never built. There is a large mound of earth next to the small church near the Cabbage Inn (near the present fire station); which shows the start of the earthworks for the flyover linking the proposed ring road to the goods depot on the railway line near the Girobank building on Netherton Way. The proposed ring road is shown on some old Liverpool A to Z street plans.

The unused land in the Rimrose Valley was made into an area of parkland, and new houses are being built on the old allotments at the other end of the Rimrose Valley in Litherland.

Notable firms which hold, or once held, premises in Netherton include:- Braby's; English Electric; Forticrete; Metal Box; Movie (cleaning products); National Girobank; Peerless Refining Co.; North West Timber; Porter Chadburn; Post Office Telecommunications (British Telecom.); Scott's Bakery (now part of Allied Bakeries) and now the site of a large trading estate including Odeon cinema, Matalan store, Dunelm mill furniture store and a pub called the Bakers Dozen; McDonald's restaurant with drive thru, Subway restaurant with drive thru and to a Ben Dunne gym.

Netherton was formerly the home of the Everton F.C. youth academy, which has now been relocated to Finch Farm. The land was previously a fire station (the old brick building on the site) and the grounds of Littlewoods Social Club. This area has now been turned into a Goals football centre.

On 19 August 2015 the Thornton to Switch Island link road (A5758) was opened.

== History ==
Before the Earl of Sefton relocated to Croxteth Hall in the late 18th century the family had a large estate in Netherton, with the main house and outbuildings located on the site of Our Lady of Walsingham school. The deer park is marked on numerous 17th and 18th century maps. and covered a large tract of land between what is now Bull Lane in Walton, Park Lane, Netherton Way, and Bootle Golf Course.

Netherton was anciently a township associated with the parish of Sefton, becoming an independent civil parish in 1866. It became part of Sefton Rural District under the Local Government Act 1894, and then West Lancashire Rural District in 1932.

Netherton parish lost areas to the county borough of Bootle in 1940, 1951 and 1968 (reducing the parish from 1,124 acres (5 km^{2}) in 1931 to 469 acres (1.9 km^{2}) in 1951). The residual parish no longer exists, forming part of Sefton parish.

The area has been a part of the Metropolitan Borough of Sefton since local government reorganisation on 1 April 1974.

For parliamentary elections Netherton is within the Bootle constituency represented by the Labour Party MP Peter Dowd.

For elections to Sefton Council Netherton is split between the electoral wards of Netherton and Orrell, whose three representatives are Susan Ellen Bradshaw, Robert John Brennan, and Ian Ralph Maher, and St. Oswald, whose three representatives are Paula Spencer, Carla Thomas and Linda Cluskey. All six councillors who represent the Netherton area are members of the Labour Party.

== Architecture ==
The oldest houses are to be found at the heart of the old hamlet of Netherton, clustered around the green in what is now known as Netherton Village, just north of the Leeds and Liverpool Canal. The old catholic church of St. Benet nearby was built in 1793. Unusually it appears as an ordinary house from the road with the church backing onto what was once open fields. A modern church was built over the road in the 1970s.

Nowadays, Netherton is formed with many modern housing, the most recent being the George Wimpey estate, completed in 2000, built just 100 yards (100 m) from Netherton Village green. Housing in this part of Netherton is considered rather desirable, unlike the council-owned housing closer to the town's shopping amenities.

== Education ==
Netherton is home to one secondary school, The Salesian Academy of St John Bosco. Formerly there was St Ambrose Barlow High School, Bootle Grammar School and Warwick Bolam County Secondary School as well as a Girl's County Secondary School. In August 2009, Bootle High School closed its doors for the last time as students transferred to Litherland High School. In December 2009, works started to demolish the school on Browns Lane. Now however the properties on the council estate are mostly privately owned and were bought under the right to buy scheme brought in by the conservative government under Margaret Thatcher. St Ambrose Barlow was formerly St. Catherine's Roman Catholic High School and was for girls only, also closed on 11 November 2016. The corresponding boys' school was St. Thomas Aquinas Roman Catholic High School, situated approximately on mile away on the other side of the canal.

== Transport ==
Netherton is served by two railway-stations: Aintree and Old Roan, on the Northern Line of the Merseyrail network. The Old Roan station is technically in Aintree, but is on the border between the two areas. Old Roan bus station is next to the railway-station. Buses run from here and Magdalene Square into central Liverpool (those from Magdalene Square also serve parts of Bootle) as well as North to Maghull, Ormskirk and Southport.

The area is situated close to the major interchange, Switch Island, at the end of the M57 and M58 motorways.

The Leeds and Liverpool Canal flows through Netherton and whilst this provides a local amenity, there is very little boat traffic on this stretch of its course.
