= Rimrose Valley =

Country park in Merseyside, UK

Coordinates: 53.473°N 3.010°W

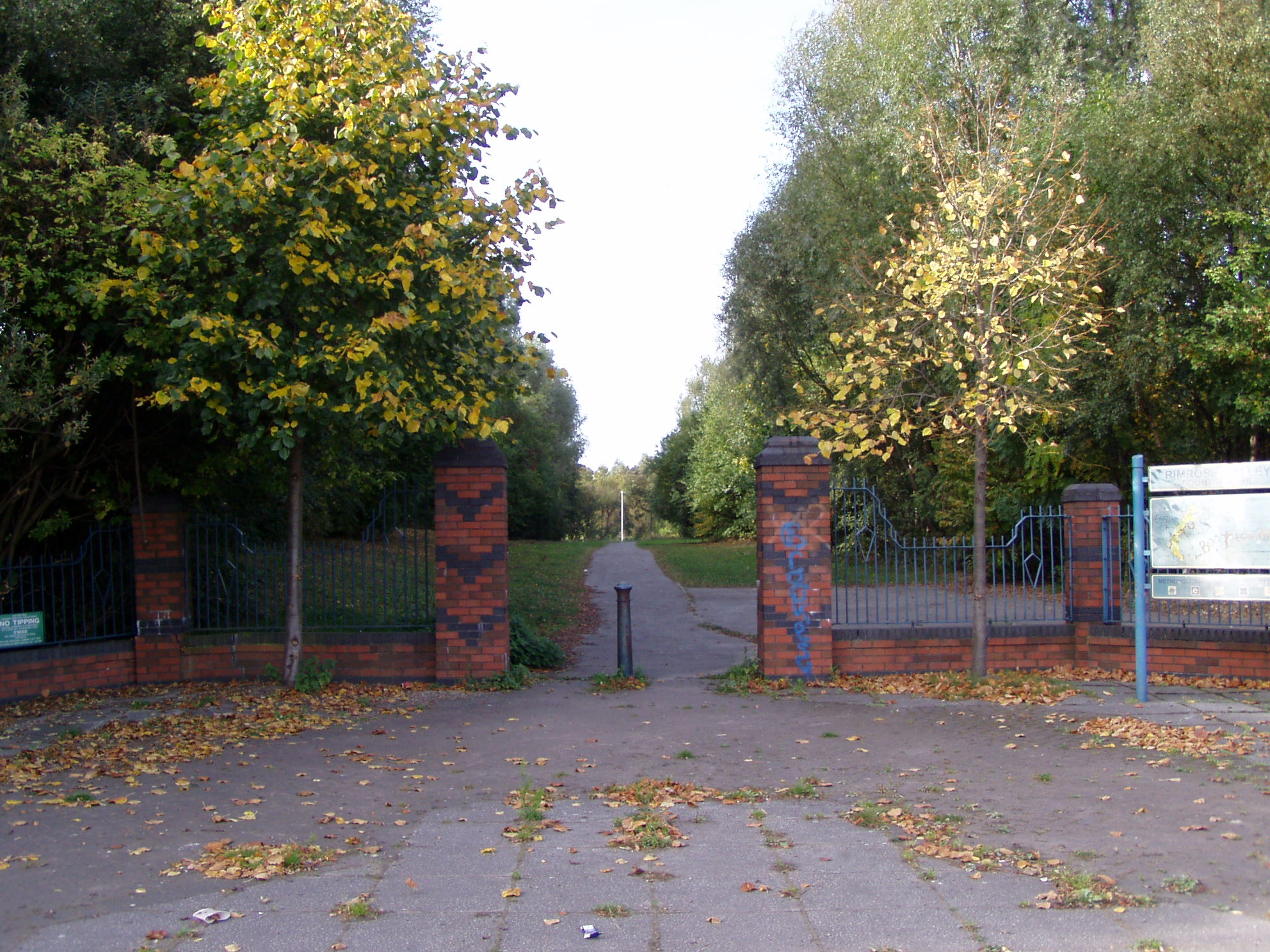
- Entrance to Park
- Interactive map of Rimrose Valley
- Location: Between Crosby and Litherland
- Nearest city: Liverpool
- Operator: Sefton Council
- Open: Open all year round

Rimrose Valley is a 3.5 km (2.2 mi) country park and valley which forms a border between Crosby and Litherland in the borough of Sefton, Merseyside, England, with the Leeds and Liverpool Canal on its eastern edge.

Because the brook that runs through the park regularly floods, it remained clear of the housing developments that grew up on either side. However, the central area was used as a tip until 1978 and restoration began in 1993. Rimrose is a Hybrid word from Old English hrim (modern "rim"), 'border' and Celtic ros meaning "moor" or "heath".

Following concern over young people riding scrambler bikes in the park, resulting in at least one serious accident, the police launched a crackdown in 2015. This led to the formation of Rimrose Valley Friends; a charity which works to promote, protect and enhance the park. The charity delivers activities and events which use the parkland to promote physical and mental health, community cohesion and projects which protect the natural environment.

== History ==
=== Formation ===
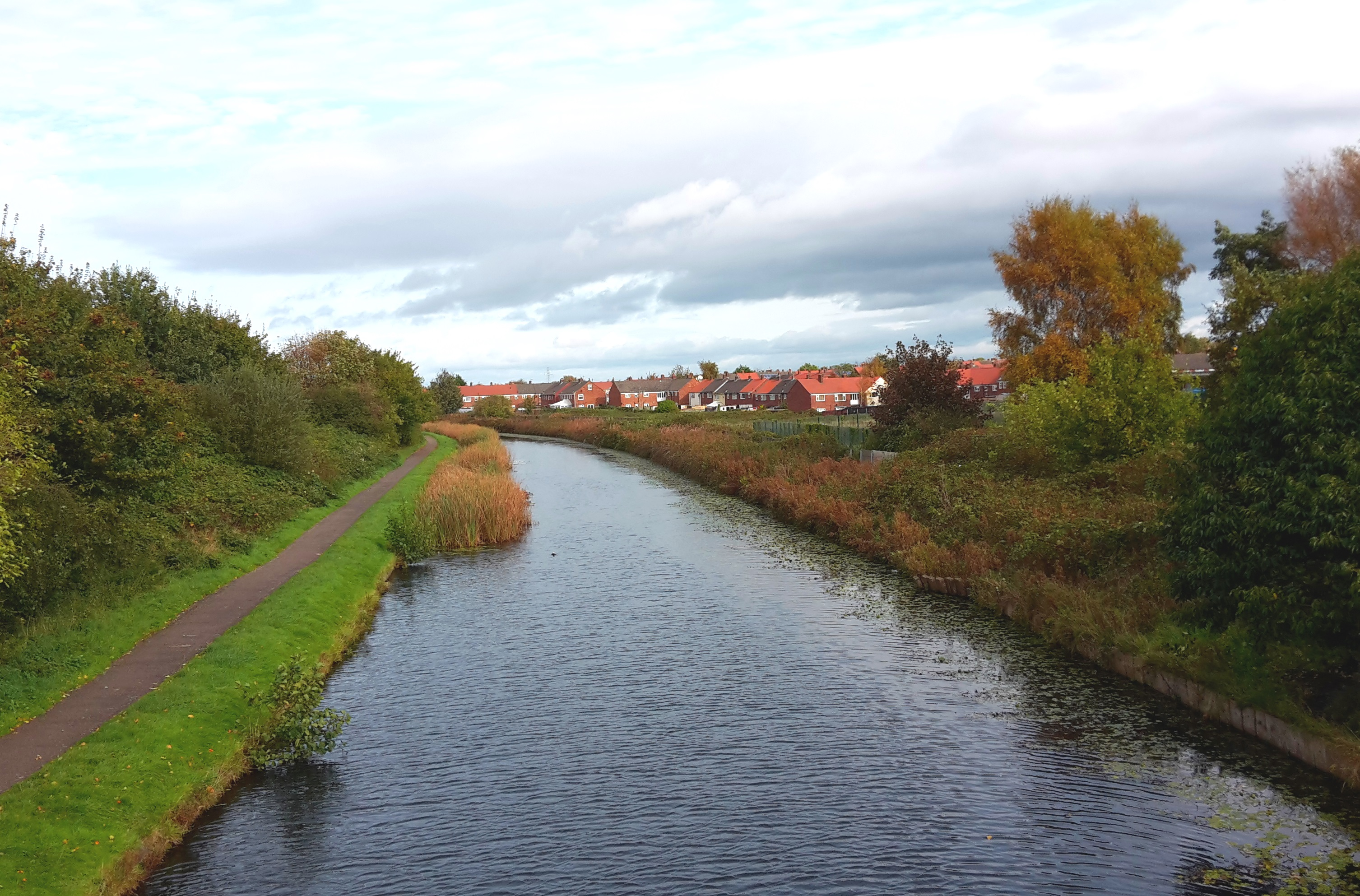
Leeds and Liverpool Canal in Rimrose Valley, October 2017

The formation of the valley in its current state can be dated back over the last 1.6 million years, during which time sand, peat and clay deposits have built up over parts of the valley, which itself has formed as a result of sandstone strata erosion. The outer edges of the valley were put to use as farmland, particularly on higher ground where flooding was less likely, though throughout the 20th century much of the farm land has been restricted to the northernmost regions of the valley.

=== 20th century ===
In January 1991, it was reported that the valley, then a wasteland and rubbish tip area, was part of a study which planned on developing the region into a country park and leisure area. Reports in October 1992 suggested that plans to turn the area into a premier leisure park were being prepared for consideration by councilors, which would involve landscaping to facilitate a variety of sports facilities. Up until 1978, the central area was used as a tip and restoration began in 1993.

== Geology ==
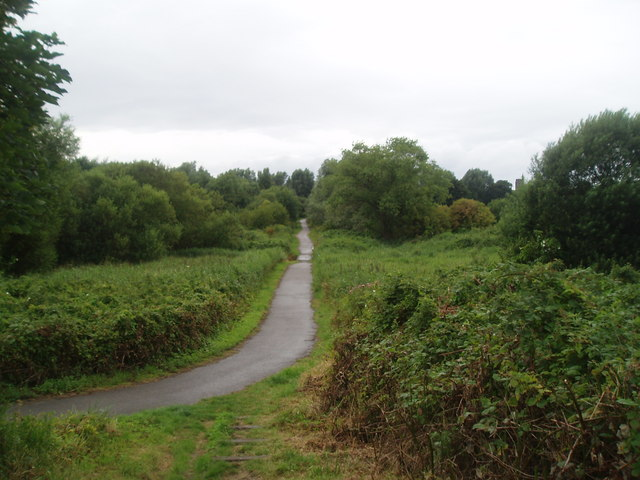
Rimrose Valley Nature Reserve, run and managed by the Sefton Ranger Service

Rimrose Valley is now part of the Mersey Forest and the most southerly extent of the West Lancashire Coastal Plain. The south of the valley contains the Brookvale Nature Reserve which is the only one in Sefton that is not on the coast and is, along with Fulwood Way in the north, a Site of Special Local Biological Interest.

== Layout ==
Because of the size of the park, the area has been divided into five colour-coded zones that allow people to narrow down their location if they need to contact the emergency services. The north–south walking distance is approximately 6 km (3.7 mi), with a grade of moderate and an estimated walking time of 90 minutes.

== Highway proposals ==
Early considerations for a road through the valley were in 1990, when it was reported that plans were being drawn up for a dual carriageway through the valley, despite having previously been earmarked for wildlife. In March 1993, the Liverpool Echo reported that residents were suggesting a road be built with restrictions on commercial vehicles and the council were understood to be considering it. In January 1994, it was reported that a 70 mph dual carriageway through the valley to ease traffic was a favoured option, which was anticipated to connect with another road that had been planned, the 'Blue Route'. Then-highways chief for Sefton, Geoff Cowie, believed a road would give good value for money and hoped for a quick decision.

In 2013, under the leadership of Peter Dowd, Sefton Council placed members of council, as well as its chief executive, to the Port Access Steering Group to work with Highways England and Peel Ports (as well as other agencies) to establish "a permanent highways solution" due to the expansion of the port. Sefton Council was chairing the Port Access Steering Group on behalf of the Liverpool City Region (LCR). From this, in the same year, Sefton Council commissioned the Atkins Group to conduct a feasibility study for the road solution. The report/study was completed in February 2014.

In November 2014, Atkins made a presentation to the LCR Port Access Steering Group, three of whom (including the chair) were from Sefton Council. In their presentation, Atkins summarised the latest thinking in relation to the Online Option and the Offline Option, as well as considering tunnel options which were deemed to be "cost-prohibitive". The Online and Offline options would later be referred to as Option A and Option B in Highways England's public consultation of 2017.

Following the presentation, the Steering Group gave Highways England the task of deciding on Option A or B. The announcement came two years after the completion of the feasibility study in February 2014.

In 2003 a similar study had been conducted, commissioned by Sefton Council, and the preferred option then was Rimrose Valley.

Plans were announced in February 2016 which proposed a new £200m road could be built through Rimrose Valley to link directly into the A5758 Broom's Cross Road in an effort to reduce the heavy congestion on the A5036 Dunnings Bridge Road; Sefton Council rejected the proposal in March 2017, citing the desire to instead build a tunnel to overcome the congestion concerns. Despite Sefton Council's stance and the public consultation revealing that the option selected by Highways England received less support from the public, Option B - a dual carriageway through Rimrose Valley - was announced in August 2017. In December 2017, Highways England attempted to defend their position that a bypass road is the preferred option to provide a direct link between the Port of Liverpool and Switch Island junction, citing considerable cost and disruption if a tunnel, estimated to cost six times as much, were to be constructed.

In 2018, Sefton Council brought a judicial review against Highways England on the basis that it felt a tunnel should have been presented as an option. The High Court ruled in favour of Highways England, but the legal action resulted in a considerable delay to the project. In August 2019, Highways England were forced to publicly apologise for claiming that, in this judicial review, a judge had upheld its preferred route for a road through Rimrose Valley. This was inaccurate: the judge had simply ruled that it was not legally required to consult on a tunnel option.

== Save Rimrose Valley Campaign ==
A local campaign group, named "Save Rimrose Valley", was formed in 2017 by the charity Rimrose Valley Friends to oppose Highways England's plans and to demand that sustainable, non-road solutions to the movement of freight to and from the Port of Liverpool be researched and presented to the public.

The campaign quickly attracted a large and active following. They appeared on Jeremy Vine's BBC Radio 2 show in 2018 to debate the scheme with Highways England's Regional Delivery Director, Tim Gamon. It staged a large demonstration on the park in September 2018 called "Hands Across the Valley" which was attended by more than 700 people and was covered by BBC North West Tonight and Granada Reports. The event was attended by local MPs Bill Esterson and Peter Dowd, as well as Friends of the Earth and Chris Todd from Campaign for Better Transport (United Kingdom). Members of the public formed a giant heart on the parkland and linked arms along its central path.

In March 2019, the campaign secured the support of Friends of the Earth's CEO, Craig Bennett. He visited the country park, spoke with local schoolchildren and members of the public and called for Highways England to scrap the scheme.

In September 2020, Highways England announced that the project was delayed due to the COVID-19 pandemic and would not be completed until at least 2025.

As COVID restrictions were eased, in August 2021, the Save Rimrose Valley campaign held another large demonstration, with several hundred people marching from Rimrose Valley to the gates of the Port of Liverpool, to highlight its role in the road proposal. Guest speakers included MPs Peter Dowd, Bill Esterson as well as Chris Todd, now from Transport Action Network. Also present were Crispin Truman, then CEO of CPRE and Estelle Worthington, representing Friends of the Earth.

In September 2022, campaigners marched through Manchester city centre to National Highways regional offices in Piccadilly to deliver messages of protest and artwork prepared by school children in South Sefton, calling on Regional Delivery Director, Stewart Jones, to re-think the scheme.

In August 2023, campaigners marched 6 miles from Rimrose Valley to the head offices of the Liverpool City Region to highlight its opposition to the road and to call for the Metro Mayor, Steve Rotheram, to help secure better solutions. In doing so, they secured the backing of the Combined Authority's Transport Committee Chair, Cllr Steve Foulkes.

In 2023, the project was further delayed due to "environmental challenges and ongoing design changes".

In November 2023, the campaign re-recorded Parklife by indie band Blur (band) changing the words and creating a video to highlight the campaign to save the park.

In May 2024, the campaign projected images onto landmarks across Liverpool city centre to highlight opposition to the road.

In July 2024, the campaign hosted Liverpool's first ever The Most Wuthering Heights Day Ever to highlight Rimrose Valley Country Park and its campaign to save it. The event attracted more than 150 people dressed as Kate Bush to recreate the famous dance.

In October 2024, the road proposal was cancelled as part of Rachel Reeves' budget announcements and cited as being "unfunded and unaffordable".

As of May 2026, Rimrose Valley Friends is now focusing on its core work, delivering projects which support the environment and local communities' health and wellbeing.
