= Sefton Rural District =

Former local government area in the UK

Coordinates: 53.489°N 3.028°W

Sefton was a rural district in Lancashire, England from 1894 to 1932.

It was created by the Local Government Act 1894 based on West Derby rural sanitary district. It included the following parishes:

- Aintree
- Croxteth Park (to Liverpool in 1928)
- Fazakerley (to Liverpool in 1905)
- Orrell and Ford (split 1905 to Orrell which became part of Bootle, and Ford, which remained in Sefton RD)
- Ince Blundell
- Kirkby (transferred to Whiston Rural District in 1922)
- Lunt
- Netherton
- Sefton
- Thornton
- West Derby Rural (to Liverpool in 1928)

It was abolished by a County Review Order in 1932, with the parishes being added to the West Lancashire Rural District (Lunt being abolished and added to Sefton parish at the same time). The remaining parishes, Aintree, Ford (itself absorbed into Litherland Urban District in 1954), Ince Blundell, Netherton, Sefton and Thornton, have all formed part of the Metropolitan Borough of Sefton in Merseyside since 1974.
