= M57 motorway =

Motorway encircling Liverpool, England

M57

- M57 highlighted in blue Shown with North West England motorway network

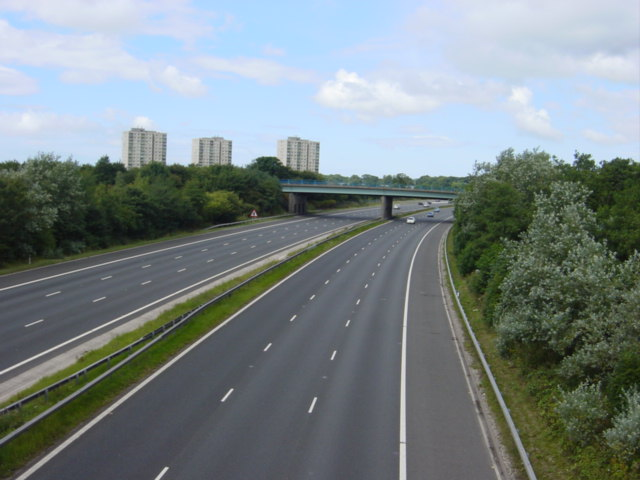
- Looking northwards near Stockbridge Village, 2005

Route information
- Maintained by National Highways
- Length: 10 mi (16 km)
- Existed: 1972–present
- History: Constructed 1972–1974

Major junctions
- Southeast end: Huyton
- J1 M62 / A5300; J5 A580; J7 M58 / A59 / A5036
- Northwest end: Switch Island; Aintree

Location
- Country: United Kingdom
- Primary destinations: Liverpool

Road network
- Roads in the United Kingdom; Motorways; A and B road zones
| ← M56 | → M58 |

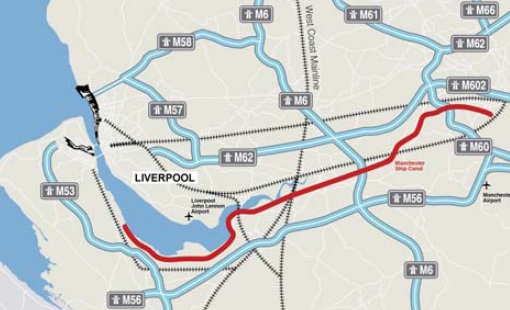
Motorways of Liverpool City Region

The M57 motorway, also known as the Liverpool Outer Ring Road, is a motorway in England. Designed as a ring road for Liverpool, it is 10 miles (16 km) long between Tarbock Green and Switch lsland, and links various towns east of the city, as well as the M62 and M58 motorways.

== Route ==
Starting at the Tarbock Interchange in Tarbock, at the end of the A5300, the motorway heads north to the east of Huyton and west of Prescot and crosses the Liverpool and Manchester Railway. It then runs across the northeast of Huyton before running west of Knowsley Village. After meeting the A580 at a split junction (numbered 4 & 5), it continues northwest through Kirkby, passes under the Kirkby and Ormskirk branches of the Merseyrail Northern Line before ending on Switch Island near Aintree. The motorway provides one of the main access routes to Aintree Racecourse.

== History ==
The M57 was planned to be a complete bypass of Liverpool, meeting some of the key routes out of the city. As is normal in the United Kingdom, the M57 was to be built in stages. The first two opened were:

- Junctions 4 to 7 were opened in 1972 as phase 1.
- Junctions 1 to 4 were opened in 1974 as phase 2.

Phase 1 was approved by Lancashire County Council's highways and bridges committee in April 1969, estimating to cost around £3.9 million with construction work anticipated to start several months later. By the end of 1969, work had not yet commenced, although the Minister of Transport Fred Mulley announced in December 1969 that a grant of around £2.9 million had been made to Lancashire County Council towards the road's cost. Following conclusion of an invitation to tender process in January 1970, construction work was expected to start around March 1970. The road was planned with dual 24 foot (7.3 m) wide carriageways and a wide central reservation which allowed for future carriageway widening. The scheme was proceeded with more rapidly as there had been industrial growth in the area, and it was considered important to improve traffic connections as soon as possible. The original plans for the route anticipated an extension south to the A562.

The road opened to traffic in April 1972, three months ahead of schedule. Shortly before opening, the second phase was announced by the council as being close to starting construction, with an estimated cost of £11.5 million.

At Switch Island, the junction was constructed to allow an extension of the M57 towards the A565 near Thornton and the end of the M58 has provision for slip roads to that extension to be constructed. Contemporary maps also showed a proposed southern extension, eventually constructed in the 1990s as the A5300. A new road was opened in August 2015 to join the A565 at Thornton to Switch Island junction at the M57 and M58 motorways respectively; the road was appropriately named the A5758 road.

At the southern end of the M57 where it meets the M62 (Tarbock Island) and also the A5300 southern extension, a £38 million improvement scheme to create a free-flow link with the M62 eastbound was completed on 14 November 2008. At the same junction a free-flow link from the M62 Westbound to the M57 northbound was completed on 12 December.

== Junctions ==
M57 motorway juntions
| Ceremonial county | Location | mi | km | Junction | Destinations | Notes |
|---|---|---|---|---|---|---|
| Merseyside | Huyton | 0 | 0 | 1 (Note: 53.3982°N 2.8084°W) | M62 – Huyton, Liverpool (city centre), Manchester, Warrington, Widnes A5300 – Liverpool(south), Runcorn A5080 – Cronton, Huyton, Whiston | Road continues south as A5300 |
| Merseyside | Huyton | 2.6 | 4.2 | 2 (Note: 53.4279°N 2.8213°W) | A57 – Liverpool, Prescot, Whiston A58 – St. Helens; B5194 - Knowsley village | |
| Merseyside | Knowsley | 4.3 | 6.9 | 3 (Note: 53.4365°N 2.8553°W) | A526 – Liverpool, Prescot, Huyton B5194 - Knowsley village | No north-eastbound exit or south-eastbound entrance |
| Merseyside | Knowsley | 6.2 | 10.0 | 4 (Note: 53.4612°N 2.8779°W) | A580 – Liverpool, Bootle, St. Helens, Kirkby A5207 – Kirkby | |
| Merseyside | Knowsley | 6.5 | 10.5 | 5 (Note: 53.4639°N 2.8834°W) | A580 – St. Helens | No north-eastbound exit or south-eastbound entrance |
| Merseyside | Kirkby | 7.5 | 12.1 | 6 (Note: 53.4734°N 2.9013°W) | A506 – Liverpool, Walton, Fazakerley, Kirkby | |
| Merseyside | Kirkby | 10.0 | 16.1 | 7 (Note: 53.4928°N 2.9531°W) | M58 – Skelmersdale, Preston A59 – Southport, Ormskirk A5036 – Bootle A5758 – Southport, Formby | |
1.000 mi = 1.609 km; 1.000 km = 0.621 mi: Concurrency terminus; Incomplete access

Coordinate list

== See also ==
- List of motorways in the United Kingdom
