= A5300 road =

Road in England

Coordinates: 53.38402°N 2.7998°W

A5300

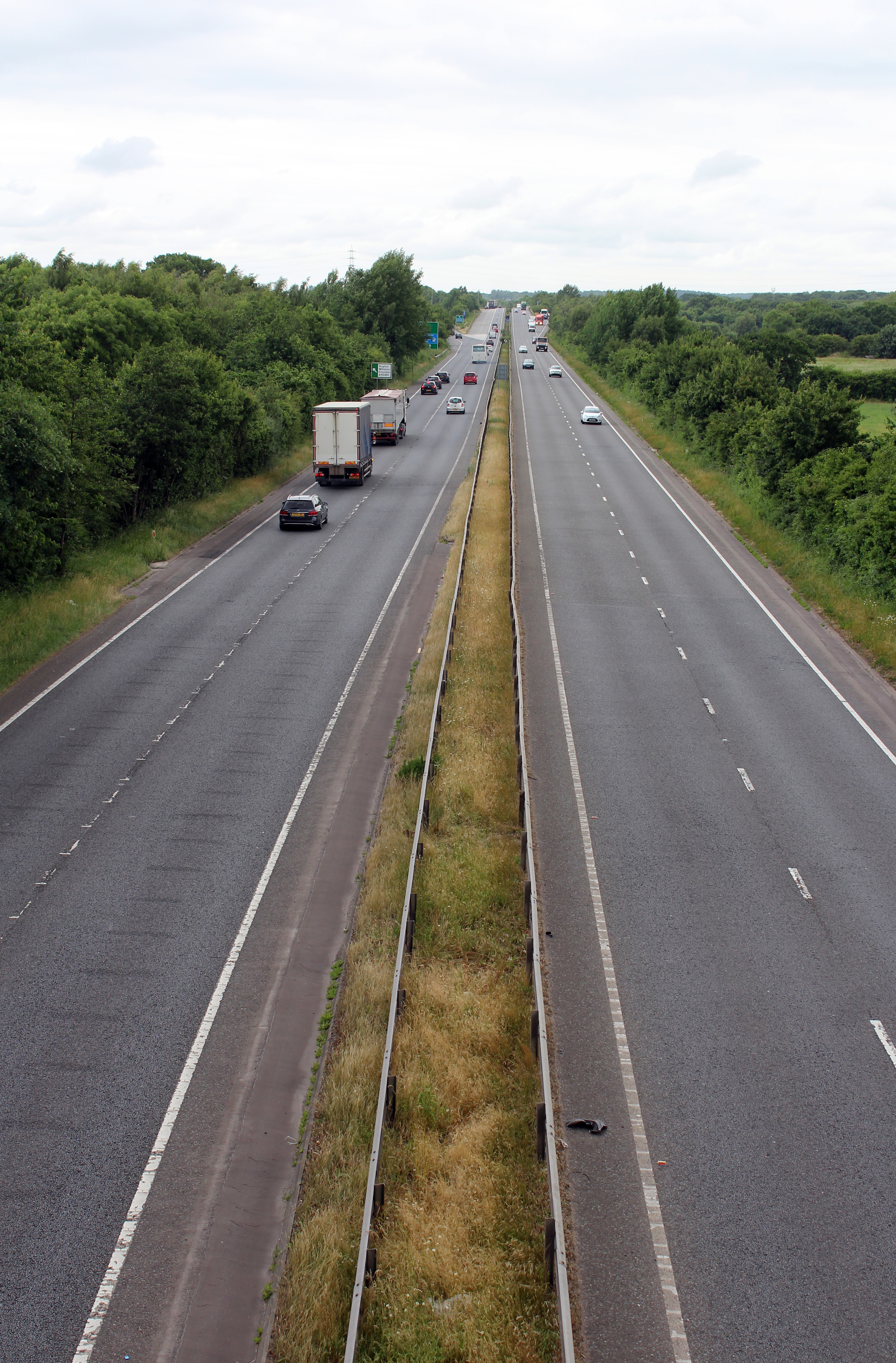
- View towards Tarbock Island from Water Lane

Route information
- Length: 3 mi (4.8 km)
- Existed: 1996–present

Major junctions
- From: A562

- To: M62

Location
- Country: United Kingdom

Road network
- Roads in the United Kingdom; Motorways; A and B road zones

The A5300 or Knowsley Expressway is a major road in Merseyside, England. It runs 3 miles (4.8 km) from its junction with the A562 to its junction with the M62, where it becomes the M57, providing a major north–south route through the borough. Along its course it crosses the Liverpool to Manchester Line Southern route. The road cost £47.3 million (equivalent to £114,933,825 in 2023) when it was constructed during 1995–1996.

== History ==
The idea of the extension dates back to the early 1970s, when Lancashire County Council was responsible for the region. When Knowsley Metropolitan Borough came into existence around 1986, they prioritised the need for construction of the route and in 1988, appointed consultants to examine the feasibility. Following traffic surveys, it was confirmed that a dual carriageway link road was needed. In total, nine alternate routes were assessed for consideration but many were rejected on environmental grounds. In 1989, Knowsley approached the Department for Transport regarding funding for their preferred route and arranged a 50% grant towards the cost. A public inquiry was needed due to 48 pieces of land needed from private owners to build the road on. Balfour Beatty were confirmed as the chosen constructor in the summer of 1993.

Initial groundwork commenced in September 1993 and during early construction, ancient roof tiles dating back to 167 AD were unearthed alongside the path of the new road.

The Expressway was constructed during 1995–1996, during which time over 24 hectares (59 acres) of woodland was planted along the embankments. The road took around two and a half years to construct, which involved re-routing streams and planting around half a million trees. The road was opened on 15 April 1996 by Eddie O'Hara MP and the first cars travelled along the road from 2pm the same day. It was estimated that the road would take around 35,000 vehicles each day.

During development, Knowsley schools ran a competition for their school pupils to name the new road. The competition was won by a Halsnead Community Primary School pupil who named it the Knowsley Expressway. As with other projects, the A5300 is a downgraded extension of a motorway, in this case the M57.

== Improvements ==
In 2016, Knowsley Council announced a £5.3m investment to improve the expressway's southern junction with Speke Road, to focus on reducing congestion during peak time and ensure future demand can be met by expected economic growth.
