= A59 road =

Road in Northern England

A59

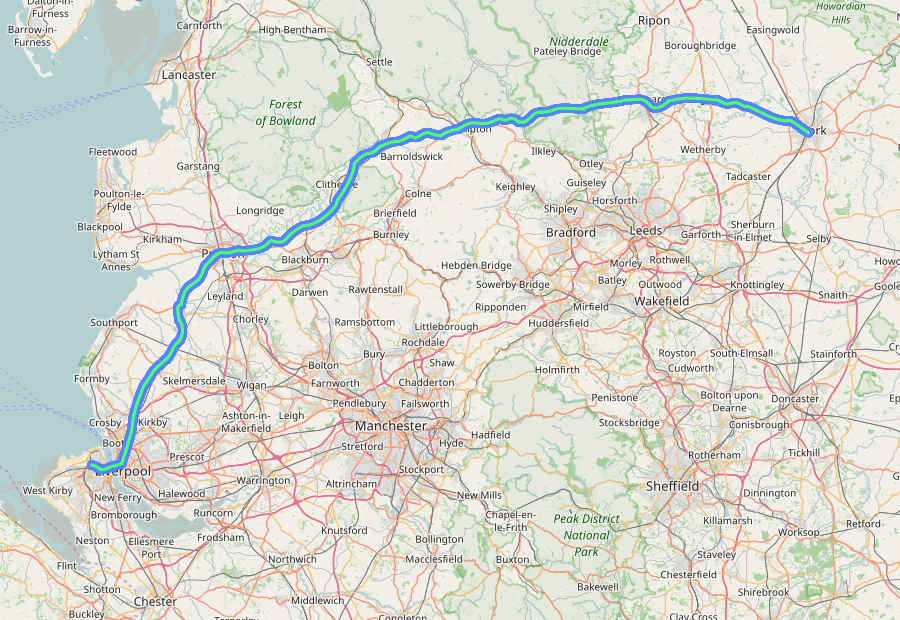
- Route of the A59 road across Northern England

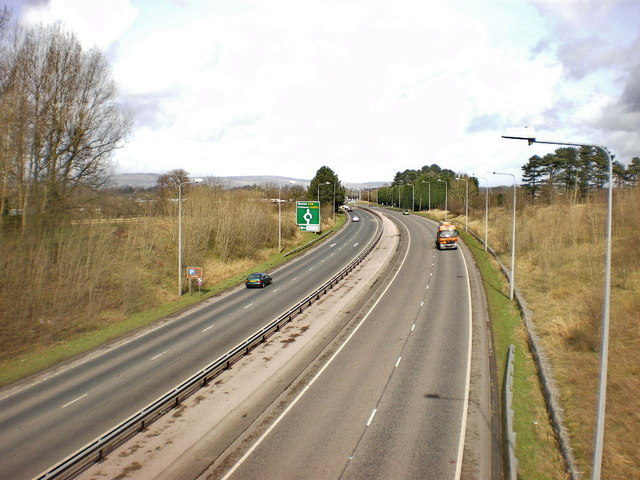
- A dual-carriageway stretch of A59 near Clitheroe

Route information
- Maintained by Lancashire County Council; Liverpool City Council; North Yorkshire Council; Sefton Metropolitan Borough Council; York City Council
- Length: 110.2 mi (177.3 km)
- History: 1936 (designated the A59)

Major junctions
- West end: M53 in Wallasey; 53.40951°N 2.98276°W

- M57 in Sefton; M58 in Sefton; A6 in Preston; M6 near Preston; A56 in Broughton; A65 near Skipton; A61 in Harrogate; A1(M) in Hopperton

- East end: A1036 in York; 53.9541°N 1.0938°W

Location
- Country: United Kingdom
- Counties: Merseyside; Lancashire; North Yorkshire
- Primary destinations: Liverpool; Preston; Clitheroe; Skipton; Harrogate; York

Road network
- Roads in the United Kingdom; Motorways; A and B road zones
← A58	→ A60

The A59 is a major road in England which is around 109 miles (175 km) long and runs from Wallasey, Merseyside to York, North Yorkshire. The alignment formed part of the Trunk Roads Act 1936, being then designated as the A59. It is a key route connecting Merseyside at the M53 motorway to Yorkshire, passing through three counties and connecting to various major motorways. The road is a combination of historical routes combined with contemporary roads and a mixture of dual and single carriageway. Some sections of the A59 in Yorkshire closely follow the routes of Roman roads, some dating back to the Middle Ages as salt roads, whilst much of the A59 in Merseyside follows Victorian routes which are largely unchanged to the present day.

Numerous bypasses have been constructed throughout the 20th century, one of the earliest being the Maghull bypass in the early 1930s, particularly where traffic through towns was congested. Portions of the route through Lancashire were proposed to be upgraded to motorway standard during the mid-20th century, latterly being downgraded to significant improvements then ultimately withdrawn from consideration. Sections of the road have previously been noted as being amongst the most dangerous in the country, particularly in Yorkshire, despite continued efforts to improve road safety.

== Route ==
=== Merseyside ===
The A59 starts in Wallasey at the northern end of the M53 motorway and heading through the Kingsway Tunnel. In the centre of Liverpool, a separate 0.7 miles (1.1 km) spur heads north from the roundabout junction at the entrance of the Queensway Tunnel, joining the main route at Scotland Road in Vauxhall. It continues north through Kirkdale and Walton, passing Aintree Racecourse and Ormskirk Road (forming the boundary between Aintree and Netherton), before reaching Switch Island junction where it meets the A5036, M57 motorway and the M58 motorway. From Switch Island, the A59 travels through Maghull and Lydiate, into Lancashire through Aughton and thence to Ormskirk, roughly parallel to the Merseyrail Northern Line path.

=== Lancashire ===
At Ormskirk, it reverts from a dual to single carriageway on an old bypass. The road follows through Burscough and Rufford, despite a bypass being considered for this section in the early 1980s, before reaching the A565 at Tarleton. The road continues over the Leeds and Liverpool Canal and River Douglas through to Longton (and Hutton) bypass, where it returns to dual carriageway. Passing Lancashire Police HQ, the road bypasses Penwortham and continues across the River Ribble into Preston, by-passing the city centre via Ring Way, where the A583 from Blackpool converges. It briefly merges with the A6 before heading East and meeting the M6 at junction 31, after which the road splits into two separate carriageways until it meets the A677 for Blackburn.

The A59 continues through Myerscough Smithy then runs around the perimeter of Samlesbury Aerodrome (a British Aerospace installation). At Longsight Road, it passes through Salesbury until meeting A666, at which point it bypasses Billington, Whalley then Clitheroe, Chatburn and the village of Sawley before reaching Gisburn.

=== Yorkshire ===
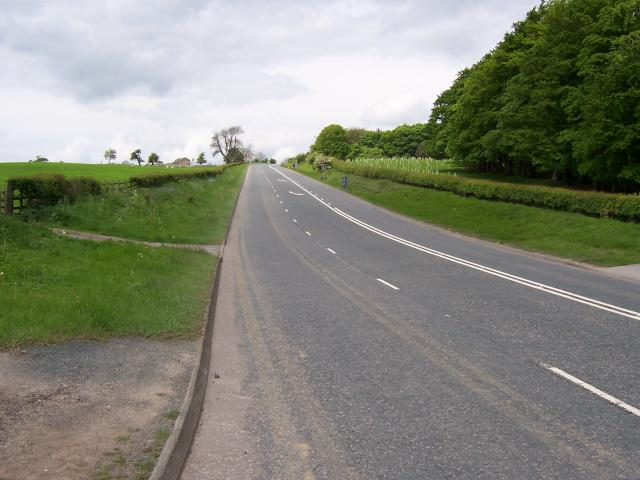
The Long Causeway

From Horton it enters North Yorkshire and goes through West and East Marton before meeting the A56, after which the road passes Broughton. Past Broughton, the road meets the Skipton bypass at its western end, where it overlaps the A65 on its route between Kendal and Leeds, de-merging with the A65 further to the east. The road continues over the Embsay and Bolton Abbey Steam Railway through a roundabout junction with the B6160 before rising up Beamsley hill. At the top of the hill, the road crosses into the Harrogate district, at which points there is a long narrow, twisting descent, known as Kex Gill, that leads to Blubberhouses village.

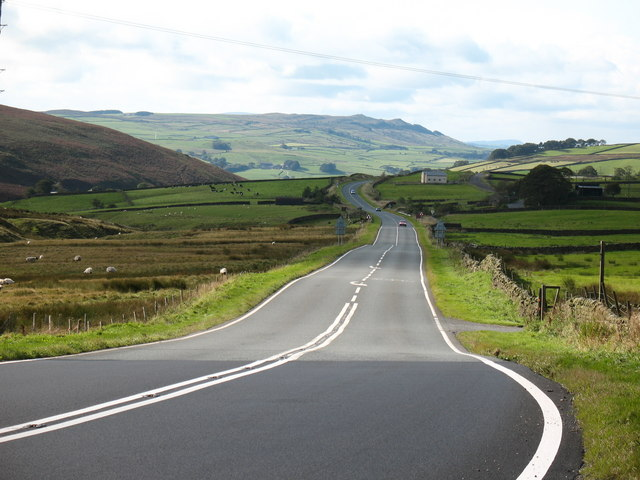
A stretch of A59 between Skipton and Harrogate

The A59 then runs along the head of Fewston Reservoir and follows the route of a Roman road past the 'golf balls' at Menwith Hill, an RAF station. As Skipton Road, the A59 then declines towards Harrogate passing Kettlesing. Reaching Harrogate as Skipton Road, it meets the A61 Ripon Road for Ripon, Harrogate town centre and Leeds, before continuing through the suburbs of the town as Skipton Road. This section of the A59 is widely considered to be one of the busiest roads in North Yorkshire. Part of this section travels across the Stray, an act-protected tract of grassy land which horseshoes around the town centre. The A59 then turns left at the Empress Roundabout, which is itself on the Stray, towards the suburb of Starbeck, although traffic travelling towards York is directed onto the A661 Wetherby Road to utilise the A658 Harrogate and Knaresborough Southern Bypass. The A59, however, continues to travel through Starbeck as Knaresborough Road and later High Street, then heads east to Knaresborough, passing through the town centre before heading towards York as York Road.

The remainder of the route is comparatively flat. From Knaresborough, the A59 meets up with York-directed traffic from Harrogate on the A658, and skirts to the north of Goldsborough towards the A1(M). The A59 heads towards York, travelling close to such places as Nun Monkton, Moor Monkton and Upper Poppleton before crossing Holgate Bridge and finally ending just to the south of the city walls at a zebra crossing at the junction of Bishopthorpe Road and Nunnery Lane, the A1036.

== History ==
=== Early history ===
The A59 in Yorkshire from Green Hammerton to York follows the path of an old Roman road known locally as Watling Street and may in Medieval times have been used as a salt road. Archaeological digging in 2008 showed the Roman road crossing the River Nidd on an old county bridge prior to diverging north-east of Green Hammerton, contrary to previous understanding of the route. Evidence of ditches earlier than the Roman conquest of Britain were also uncovered during the archaeological dig in 2008, suggesting a road network present in the area dating back to the Iron Age.

=== 19th century ===
Much of the present-day Merseyside alignment is unchanged over the last century, with the route through Liverpool to Switch Island junction in Aintree utilising existing road infrastructure from the Victorian era, such as Scotland Road. The present day alignment between Switch Island junction and Aughton, Lancashire via Maghull was non-existent prior to the 20th century, with the connecting roads being typically smaller lanes which still exist today. The A59's Ormskirk junction with the B5195 Turnpike Road is where the A59's continues along its Victorian alignment, known as Hollborn Hill before continuing through Ormskirk and West Lancashire. In Clitheroe district prior to the opening of the new Chatburn road in 1827 the main Liverpool / Skipton route ran through Clitheroe town via Whalley road and Pimlico over the limestone ridge of Chatburn Old road. The original route in Sawley village skirted the River Ribble from Smithies bridge and may have used the relatively steep & narrow brow from near the Spread Eagle pub, alongside the River Ribble, prior to today's route the A59 ran up from Southport House.

=== 20th century ===
The route from Liverpool to Leeds via Preston was one of many roads across the country to be designated a trunk road in the Trunk Roads Act 1936, being given the designation A59 and encompassing the alignment from Liverpool to Skipton. The route fell within the first schedule of the act, which also included around 4,460 miles (7,180 km) of road to be trunked and designated.

This century saw the vast majority of the A59's bypasses constructed, some of which were built before trunking, including a bypass of Ormskirk town centre in Lancashire, which appeared on maps from 1929 onwards as "Byepass Road" and subsequently forming the A59. Numerous additional bypasses were built after the road was trunked, to realign the A59 away from routes where it may have previously travelled through busy towns and cities. One of the earliest examples is in Lancashire with the Longton Bypass, which was constructed during 1956–57 at an estimated cost of £491,000 (equivalent to £10,640,000 in 2025). Prior to the bypass, the A59 travelled through the villages of Walmer Bridge, Longton and Hutton before being realigned to their east.

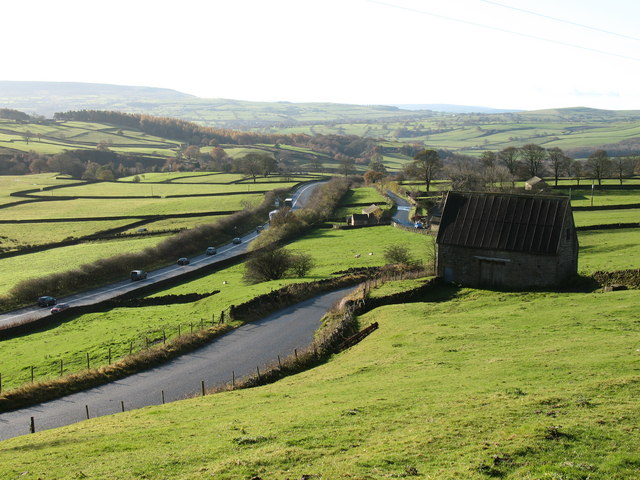
Old and new courses of the A59 at Hazlewood

In Yorkshire at Beamsley Hill, there are two lanes east-bound (on an incline) and a single lane west-bound, some of which was improved at various points during the late 20th century, such as in Hazlewood, where the A59 was rerouted to become a largely straight road, bypassing the now older winding route which exists to its north-west. The A59 was also rerouted just to the east of the Embsay and Bolton Abbey Steam Railway during the same period, requiring construction of a new Bolton Bridge over the River Wharfe, with the former alignment now forming a bridleway.

Up until the early 1970s, the start of the A59 was in the centre of Liverpool; this now forms a small spur connecting to the present day A59, which runs through the Kingsway Tunnel from its start point in Wallasey. The Birkenhead alignment of the A59 utilises a disused railway cutting to link the road up to the M53 motorway. In Lancashire, the A59 was realigned during the same period in the early 1970s, to bypass the towns of Clitheroe / Whalley plus the villages of Chatburn & Sawley. The Chatburn section includes a deep limestone cutting with the Downham road bridge overhead. Most of it was constructed as a single-carriageway despite parliamentary concerns that it would be less safe than a dual-carriageway. The Sawley brow section was 3 lanes with overtaking both ways, but following several serious accidents, is now only overtaking allowed on the uphill east-bound side. The bypass had been confirmed the year before at an estimated cost of £3.4 million (equivalent to £49,402,078 in 2025).

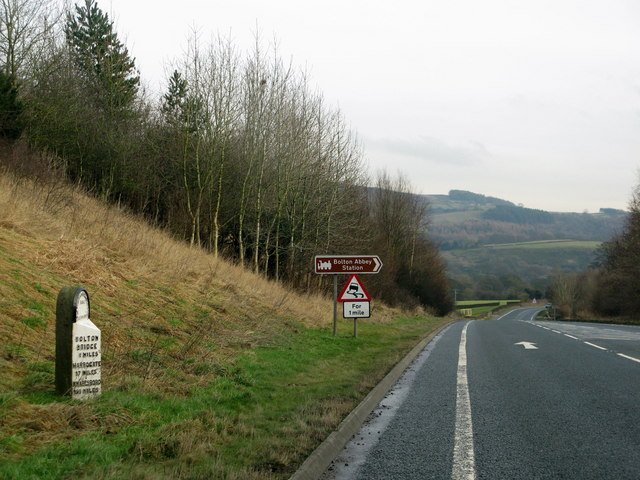
The A59 (new alignment) near Bolton Bridge, approx 3 miles east of Skipton

The A59 stretch of the Skipton Bypass was opened in 1981 at an estimated cost of £16.4 million (equivalent to £63,223,564 in 2025), crossing the B6265 north of the town and providing relief to traffic congestion. The A59 was upgraded to primary status during the 1990s due to its increased perceived importance as an east–west route. This stretch of the route was claimed in 2004 to be one of the busiest roads in North Yorkshire.

Whilst now skirting to the north of Goldsborough towards the A1(M), originally the route went through the village of Flaxby and onto Allerton, but the route now travels a restricted east–west route and meets the A1(M) at its junction 47. The road originally ended to the south of Green Hammerton, with the A66 routed down from Boroughbridge and going into York.

== Bypass improvements ==
The A59 in Yorkshire was part of North Yorkshire's 30-year transport plan in 2016, including maintenance of potholes and resurfacing works, as well as the potential construction of new routes.

Numerous sections of the route have been realigned at various stages, particularly where the previous alignment had travelled through busy villages or towns. Most have been constructed since the route was trunked and designated the A59, however some parts, such as the Maghull bypass, had been constructed prior to the Trunk Roads Act 1936.

=== List of A59 bypasses ===
Section	Start	End	Constructed	Type	Length
Maghull Bypass	Maghull	Lydiate	1932–1933	Dual-carriageway	4 miles (6.4 km)
Longton Bypass	Walmer Bridge	Hutton	1956–1957	Dual-carriageway	2.6 miles (4.2 km)
Clitheroe-Whalley Bypass	Billington	Chatburn	1969–1970	Single-carriageway	8.3 miles (13.4 km)
Skipton Bypass	Broughton	Skipton	1979–1981	Single-carriageway	3 miles (4.8 km)
Ormskirk Bypass	Bickerstaffe	Bretherton	Proposed 1982	Not constructed	
Burscough Bypass	Burscough		Proposed 1982	Not constructed	
Green Hammerton Bypass	Green Hammerton		1988–1989	Single-carriageway	1.3 miles (2.1 km)
Mellor Brook Bypass	Mellor Brook		1991–1992	Single-carriageway	0.8 miles (1.3 km)
Penwortham Bypass	Preston	Howick Cross	c.1984–2019	Dual-carriageway	3.3 miles (5.3 km)

=== Kex Gill Bypass ===
As of May 2026, a bypass is under construction for the Kex Gill section of road that spans from Blubberhouses to the top of Beamsley Hill. The road has been closed on many occasions since 2010 (particularly in 2016 when it was closed for 8 weeks for emergency repair work). It was closed again due to a landslip in May 2018 and local planners have stated that a new section of road should be built to the north of the current route on the other side of a very small and narrow valley. North Yorkshire County Council have stated that they will start to construct the £30 million bypass in spring 2020. This was delayed until late 2022. At the same time, they revealed that the closure and repairs bill for the section of the A59 at Kex gill was over £3 million for the period of 2009–2018. Plans for a 2.5-mile (4 km) bypass were submitted in December 2019, with the cost expected to be around £43.7 million. It is expected to be open early June 2026.

== Motorway proposals ==
Parts of the route could have become the M59 Motorway

A bypass road for Ormskirk and Burscough respectively was first proposed as part of James Drake's 1949 Road Plan for Lancashire, described as an all-purpose road but later considered to be a potential motorway by 1958 and given the designation of A59(M). By 1963, Lancashire County Council had dropped the plans for a motorway of this nature, instead deciding to focus later efforts during the mid-1970s on proposing a scheme to improve the A59 link between Liverpool and Preston. This proposal was at the time considered to potentially become the M59 motorway, with investigations into all practical options being considered, however the motorway was ultimately never constructed. A map published by Lancashire County Council and dated 1974 shows the suggested route of the motorway, starting at the missing M58 motorway junction 2 and continuing north-bound towards Blackpool along the alignment of the A59. However, the road could still happen after the completion of the Preston Western Distributor Road (A582) in July 2023.

== Road safety ==
The A59 has persistently featured in the top 10 most dangerous roads in Britain. A report by The Sunday Times in 2004 branded a section of road between the towns of Skipton and Harrogate as being "the most hazardous primary route in the nation", suggesting that the cost to implement safety measures to reduce the number of incidents could be in the region of £3 million. North Yorkshire County Council claimed they were taking steps to reduce fatalities on the road and that accidents on the stretch in question was still too high, despite the number of accidents in 2003 being at its lowest in six years. The newspaper had also reported on the lives of those who have lost loved ones on the road.

In 2008 European Road Assessment Programme reported the risk of being involved in a death or disabling injury accident as being between Low-medium and Medium-high depending on the section of road travelled. There were renewed calls in 2017 to improve the A59 in Ribble Valley, Lancashire, with MP Nigel Evans describing the A59 as a "dangerous road" whilst requesting the police carry out a full audit of accidents in an effort to tackle the problem. A proposal to improve safety of the road between Skipton and Harrogate, which is the only direct route between the towns, was discussed by councillors in March 2017. Numerous possible re-alignments are being considered in an effort to minimize or eradicate the impact of road closures, which has cost the council almost £1 million.

== Junction list ==
=== A59 ===
County	Location	mi	km	Destinations	Notes
Merseyside	Wallasey	0.0	0.0	M53 south – North Wales, Chester; A5139 west – Birkenhead, New Brighton, Wallasey	Western terminus; northern terminus of M53
Merseyside	Wallasey	1.1	1.8	A5027 – Birkenhead, Wallasey	Junction; westbound exit and eastbound entrance
Merseyside	Wallasey– Liverpool boundary	1.6– 3.2	2.6– 5.1	Kingsway Tunnel under River Mersey	
Merseyside	Liverpool	3.2– 3.8	5.1– 6.1	To M62 / A561 – City centre, Manchester, Widnes, Warrington, Birkenhead	Junction; Warrington and Birkenhead signed westbound only
Merseyside	Liverpool	3.9	6.3	Stanley Road (A567 north)	Some access via A5054
Merseyside	Liverpool	4.0	6.4	Boundary Street (A5054 west)	Some access via A567
Merseyside	Liverpool	4.4	7.1	A580 east to A5050 – Everton, Fazakerley	No access from A59 west to A580 or from A580 to A59 east; western terminus of A580
Merseyside	Liverpool	4.6	7.4	A5050 south (Kirkdale Vale) – Everton	No access from A59 east to A5050; northern terminus of A5050
Merseyside	Liverpool	5.3	8.5	Hale Road	
Merseyside	Liverpool	5.7	9.2	A5085 to M6 / M62 / A565 / A580 – Southport, Bootle, Manchester, Norris Green	
Merseyside	Liverpool	6.5	10.5	A5098 west (Hornby Road) to A566 – Bootle	To A566 signed westbound only; eastern terminus of A5098
Merseyside	Liverpool	6.8	10.9	A566 west (Orrell Lane) – Litherland, Netherton	Eastern terminus of A566
Merseyside	Liverpool	7.0	11.3	A506 north (Longmoor Lane) – Kirkby, Fazakerley	Information signed eastbound only; southern terminus of A506
Merseyside	Sefton	9.0– 9.2	14.5– 14.8	M57 southeast / M6 / M62 – Birmingham, Manchester, Kirkby A5036 southwest / A5758 west to A565 – Bootle, Southport, Formby	To M6, M62, A565, B'ham, M'cester, Kirkby, and Formby signed eastbound only; northwestern terminus of M57; northeastern terminus of A5036; eastern terminus of A5758
Merseyside	Sefton	9.3	15.0	M58 east to M6 – Skelmersdale, Preston	Junction; eastbound exit and westbound entrance; western terminus of M58
Merseyside	Maghull	10.5– 10.8	16.9– 17.4	A5147 north to A570 – Town centre, Southport, Sefton	Routes signed eastbound only; southern terminus of A5147
Lancashire	Ormskirk	15.3	24.6	A570 (Southport Road) to M58 – Southport, St Helens	
Lancashire	Burscough	17.6	28.3	A5209 east (Square Lane) to M6 – Parbold, Standish	Western terminus of A5209
Lancashire	Rufford	21.9	35.2	A581 east (Croston Road) – Croston, Chorley	Western terminus of A581
Lancashire	Tarleton	23.8	38.3	A565 south (Southport New Road) / Church Road – Southport, Holmes, Hesketh Bank, Tarleton	Holmes signed eastbound only; northern terminus of A565
Lancashire	Penwortham	30.8	49.6	A582 east to Bank Top Road / Millbrook Way / M6 / M61 / M65 / A6 – Leyland, Chorley	Western terminus of A582 concurrency
Lancashire	Preston	32.6– 32.9	52.5– 52.9	A582 west / A583 to A584 / B6241 / B6242 – Blackpool, Lytham St Annes, Longridge	Junction; only To A583 and Blackpool signed westbound; eastern terminus of A582 concurrency
Lancashire	Preston	33.3	53.6	Corporation Street (A5071 north)	Southern terminus of A5071
Lancashire	Preston	33.7	54.2	A6 north (North Road) to M6 / M55 / A583 – Lancaster, Blackpool	Western terminus of A6 concurrency
Lancashire	Preston	34.0	54.7	Ribbleton Lane (A6063 north) / B6243 – Longridge	Southern terminus of A6063
Lancashire	Preston	34.2	55.0	A6 south (London Road) – Chorley	Eastern terminus of A6 concurrency
Lancashire	Preston	35.2	56.6	Blackpool Road (A5085 west) / M55 / A583 / B6243 – Blackpool, Longridge	To M55 signed eastbound only, To B6243 and Longridge westbound only; eastern terminus of A5085
Lancashire	Samlesbury	36.3– 36.5	58.4– 58.7	M6 – The Lakes, The South, Birmingham, Liverpool	M6 junction 31
Lancashire	Samlesbury	37.8	60.8	A677 east (Preston New Road) to M65 – Burnley, Blackburn	Western terminus of A677
Lancashire	Langho	45.4	73.1	A666 south / Whalley Road – Blackburn, Whalley, Langho, Billington	Langho and Billington signed westbound only; northern terminus of A666
Lancashire	Whalley– Wiswell boundary	47.9	77.1	A671 south to A680 / M65 – Burnley, Padiham, Accrington, Blackburn	Padiham signed eastbound only, To M65 westbound only; western terminus of A671 concurrency
Lancashire	Pendleton	49.0	78.9	A671 north (Whalley Road) – Clitheroe, Barrow, Whalley	A671 signed eastbound only, Whalley westbound only; eastern terminus of A671 concurrency
Lancashire	Worston	51.5	82.9	A671 south (Pimlico Link Road) – Clitheroe, Chatburn, West Bradford, }Waddington	A671 and Clitheroe signed westbound only; northern terminus of A671
Lancashire	Gisburn	57.7	92.9	A682 south (Burnley Road) / Park Lane – Nelson	Western terminus of A682 concurrency
Lancashire	Gisburn	57.9	93.2	A682 north (Hellifield Road) / Black Lane / A65 – Kendal, Settle, Long Preston, Hellifield, Nappa	Eastern terminus of A682 concurrency
North Yorkshire	Broughton	64.4	103.6	A56 west (Colne and Broughton Road) to A682 / B6252 – Earby, Colne, Burnley, Barnoldswick	To B6252 and Barnoldswick signed westbound only; eastern terminus of A56
North Yorkshire	Stirton with Thorlby	66.6	107.2	A6069 east (Broughton Road) – Skipton	Western terminus of A6069
North Yorkshire	Stirton with Thorlby	67.4	108.5	A65 northwest / A629 south / Gargrave Road to A650 – Kendal, Keighley, Bradford, Gargrave, Settle	Western terminus of A65 concurrency; northern terminus of A629
North Yorkshire	Skipton	69.5	111.8	The Bailey (A6131 south) – Skipton, Embsay	No access from A59 east to A6131; northern terminus of A6131
North Yorkshire	Skipton	70.1	112.8	A65 southeast – Leeds, Ilkley	Eastern terminus of A65 concurrency
North Yorkshire	Harrogate	88.7	142.7	A61 (Ripon Road) – Town centre, Ripon, Leeds	Leeds signed westbound only
North Yorkshire	Harrogate	90.3	145.3	A661 southeast (Wetherby Road) / A6040 southwest (Knaresborough) to A1 / A61 – Town centre, The North, The South, Wetherby, Leeds, York	Northwestern terminus of A661; northeastern terminus of A6040
North Yorkshire	Knaresborough	92.8	149.3	A6055 north (Boroughbridge Road) to A1(M) north – Boroughbridge	Southern terminus of A6055
North Yorkshire	Goldsborough	94.6	152.2	A658 west / Greystone Farms to A661 – Bradford, Harrogate, Goldsborough, Skipton	Skipton signed westbound only; eastern terminus of A658
North Yorkshire	Hopperton	96.9	155.9	A1(M) – The North, The South, Scotch Corner, Wetherby	A1(M) junction 47
North Yorkshire	Hopperton	97.1	156.3	A168 – Boroughbridge, Walshford	
North Yorkshire	Upper Poppleton– Nether Poppleton boundary	107.0	172.2	A1237 to A19 / A64 – York (N), Scarborough, Thirsk, Selby, Leeds, Nether Poppleton, Acomb, Rufforth, Knapton	York signed eastbound only
North Yorkshire	York	108.3	174.3	Water End (A1176 northeast) – Clifton	Southwestern terminus of A1176
North Yorkshire	York	109.6	176.4	Blossom Street (A1036 north) – City centre	Information signed eastbound only; western terminus of A1036 concurrency
North Yorkshire	York	109.7	176.5	The Mount (A1036 south) to A19 / A64 – Leeds, Harrogate, Thirsk	Information signed westbound only; eastern terminus of A1036 concurrency
North Yorkshire	York	110.2	177.3	Nunnery Lane / Bishopgate Street (A1036)	Eastern terminus
1.000 mi = 1.609 km; 1.000 km = 0.621 mi: Concurrency terminus; Incomplete access
