= A5058 road =

Ring road in Liverpool, England

A5058

Route information
- Maintained by Liverpool City Council
- Length: 8.2 mi (13.2 km)
- History: Constructed 1903-1927

Major junctions
- north end: Bootle 53°26′35″N 3°00′06″W
- A565 A567 A5057 A5038; A59 A580 A5049; A57 A5080 A562
- south end: Sefton Park 53°22′50″N 2°55′53″W

Location
- Country: United Kingdom
- Primary destinations: Liverpool

Road network
- Roads in the United Kingdom; Motorways; A and B road zones

The A5058 road, known as Queens Drive for much of its length, is a major ring road in Liverpool. The eastern section of the A5058 connects Breeze Hill in Bootle at the intersection with the A59, with Aigburth Vale in Aigburth at the other end.

The road has been described as being the first ring road to be built in the country and was designed around the idea that future growth would require a substantial road, despite no development reaching the area around the road until many years later. The road played a crucial role in offering development opportunities during the early 20th century, at a time when slum housing was being cleared in Liverpool City Centre and land was sought for new housing.

== History ==
=== Planning ===
Often described as the first ring road in Britain, planning had been in discussion since the 19th century, with a circular boulevard plan proposed in 1853 although ultimately it did not materialise. Construction of the road began in the early 20th century and was designed by civil engineer John Alexander Brodie. Initially conceived with tram tracks running along the centre of the road, it was ultimately decided that a dual-carriageway formation was necessary in order to handle the anticipated increased traffic volumes.

=== Construction ===
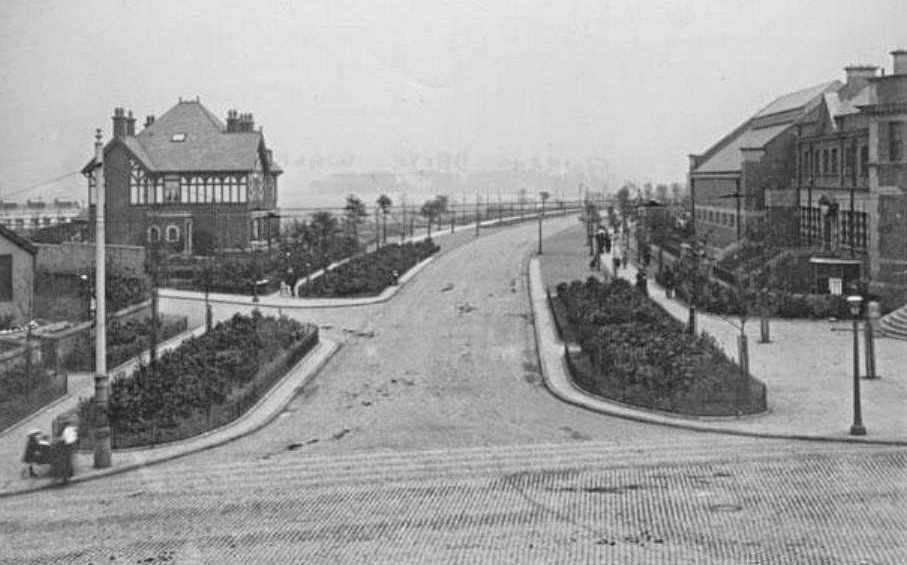
Queens Drive, Walton, Liverpool, pictured in 1909

The first section of road to be constructed was just to the east of the junction with the A59 road. Several existing roads, such as Black Horse Lane and Priory Road were incorporated into the new carriageway, some of which were realigned to fit with the plans, whilst new sections of road filled in the gaps. Extensive parts of the carriageway were planted with uniformly spaced out trees along lengthy sections, long before any planned built development in the surrounding area. The road played a significant role during the 1920s and 1930s, when new areas for housing development were required to rehouse people from slum clearances in the city centre.
