= Switch Island =

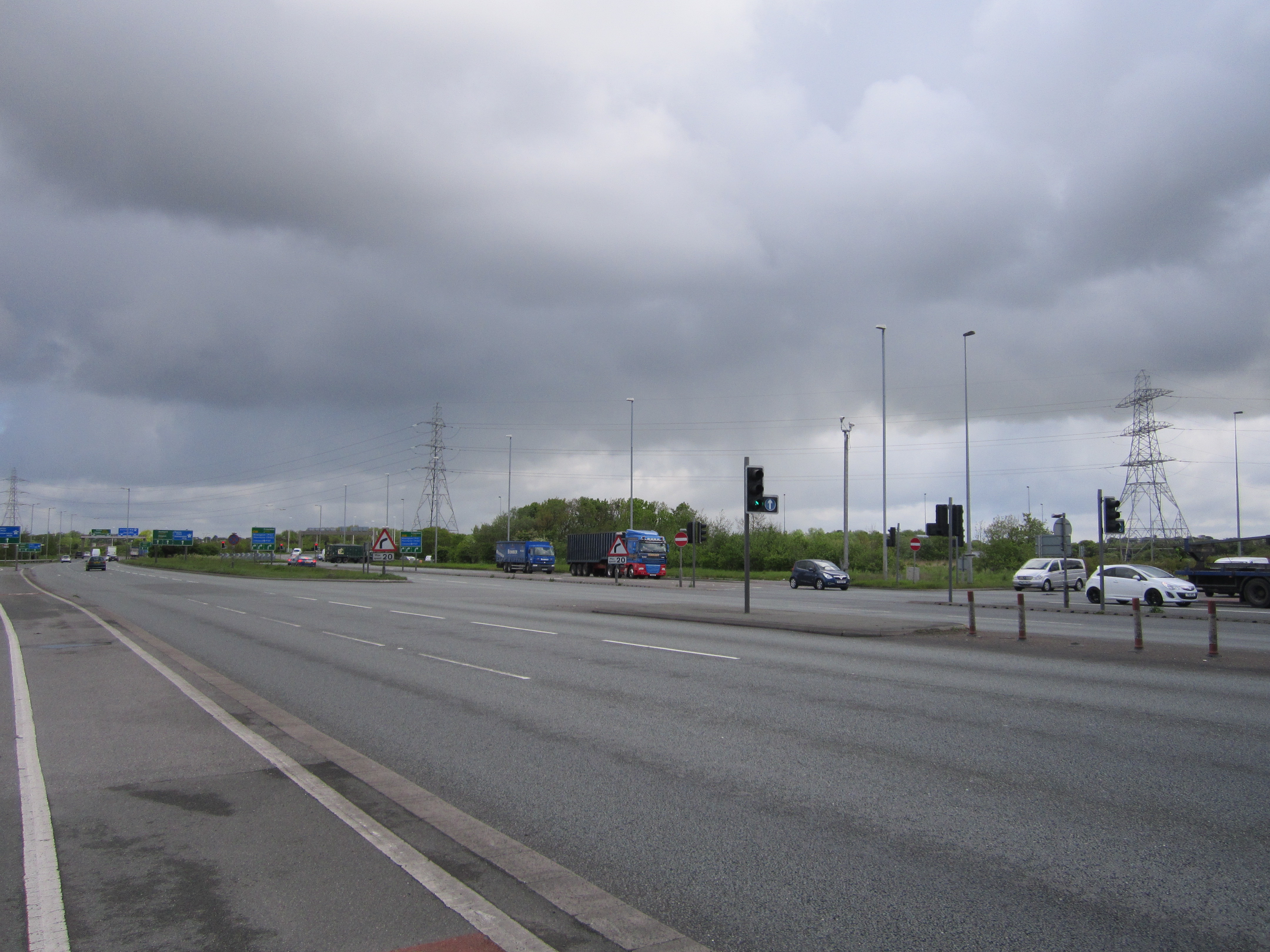
- Dunnings Bridge Road looking towards Ormskirk and showing the characteristic flat and isolated landscape
- Interactive map of Switch Island

Location
- Sefton, Merseyside
- Coordinates: 53.4936°N 2.9527°W
- Roads at junction: M57; M58; A59; A5036; A5758

Construction
- Opened: 1930s (small roundabout); 2010s (current formation)
- Maintained by: National Highways

Location in Merseyside
Location in UK motorway network

Switch Island is a major road junction near Aintree in Merseyside, England, in the Metropolitan Borough of Sefton. The junction is at the western terminus of both the M57 and M58 motorways, which converge on the A59 trunk road, the north-south route from Liverpool. The junction is also the terminus of the A5036, a road which serves the Port of Liverpool, and the A5758 which serves as a bypass for the village of Thornton.

For the period between the 1930s and mid 1970s, the island was a simple roundabout formation until the arrival of the motorways. The junction was significantly expanded in 1980 and was initially planned to be an interim layout, however subsequent additions and amendments throughout the years, separate to the original intentions, has transformed it from the original roundabout design and then-envisaged grade separated junction.

The junction carries up to 100,000 vehicles a day with continued improvements being a priority for National Highways. The through route of the dual carriageway is not the A59 south to the A59 north, but from the A5036 south to the A59 north, effectively resulting in two motorways and the port road feeding onto the A59 through route. Switch Island has been described as one of England’s busiest motorway junctions and is prone to traffic collisions due to its extensive utilisation and inadequate layout.

== History ==
=== Original formation ===
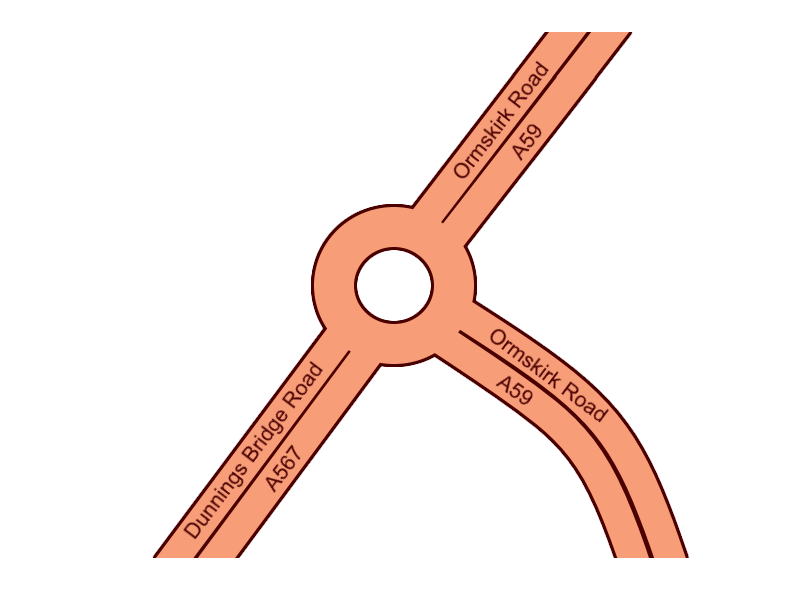
The first roundabout layout, linking the A59 road to what was then the A567 road

The junction originates from the construction of Dunnings Bridge Road during the 1930s, linking what is now known as the A59 to the A5036 (then known as the A567 road). Starting as a simple t-junction, a roundabout appeared on maps from the late 1930s. The etymology of the name "switch island" is uncertain, although references to the new "switch road" linking Maghull to northern Liverpool appeared in 1938 upon the link road's opening. The earliest media references to "switch island" can be dated to the mid-1950s.

The junction remained unchanged until construction of the M57 motorway in 1974, when the original island fell out of use as the layout around it changed to accommodate motorway junction roads. A road map from 1975 shows the original island alongside new roads to the east connecting the motorway.

=== Motorway junctions ===
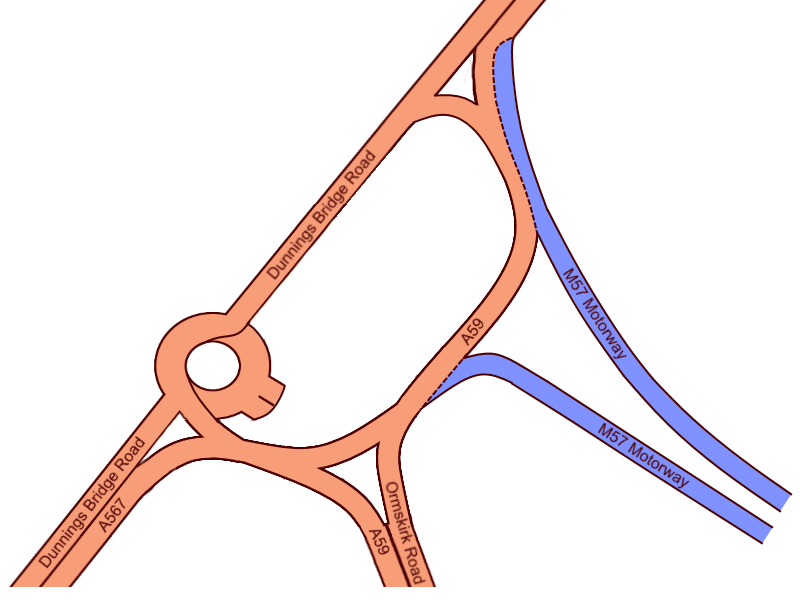
Switch Island with the then-new M57 connected

During phase 2 of the M57 construction in the mid 1970s, the motorway was routed to terminate at the junction, which involved constructing a new link road for the entry and exit sliproads, with the original roundabout becoming largely redundant. The new road connecting the M57 motorway would later become the eastern section of the future island roundabout.

The previous two-way traffic road changed to a northbound route only, with southbound traffic now using the new motorway link road, connecting up to the A59 road at what was the former roundabout.

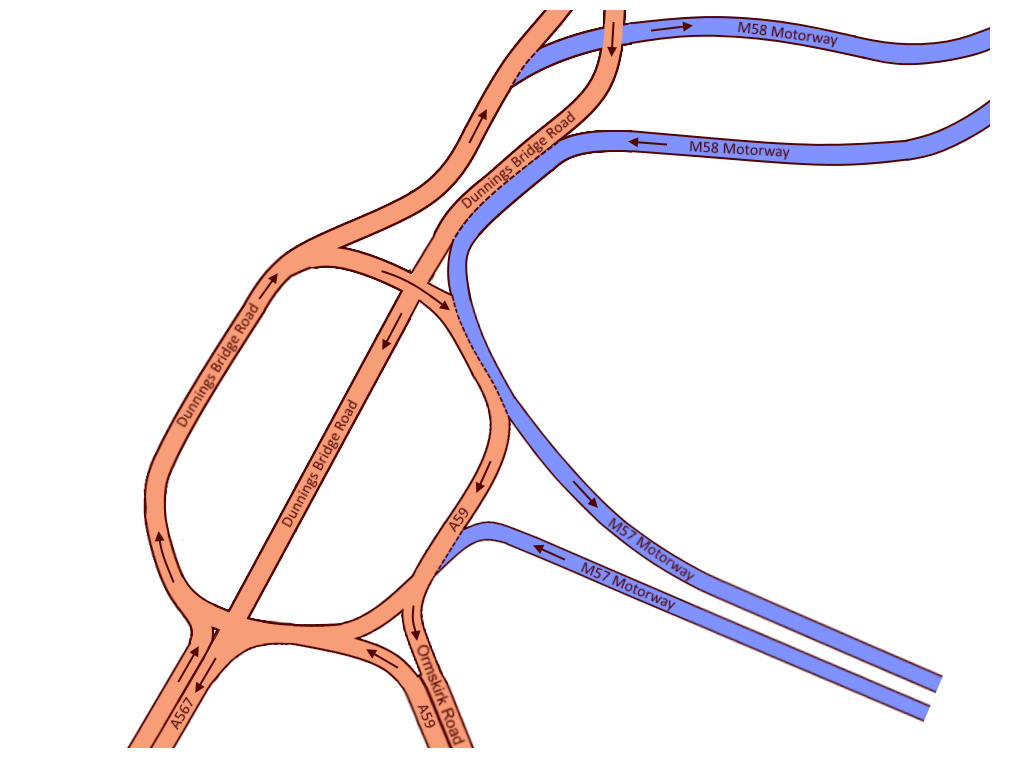
Switch Island after M58 motorway construction

This section of the M58 was part of a £12.1 million contract given to Alfred McAlpine of Wirral, from Aintree to the Lancashire boundary, being 3.7 miles (6.0 km). This section was planned to open on 22 August 1980, but opened on 21 September 1980, and was six months late. The western mile-long section, from Switch Island, was only two lanes, but had a wide central reservation, to allow a possible upgrade to three lanes.

Subsequent to the M58 motorway being constructed and also linked to the junction, the western half of the island was constructed thus completing a roundabout island that was entirely separate to what had been originally constructed prior to the motorways. The plans for the two motorways involved them converging at this junction then continuing west, whilst the A59 continued uninterrupted under (or over) the island in a grade separation arrangement, with slip roads to and from the junction. These plans never saw fruition and instead all roads converge at a single flat level intersection junction.

Aside from various improvement works over the years, the configuration of the island from 1980 onwards has changed little, with the exception of considerably more traffic utilising the junction and additional roads being constructed within and to the junction.

=== Junction improvements ===
The junction underwent a minor redesign in 2006 when new section of carriageway was built at the M57 terminus, allowing motorists to directly transfer onto either the A5036 or A59 roads. The primary objective was to ensure the junction could withstand the predicted increase in road traffic for the next decade and help improve the flow of an estimated 43,000 vehicles daily. At this time, the island was handling up to 80,000 vehicles every day, of which 10% were heavy goods vehicles and resulting in extensive traffic queues leading to increased risks of traffic accidents. The roadworks completed in Spring 2006, resulting in a revised junction layout and removing the roundabout configuration. A short stretch of the original roundabout remained in existence to be utilised as an inspection area and weighbridge, operated by the Vehicle Inspectorate; this was reconstructed following construction of the new Thornton to Switch island link road which has carriageway in some parts of the old roundabout.

In September 2013, Sefton Council approved construction of the long-campaigned Thornton to Switch island link road, which started construction towards the end of the 2013 calendar year and opened on 19 August 2015 as the A5758 Broom's Cross Road. The route connects to the junction at its western side and provides a more efficient route from the A565 road. Further improvements were announced in April 2017 for work to take place during 2018, including new traffic light installations, changes to lane markings, new barriers between carriageways and improved signage.

In May 2018 these roadworks were named as the most dangerous in England.

== Operation ==
The junction is prone to traffic collisions, which has been exacerbated since the opening of the Thornton bypass in 2015. This has further complicated and changed an already complex and congested junction, which is one of Europe's busiest road junctions. Motorists have identified unclear and missing road markings as contributing towards the increase in collisions at the island, resulting in Sefton Council, who are responsible for the junction, making a number of amendments during 2016 as a result of feedback and ongoing reviews. In a 5 year period throughout 2013-2017, there were over 60 collisions at the junction, of which around 10% were classed as severe. As of 2017, an estimated 90,000 vehicles a day pass through the island.

== Routes ==
The junction serves the following routes, some of which terminate at the island;

Route	Destination(s)
M57	Kirkby, Liverpool (S) & Airport, Birmingham (M6), Manchester (M62)
M58	Skelmersdale, Preston (M6)
A59	Liverpool, Ormskirk, Southport (A570)
A5036	Bootle, All Docks
A5758	Southport, Formby (A565), Thornton, Sefton, Crosby

== Future proposals ==
Proposals have been put forward by Highways England to build a new link road through Rimrose Valley to ease congestion on the A5036 route for traffic heading towards the motorways via Switch Island. The proposal has been met with local opposition, with suggestions that the road through the valley would be destructive towards public health, wildlife and air quality.
