= Listed buildings in Aintree Village =

Aintree Village is a civil parish in Sefton, Merseyside, England. It contains six buildings recorded in the National Heritage List for England as designated listed buildings, all listed at Grade II. This grade is the lowest of the three gradings given to listed buildings and is applied to "buildings of national importance and special interest". The parish is a residential area to the north of Liverpool. It contains the Aintree Racecourse, and the Leeds and Liverpool Canal. The listed buildings consist of houses, a stand on the racecourse, and a canal bridge.

Name and location	Photograph	Date	Notes
Valley House; 53.47861°N 2.92491°W	—	17th century	The house is in brick with stone dressings, and has a slate roof. It is in two storeys, and has a two-bay entrance front, the right bay projecting forward under a gable. The windows are mullioned with five lights, and the entrance is in a lean-to porch to the left. There is an extension at the rear of the house.
3 and 4 Mill Square; 53.47969°N 2.93221°W		18th century	Originating as a farm building, it was later converted into a two houses. These are built in brick with a stone-slate roof. The houses are in two storeys, and each has a front of two bays. The windows are in various types.
1 and 2 Mill Square; 53.47974°N 2.93244°W	—	1765	Originating as a farmhouse, and later converted into two houses, the building is in brick with a stone-slate roof. It is in two storeys, and has a front of three bays, the right bay having been added in the 20th century. The windows in the original part are horizontally-sliding sashes; those in the new bay are casements. On the front is a datestone.
5, 6 and 7 Mill Square; 53.47977°N 2.93203°W	—	Late 18th century	A terrace of three houses in brick with a stone-slate roof. They are in two storeys, and each house has a three-bay front. The houses have segmentally-headed entrances, and the windows are horizontally-sliding sashes, all with segmental heads.
Blue Anchor Bridge; 53.47927°N 2.93793°W		1831	The bridge carries Melling Road over the Leeds and Liverpool Canal. It is constructed in stone and consists of a single elliptical arch with rusticated voussoirs, it has a dated keystone and piers at the ends.
County Stand, Aintree Racecourse; 53.47479°N 2.95252°W	—	1885	The stand replaced one of 1829 that was destroyed by fire. It is built in brick with stone dressings, and is in two storeys with a roof terrace. The stand has a front of 41 bays, the tiered roof terrace being carried on cast iron columns.
