= A5758 road =

Road in Merseyside, England

A5758

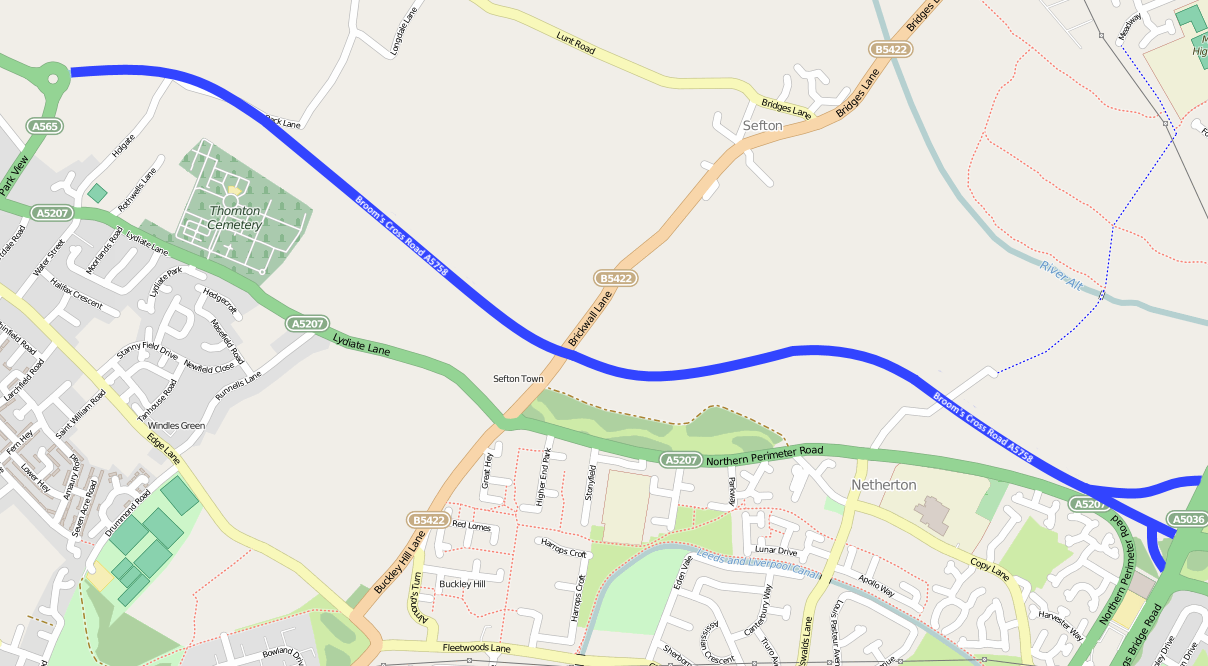

Route information
- Length: 2.2 mi (3.5 km)
- Existed: 2015–present
- History: First proposed during 1960s

Major junctions
- From: Thornton
- A565; M57; M58; A59; A5036
- To: Switch Island

Location
- Country: United Kingdom

Road network
- Roads in the United Kingdom; Motorways; A and B road zones
← A5630	→ A6001

The A5758 road (also known as Broom's Cross Road or the Thornton Bypass) is a 2.2-mile (3.5 km) single-carriageway road in Merseyside, England, constructed during 2014–15 and linking the A565 road in Thornton to Switch Island junction. The road is officially named the A5758 Broom's Cross Road, with Broom's Cross being the site of a medieval wayside cross near Thornton and the road numbering referencing the two motorways the road links to, the M57 and M58 motorway respectively.

== Development ==
=== Discussions ===
Discussions about the need for the road to be constructed date back to the construction of Switch Island junction, with numerous public consultations held throughout the years to ascertain public support and opinion on the need for the road and the alignment it would take. The consultations have produced favourable responses from the majority of respondents, with several different alignment suggestions being proposed over the years.

Sefton Council gave their final approval in September 2013, with construction starting towards the end of the 2013 calendar year. The cost was in the region of £20.4 million, with the UK Government contributing £14.5M towards that and Sefton Council contributing £5.9M. The financial benefits over the 6 years following construction of the road has been estimated to be in the region of £140–200M.

=== Early proposals ===
The need for an improved route between Switch Island and the main Southport Road was first identified during the early 1930s. Around that time, workmen "pegged out" a route across farmland near Ince Woods which never materialised. Further proposals were discussed in 1968, during planning for the M57, M58, and M62 motorways. Shortly after the motorways opened, a number of proposals to allow traffic to bypass Thornton and Netherton were developed, given increased road traffic over the years that followed added to the congestion throughout Thornton. The location on where a road would be built was a controversial subject during the 20th century, due to close proximity to Ince Woods and environmental concerns. County planners of the time favoured widening the A565 road.

In 1990, a detailed proposal known as the Blue Route was submitted for planning permission, which would have involved a 4.7-mile (7.6 km) dual carriageway road between Switch Island and the Formby Bypass. This proposal was ultimately rejected by then Secretary of State for Transport in May 1995 despite favourable public consensus, on the grounds it would have negative impact on greenbelt land and be detrimental to conservation areas and protected species.

A Sefton Council environmental statement in 2010 made reference to the traffic congestion that had affected routes around the Thornton area for "many years", as well as the impacts to quality of life and the environment.

=== Public consultations ===
In May 2000, a public consultation began which proposed six possible options, with the intention to understand the views and opinions of residents and businesses along the route between Thornton and Switch Island. Following feedback, six options were considered for possible highway construction, those being:

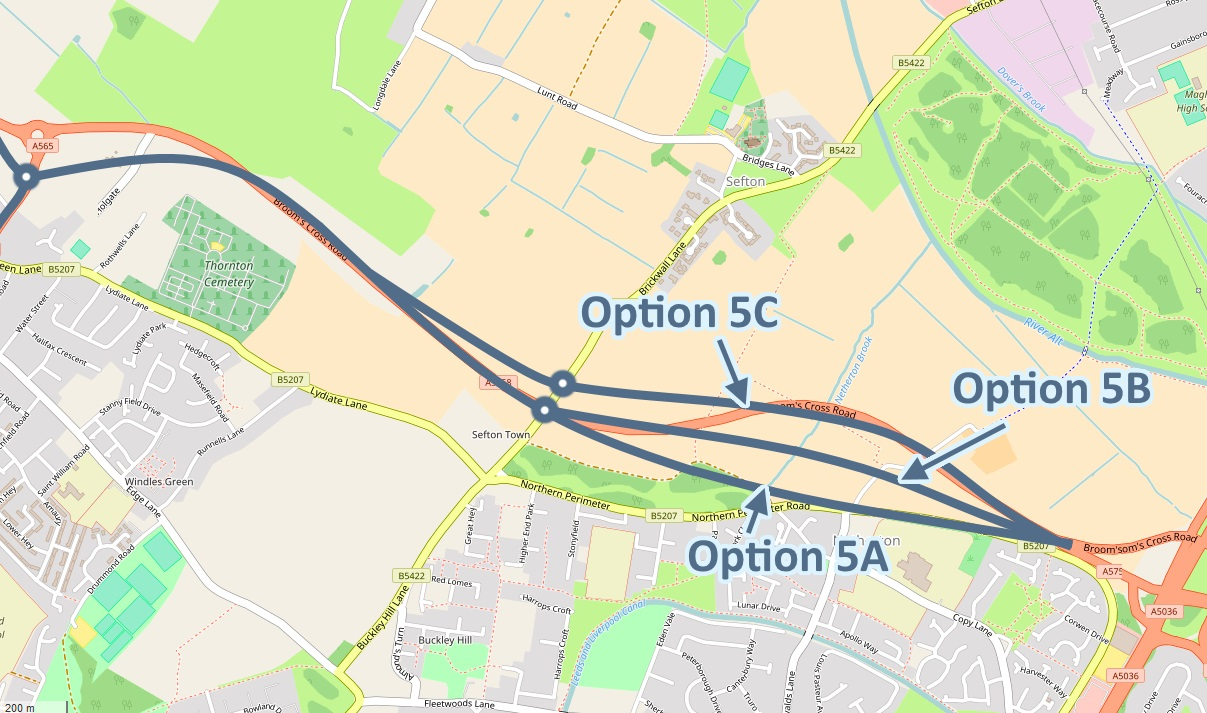
Variations of Option 5

- Option 1: Minimum approach involving maintenance and improved signage
- Option 2: Switch Island Link Road and junction improvements at Brickwall Lane
- Option 3: Co-ordinated improvements involving a Thornton bypass, Brickwall Lane enhancements and Switch Island Link Road
- Option 4: Co-ordinated improvements involving a Thornton bypass, Netherton Relief Road and Switch Island Link Road
- Option 5: Single carriageway road between Switch Island the A565 Southport Road
- Option 6: Dual carriageway between Switch Island and Formby Bypass

Of all the considered options, Option 5 performed well during the appraisal process and was identified as being the preferred option to pursue by Sefton Council. A further consultation was undertaken in 2003, during which questionnaires were distributed to ascertain resident and business viewpoints on the proposal identified in the 2000 consultation; it determined nearly 80% of respondents agreed for the need of a new road as proposed, with the majority of those questioned strongly agreeing. Of those that did not agree to the preferred option, nearly a third (30%) expressed concerns that the proposal may result in increased congestion, whilst a quarter (25%) expressed a preference for the route to be constructed as a dual carriageway.

View source data.
Feedback on 2006 proposals (% of respondents)

During a further consultation held 2006, local residents and businesses were sent another questionnaire asking them how strongly they agreed or disagreed with the proposed alignment and the need to restrict traffic levels and speeds once the proposed road had opened. Of the 12807 questionnaires that were sent, 10.9% were returned, with a further 100 completed at public exhibitions and online; the majority of responses were in agreement with the proposed alignment.

=== Final decision ===
Following the 2006 public consultation, the scheme for a single-carriageway link to Thornton was given high priority and accepted in July 2006 by the then-Secretary of State for Transport, Douglas Alexander. Funding was approved by the Department for Transport in February 2011 when Sefton Council accepted the terms and conditions that has been proposed. After two objections were raised regarding the compulsory purchase order needed to acquire the land on which the road was to be built, a public inquiry was held in October 2012. Subsequent to this, the government inspector approved the plans. Following Sefton Council giving their final approval in September 2013, construction was proposed to begin by early November 2013 for a period of around 12 months, with the financial benefits estimated to be in the region of £140–200 million over the 60 years post-construction.

== Construction ==
Following the completion of land acquisition, contractors Balfour Beatty marked out the route of the bypass in October 2013 offering the first glimpse of where the road would be built.

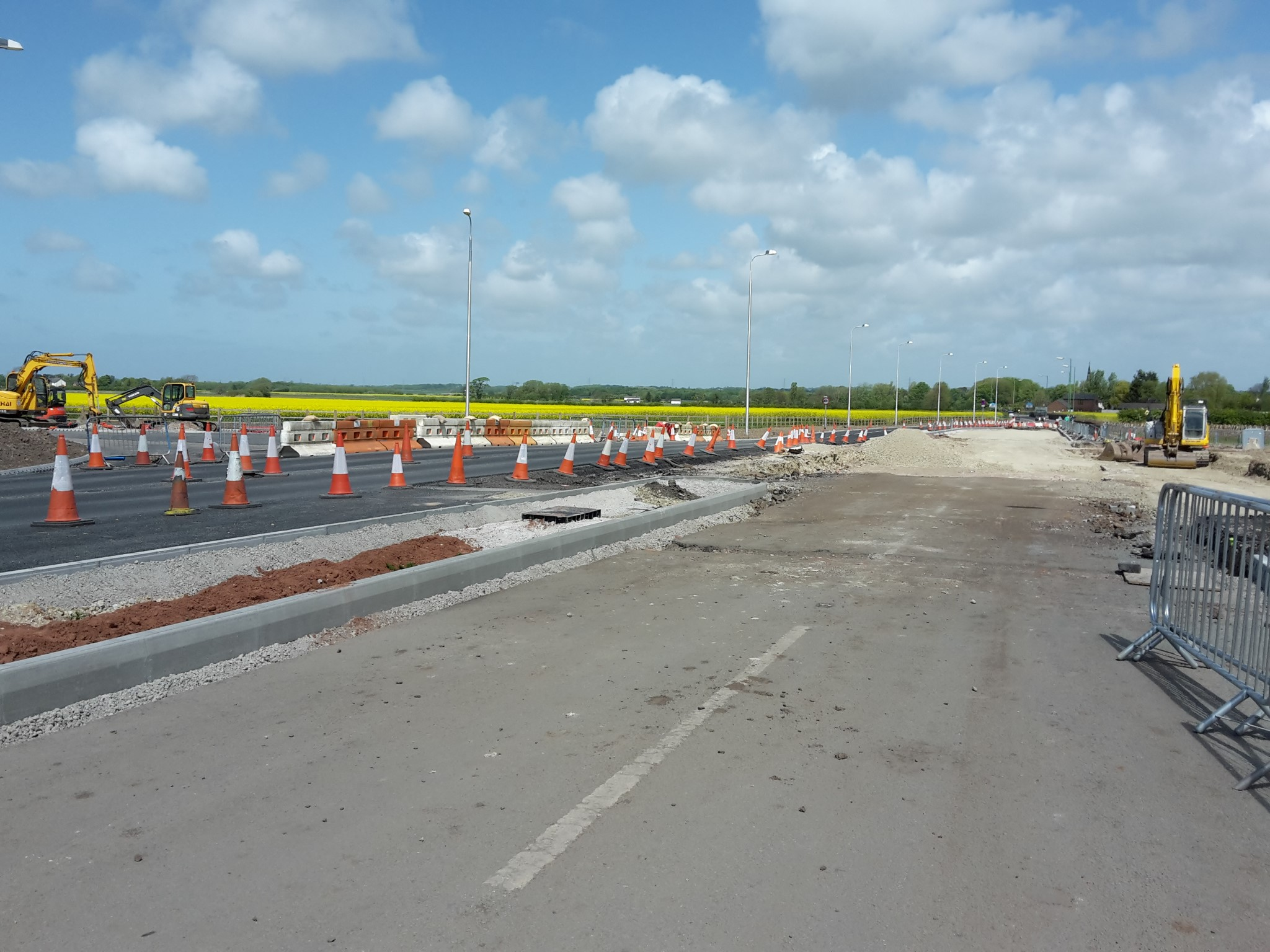
Construction works for new road at Brickwall Lane junction

Initial land works began in January 2014 with an expected completion date in the final quarter of 2014. In November 2014 it was reported that the project had been delayed due to poor weather and ground conditions, with the completion date pushed back to Spring 2015. Despite this, construction works to connect the new road to the main junction at Switch Island concluded by the end of December 2014, with the second phase of works taking place mostly throughout the night in January 2015 to minimise disruption. The road surface began to be laid in February 2015 with a revised opening of Spring 2015 forecast. Reports in March 2015 confirmed that due to frost and rainfall, the date of opening had been postponed to at least May 2015.

After further slippage in the timescales, the opening date was revised from late June 2015 to 19 August 2015. The delay was explained as being due to needing to undertake additional work to stabilise the road foundation in two locations to make it suitable to lay tarmac on. The road finally opened on the evening of 19 August 2015, costing £20.4M in total, of which Sefton Council funded £5.9M (approximately 30%) of the cost.

== Route ==
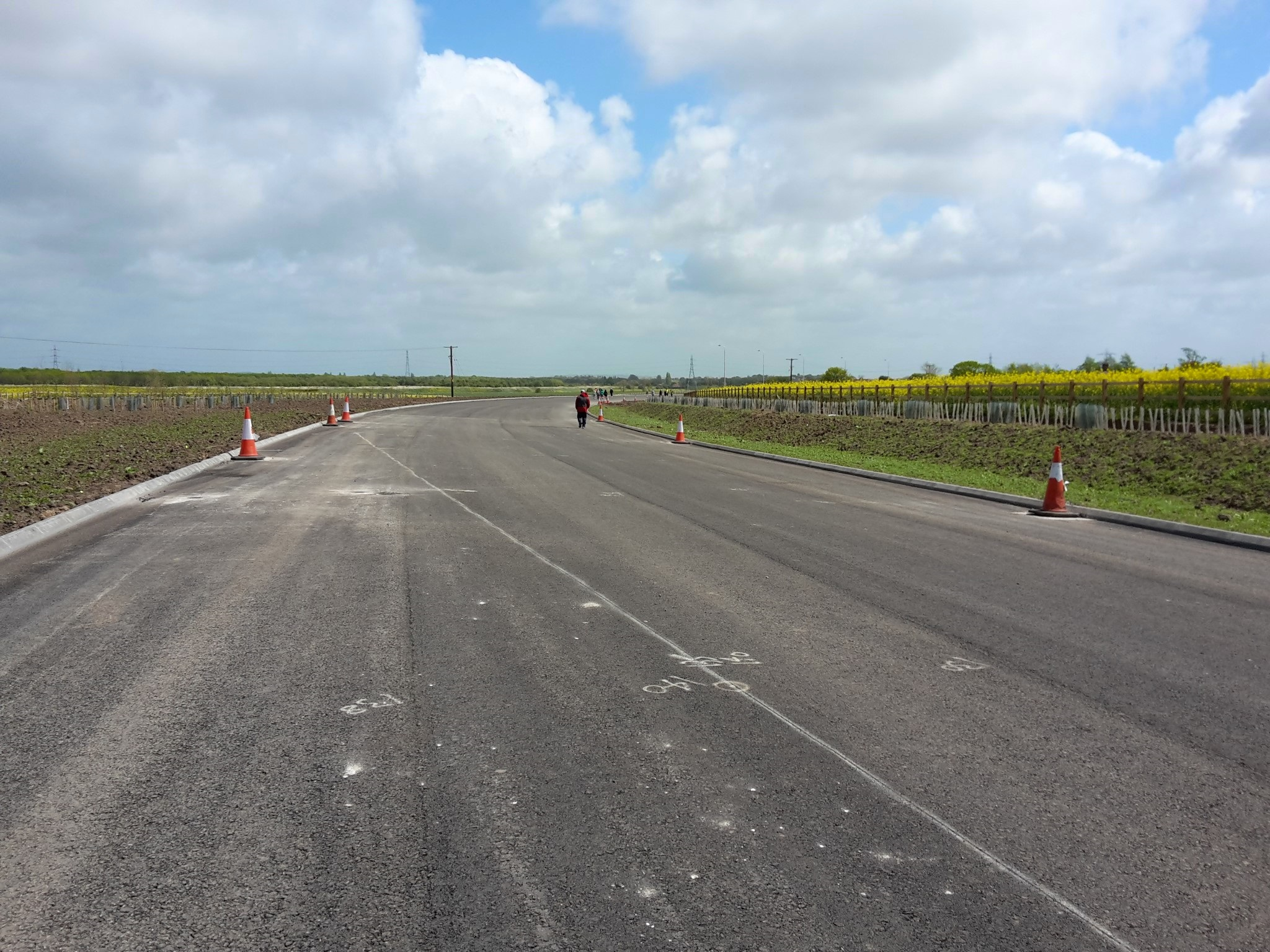
Heading towards Switch Island from Brickwall Lane, during a charitable walk

The route is constructed as a 10-metre-wide (33 ft), two lane single carriageway with 1-metre-wide (3.3 ft) hardstrips and a 2.5-metre-wide (8.2 ft) verge, with an 80-kilometre-per-hour (50 mph) speed limit. The road has some sections on low embankment and others in shallow cutting where it runs close to existing residential properties, but is mostly close to existing ground level. Surface drainage is collected by a kerb and gully system and discharged into four new attenuation ponds. The route is only lit where there are specific safety reasons for doing so, such as at junctions and crossings along the route. There are no footways along the route other than specific pedestrian crossing points.

The road starts at Switch Island junction, with direct connections to its namesake motorways (M57 and M58 respectively), as well as the A5036 and A59 roads which all converge at the junction. The road closely follows the route of the Northern Perimeter Road which is to its south, with the only major intersection being when it crosses the B5422 road. From there it continues in a northwest direction until it meets the A565 road, at a roundabout constructed as part of the scheme to improve efficiency for converging traffic.

== Operation ==
Several months after opening in December 2015, a Sefton Council committee meeting recorded that the road was being very well used, with noticeably less traffic on the roads it was bypassing, those being the Northern Perimeter Road and Lydiate Lane respectively. It was subsequently reported in January 2016 that a section of the road would need to undergo a series of repair works during the evenings of a three-week period, just five months after the road opened to traffic. A year after opening, road users were giving generally positive feedback, with some confirming that travel times had been reduced and offers a more convenient means of accessing the motorways, although a common recurring concern were the junction issues at Switch Island.

Since opening, there have been reports relating to an increased number of road traffic incidents at Switch Island, the main terminus of the A5758 road. Some road users have noted that a lack of clear road markings and signage may be a contributing factor towards the traffic collisions, whilst Sefton Council noted that they continue to review the operation of the road and associated junctions. Following continued incidents at the junction with Switch Island, the council confirmed in July 2016 that it was in talks with Highways England and Merseyside Police with Bill Esterson, MP for Sefton Central, calling for changes to be considered to the road to improve safety.

Plans were announced in February 2016 which proposed a new £200M road could be built through Rimrose Valley to link directly into the A5758 road in an effort to reduce the heavy congestion on the A5036 road; Sefton Council rejected the proposal in March 2017, citing the desire to instead build a tunnel to overcome the congestion concerns.
