= M58 motorway =

Motorway in England

M58

- M58 highlighted in blue Shown with North West England motorway network

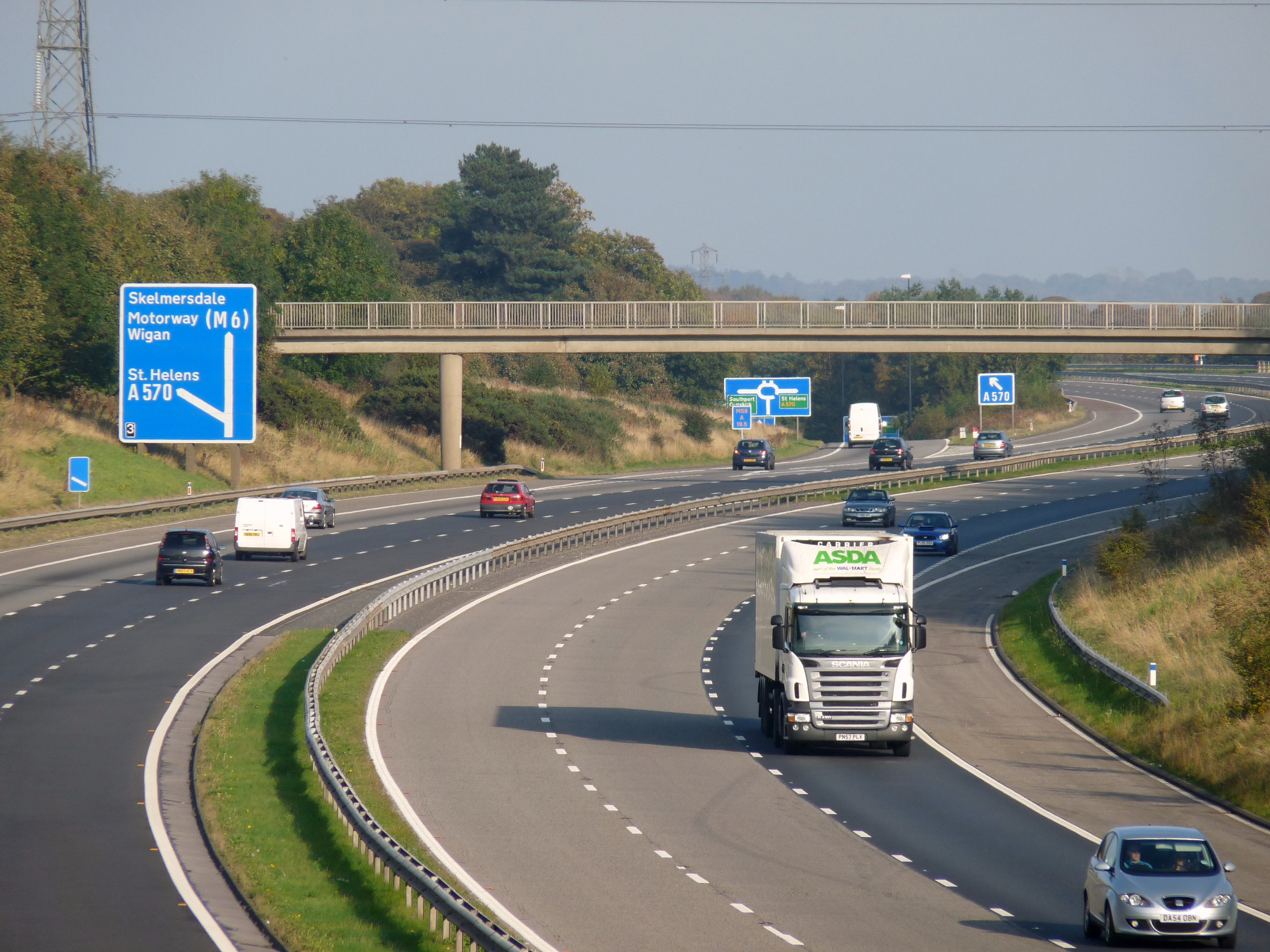
- Junction 3 looking east, 2008

Route information
- Maintained by National Highways
- Length: 12 mi (19 km)
- Existed: 1977–present
- History: Constructed 1977–80

Major junctions
- West end: Aintree; Switch Island
- M57 motorway; J6 → M6 motorway
- East end: Orrell

Location
- Country: United Kingdom
- Primary destinations: Liverpool, Skelmersdale, Southport, Wigan

Road network
- Roads in the United Kingdom; Motorways; A and B road zones
← M57	→ M60

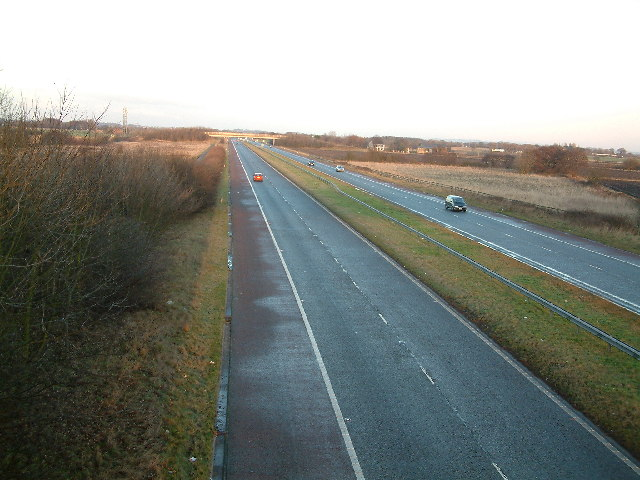
Near Melling Mount, 2005

The M58 is a motorway passing through Merseyside and Lancashire, terminating in Greater Manchester. It is 12 miles (19.3 km) long and provides a link between the M6 motorway and the Metropolitan Borough of Sefton and hence on, via the A5036, to the Mersey docks in Liverpool and Birkenhead.

== Route ==
Apart from the approaches to its terminal roundabouts, the motorway is three lanes throughout. It starts at Switch Island in Merseyside and passes directly underneath the Merseyrail Northern Line. before striking out across open countryside and into Lancashire south of Maghull and Bickerstaffe. It then curves south Easterly south of Skelmersdale before reaching the M6 at Orrell in the Metropolitan Borough of Wigan, Greater Manchester.

== History ==
Since 1949 an upgrade of the Wigan to Ormskirk route had been proposed to improve traffic flows, yet with the decision in 1961 to develop Skelmersdale as a new town, the proposals were revised to provide a link to the M6 at one end and Liverpool at the other.

=== Skelmersdale Up Holland Bypass ===
In October 1965 the Skelmersdale Town Regional Road would cost £2 million, a 3.5-mile (5.6 km) single carriageway, which would be constructed in a form to allow later upgrades to dual three-lane motorway standards, to begin in 1966. There had always been a plan of a route from Aintree to Preston. There would be access roads at Gillibrands, Digmoor and Pimbo.

The first part of the road was opened in late March 1968, as the 'kelmersdale Regional Road between what is now junctions 4 and 5. It was built by Sir Alfred McAlpine and Fairclough Civil Engineering, who built most of Skelmersdale's spine roads. It was originally a two-lane single carriageway road that was upgraded to two-lane plus with hard shoulders in 1973. The Regional Road was planned to be finished by 1970.

The next stage was to connect this road to the M6 and construction on this part began in 1968 and it was opened to traffic in October 1970 as all purpose dual carriageway. The M6 Link, the second stage of the Skelmersdale Up Holland Bypass, was opened on 1 October 1970 by Hervey Rhodes, Baron Rhodes, built by Dowsett Engineering Construction.

From September 1971 the first section of 1.5 miles (2.4 km) began construction for an upgrade to dual carriageway. This dual carriageway opened on 8 January 1973, from the A5068 (junction 4) to the A577 (junction 5).

=== Construction as a motorway restrictions road ===
Junctions 5 to 6, of the regional road was upgraded to dual three lanes with a hard shoulder in 1977. These roads were upgraded to motorway status in 1977. Construction started around March 1976, being mostly an upgrade of the 'Regional Road', the A506. This section opened on 17 September 1977, being 3.5 miles to the M6.

On opening of the new motorway, in late September 1977, there were over fifty offences of not keeping to new motorway regulations, such as riding bicycles and mopeds, but by November 1977 people were attempting to walk along the road, being often hitchhikers from the M6 junction.

Construction on Switch Island to junction 4 section began in 1978 with the road opening between April and September 1980.

A £12.1 million contract was given to Alfred McAlpine of Wirral, from Aintree to the Lancashire boundary, being 3.7 miles (6.0 km). A £9.6 million contract was given to Fairclough Civil Engineering, in early March 1978, from the Lancashire boundary to the A5068 at Skelmersdale, now junction 4, being 4.3 miles (6.9 km); it included a short section of widening of the Regional Road. Construction started in mid-April 1978. The section from the A5068, junction 4 at Skelmersdale, to A570, junction 3 at Bickerstaffe, opened on 1 June 1980. The last section was planned to open on 22 August 1980, but opened on 21 September, being 6.5 miles (10.5 km). It was six months late. The western mile-long section, from Aintree, was only two lanes, but had a wide central reservation, to allow a possible upgrade to three lanes.

=== Unfulfilled plans ===
Junction 2 was not built, and was the end of a proposed motorway to Preston. This was originally given the designation A59(M) as an upgrade to the A59 and later referred to as the M59. However these proposals were dropped in favour of improvements to the existing A59.

At Switch Island, the junction has been built to allow an extension of the M57 and the end of M58 has provision for slip roads to the extension to be constructed.

Lancashire County Council had in 1949 also proposed a Wigan to Bolton road. Bridges had been built on the M61 to allow for this eventual continuation. Later plans saw the road downgraded to an A road; it would have reached the M61 between junctions 5 and 6. These plans have also been dropped and currently Wigan Borough Council has plans for a part dual and part single carriageway route to the A579 near Atherton.

== Junctions ==
M58 motorway junctions
Ceremonial county	Location	mi	km	Junction	Destinations	Notes
Merseyside	Liverpool	0	0	M57 J7 (Note: 53.4929°N 2.9532°W)	M57 – Kirkby, Widnes A59 – Southport, Ormskirk A5036 – Bootle A5758 – Southport, Formby	
Merseyside	—	2.2	3.6	1 (Note: 53.5135°N 2.9073°W)	A506 – Kirkby, Maghull	
Lancashire	—	6.0	9.6	3 (Note: 53.5365°N 2.8272°W)	A570 – St Helens, Ormskirk, Southport	
Lancashire	Skelmersdale	7.7	12.3	4 (Note: 53.5406°N 2.7892°W)	A5068 – Skelmersdale	
Lancashire	Skelmersdale	9.4	15.1	5 (Note: 53.5329°N 2.7493°W)	A577 – Skelmersdale, Pimbo, Upholland	
Greater Manchester	Wigan	11.6	18.7	6 (Note: 53.5346°N 2.6978°W)	M6 – Preston, The South, Manchester, Birmingham A577 – Wigan	
1.000 mi = 1.609 km; 1.000 km = 0.621 mi

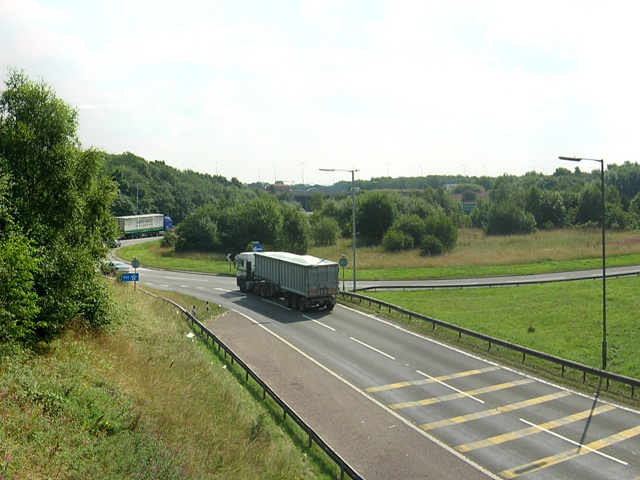
Approaching the M6 interchange from the M58

Coordinate list

== See also ==
- List of motorways in the United Kingdom
