= A565 road =

Road in England

A565

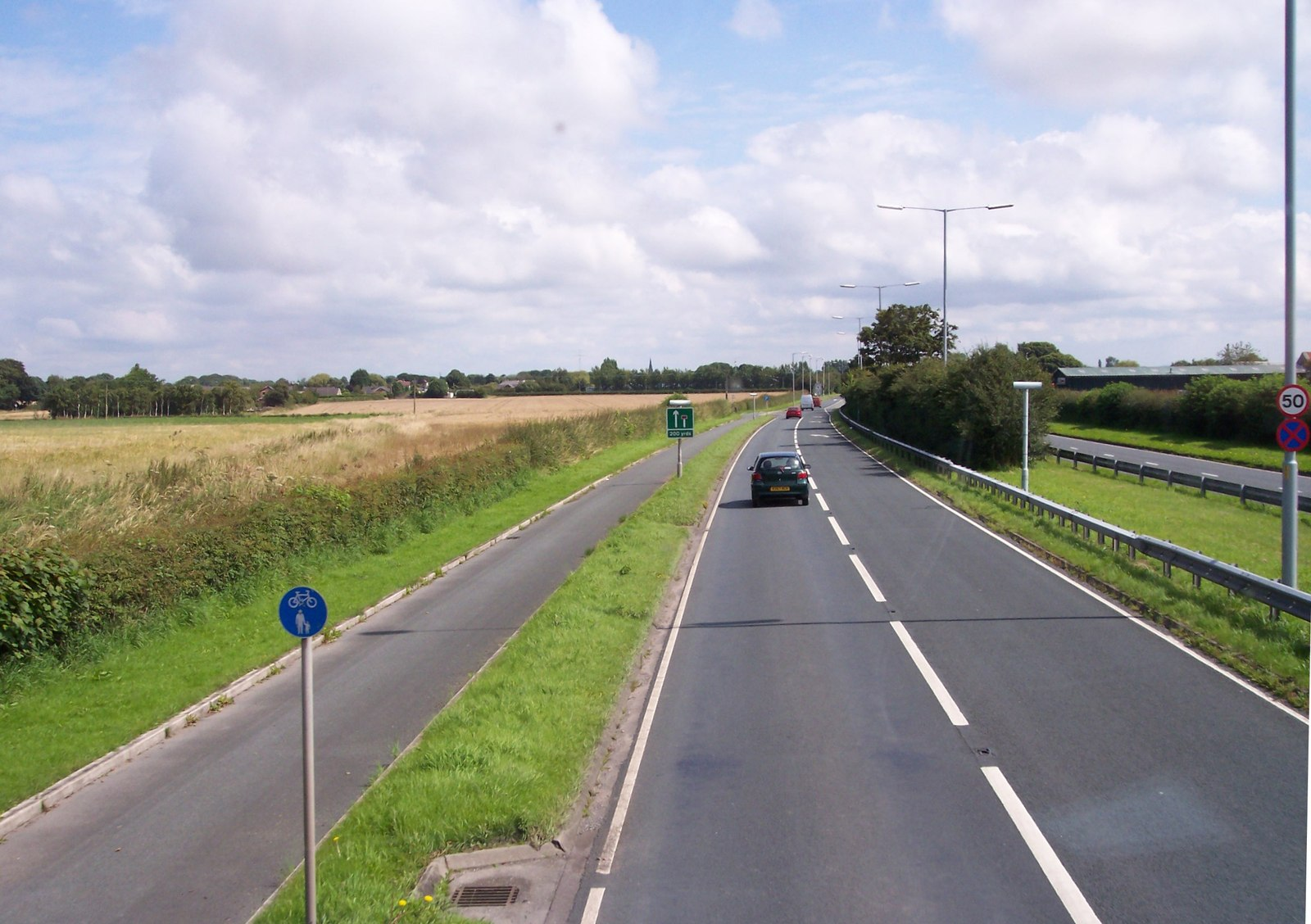
- Southport New Road at Mere Brow, near Tarleton

Route information
- Length: 27.5 mi (44.3 km)

Major junctions
- From: Liverpool; 53.411990°N 2.996526°W
- A57 A5046 A5052 A5053 A5054 A5055 A5056 A5058 A5057 A5098 A566 A5036 A5758 A5267 A570 A5267; A59
- To: Tarleton; 53.673496°N 2.831321°W

Location
- Country: United Kingdom
- Primary destinations: Liverpool; Bootle; Southport

Road network
- Roads in the United Kingdom; Motorways; A and B road zones

The A565 is a road in England that is around 27.5 miles (44.3 km) long and runs from Liverpool in Merseyside to Tarleton in Lancashire. It is a primary route linking the town of Southport to Liverpool and to Preston (latterly via the connecting A59), having been designated a trunk road as part of the Trunk Roads Act 1946.

== Route ==
The A565 starts in Liverpool at the junction with the A5052 road and A5053 road respectively, at the south end of Great Howard Street; a spur also heads southbound from this junction for 0.3 miles (0.48 km). From Liverpool, the road follows a north-bound alignment through Bootle, Crosby and on to Formby where it passes along a bypass. After the bypass, the road heads towards Southport where it meets the A570 Scarisbrick New Road before continuing north-east through Banks and into Lancashire, ultimately reaching Tarleton where it meets and becomes the A59 road.

== History ==
=== 19th century ===
Much of the present day A565 route from Liverpool to Thornton is unchanged since the Victorian age.

=== 20th century ===
A bypass of Formby, now forming part of the A565 was constructed during 1936–1937 at a cost of £195,463 (equivalent to £11,512,103 in 2025). It was opened on 10 December 1938 by Lord Derby, with the ceremony taking place at the Southport end of the road. At a width of 120 feet (37 m) and length of 4 miles (6.4 km), it shortened the route by nearly 0.75 miles (1.21 km). The Ministry of Transport provided a grant of 60% towards the construction cost.

The A565 route was included in the Trunk Roads Act 1946, designated in its route from Bootle through to Tarleton.

=== 21st century ===
A bypass of Thornton, Merseyside, known as the A5758 Broom's Cross Road, was constructed during 2014–2015, linking the A565 at Thornton with Switch Island junction, having been planned since the 1960s.

Liverpool City Council announced in 2016 that they had appointed a construction company to create a new dual-carriageway road in Liverpool, involving the widening of Great Howard Street and Derby Road, a 1.7 miles (2.7 km) stretch, at an expected cost of £18million, which had risen to £22million by the time the work started in May 2017. The council deemed the works necessary given the road would be a vital route for freight traffic to and from the Liverpool2 deep water container terminal, in addition to an associated tunnel and bridge which required replacement, having failed a structural assessment.

== Bypass schemes ==
Section	Start	End	Constructed	Type
Formby Bypass	Formby		1936–1937	Dual-carriageway
Southport Bypass	Southport		Proposed 1940s	Not constructed
Crosby (centre) Bypass	Crosby		c1951-1952	Single-carriageway
