= A5036 road =

Road in Merseyside, England

Coordinates: 53.47842°N 2.97525°W

A5036

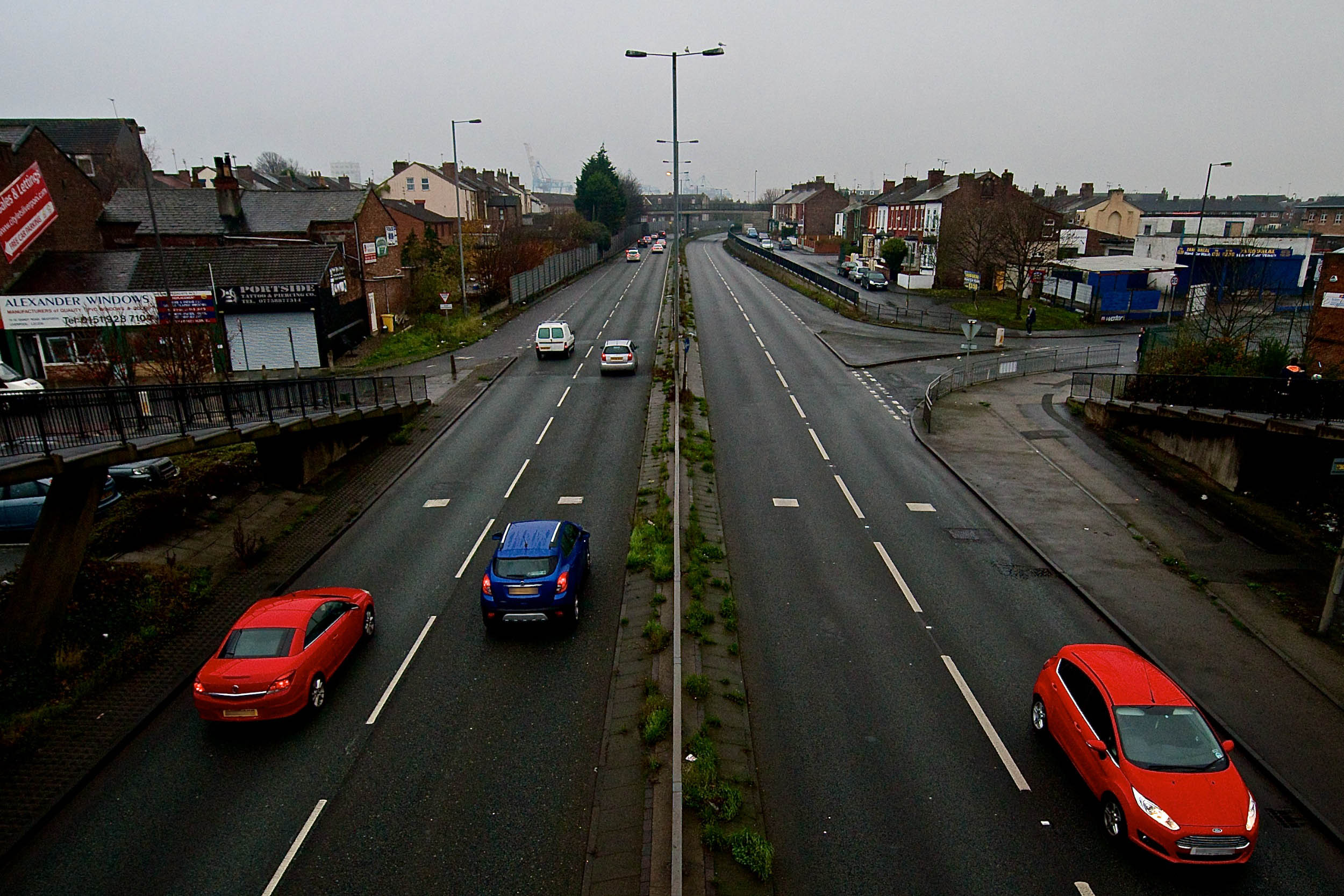
- Northern section looking south-west towards the docks

Route information
- Length: 8.0 mi (12.9 km)

Northern section
- North-east end: Switch Island, Netherton
- M57 M58; A59 A5207 A5038 A5090 A567 A565
- South-west end: Royal Seaforth Dock

Southern section
- Length: 4.6 mi (7.4 km)
- North end: Regent Road, Bootle
- Major intersections: A5058 A5052 A5046; A57 A5039 A5040 A562
- South end: Brunswick railway station

Location
- Country: United Kingdom

Road network
- Roads in the United Kingdom; Motorways; A and B road zones

The A5036 is a road in Merseyside, England, which comprises two sections separated by a gap of around 1.6 miles (2.6 km).

== Route ==
The northern section (shown right) is a 3.4-mile (5.5 km) section of trunk road. Starting at the Switch Island junction in Netherton, it heads south-west almost in a straight line towards the docks at Seaforth. For the first 4 junctions (up to the A5038 Netherton Way junction) it is known as Dunnings Bridge Road. The section between the A5038 and the large roundabout at Litherland is called Church Road, and the section between the roundabout and the docks (shown right), which was built later, is called Princess Way.

The southern section of the A5036 route heads south from Bootle docks, one block west of the A565 where it is first called Regent Road, then Waterloo Road, then Bath Street. It then regains primary dual carriageway status at its junction with the A5052 King Edward Street, near Princes Dock. The next 1.2 miles form the main route for north–south traffic along the waterfront of central Liverpool, which is known first as New Quay, then George's Dock Gates, Goree, The Strand, Strand Street, Wapping, and Chaloner Street before the main route turns to the east to become the A562 Parliament Street near Wapping Dock. The A5036 continues south as Sefton Street to Brunswick railway station in Dingle.

A former part of the A5036 between Bootle and Seaforth is now part of the internal roadway system of the docks, accounting for part of the gap between the two sections of route.

== History ==
The stretch between Church Road and Switch Island was constructed during the late 1930s at an estimated cost of £129,729 (equivalent to £10,573,534 in 2023).

== Traffic and improvements ==
The northern section is an important route for road freight between the docks and the motorway network. It is a dual carriageway throughout, and in 2011 was "one of the busiest roads in Europe". In 2014 it had an annual average daily flow (AADF) of 39,309 vehicles, 3,425 of which were HGVs.
In March 2015, improvement works were completed on the roundabout at Litherland to reduce congestion by separating through trunk road traffic from local traffic, at a cost of £3.4m.
