= Aintree =

Coordinates: 53.4793°N 2.9373°W

- Village
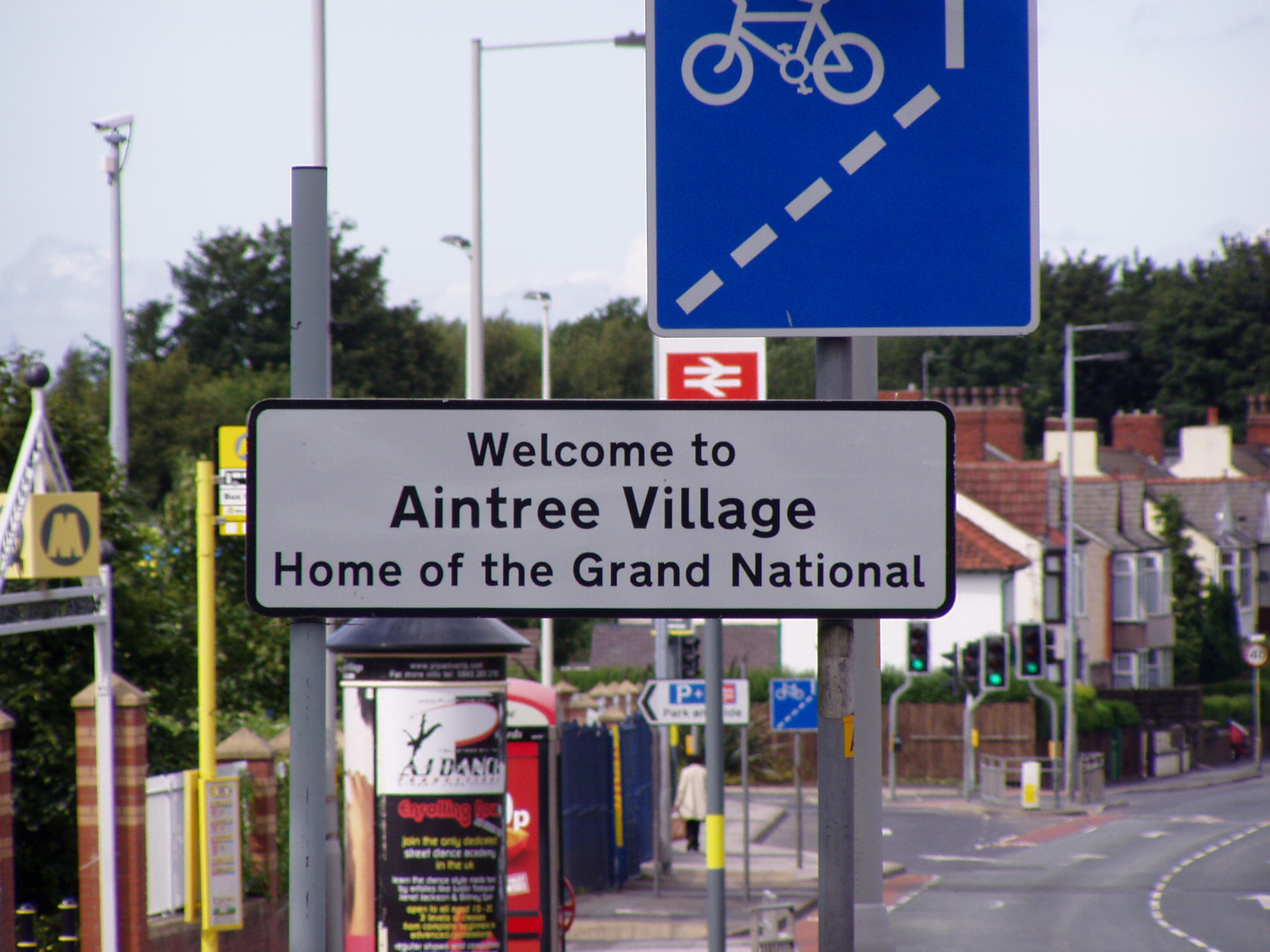
- Sign marking boundary of Aintree and the Liverpool district of Walton

- Location within Merseyside
- Population: 6,689 (2011)
- OS grid reference: SJ375985
- Civil parish: Aintree Village
- Metropolitan borough: Sefton
- Metropolitan county: Merseyside
- Region: North West
- Country: England
- Sovereign state: United Kingdom
- Post town: LIVERPOOL
- Postcode district: L9, L10
- Dialling code: 0151
- Police: Merseyside
- Fire: Merseyside
- Ambulance: North West
- UK Parliament: Sefton Central

Aintree is a village and civil parish in the Metropolitan Borough of Sefton, Merseyside, England. Historically in Lancashire, it lies between Walton and Maghull on the A59 road, it is considered a suburb of Liverpool and is located 6 miles (10 kilometres) northeast of Liverpool city centre. In 2011 the parish had a population of 6,689.

It is best known as the site of Aintree Racecourse, which since the 19th century has staged the Grand National horserace. In the 1950s and 1960s, there was also a three-mile-long international Grand Prix motor racing circuit on the site, which used the same grandstands as the horserace. A shorter form of the racing circuit is still used for various motorsport events.

The northern terminus of the Aintree district is commonly referred to by local people as "Old Roan".

== History ==
The name Aintree, thought to be of Saxon origin, means "one tree" or "tree standing alone". It is first recorded in 1226, also as Ayntre (the usual mediaeval spelling) in 1292. Eyntre occurs; Ayntree and Ayntrie, 16th century. Local legend held that an oak tree on Bull Bridge Lane (removed in 2004) was "the Ain tree" though the antiquity of the name excludes the possibility.

The historic core of the village was a small linear settlement near the junction of School Lane, Bull Bridge Lane and Wango Lane. Much of the nearby flat, wet and boggy land was reclaimed for agriculture following the Alt Drainage Act 1779 (19 Geo. 3. c. 33).

== Today ==
The village itself has two primary schools, Aintree Davenhill and Holy Rosary; five churches, St. Giles (Anglican), Holy Rosary (Roman Catholic), Old Roan Methodist Church, Old Roan Baptist Church (which met in Davenhill Primary School until recently and now meets at the former site of Holy Rosary Infants School) and Aintree Village Family Church (a Baptist church, meeting at Old Roan Methodist Church Hall, Altway); two small local shopping areas (on Altway and at the Old Roan); and three public houses, the Blue Anchor (which backs onto the Leeds and Liverpool Canal), The Valentine, named after a fence on the racecourse, and the Old Roan (now closed), which gives its name to a railway station in the village. The village also had a public library (now closed). A retail park along Ormskirk Road on former industrial land has brought a significant number of major out-of-town shops to the area.

Aintree Davenhill Primary School has a large field with a metal building that was built in the 1950s (since been rebuilt). The building was going to be a hospital building, but was turned into a school. The classrooms were along corridors that were originally going to be hospital wards.

Holy Rosary Primary School was a split-site school until 2008 with an approximate 1/2 mile (800 metres) between the schools. The reception and infant classes were based at a site at the Old Roan end of the village between Altway and Aintree Lane, and the junior classes based at the Valentine end of the village in the Oriel Drive site. After substantial building work to extend the Oriel Drive school, the Aintree Lane/Altway site was closed as a school at the beginning of the 2008–09 academic year, was taken over by Old Roan Baptist Church and is now called the Hope Centre, providing various services for the local community. The school has a large field used for events such as their sports day and an all-weather sports pitch. The original building was built in the 1970s and 1980s.

== Transport ==
The main road from Liverpool to Aintree is the A59 (known as Ormskirk Road as it passes through Aintree) - with the road passing through Aintree's retail parks. The M57, M58, A59, and A5036 meet at a complex junction called Switch Island, between Aintree and Maghull.

Although Aintree railway station is convenient for the racecourse, the village itself is closer to Old Roan railway station. Both are on the Merseyrail Northern Line's Ormskirk branch, with regular service between Liverpool Central and Ormskirk. In the past, it was also served by Aintree Central railway station on the North Liverpool Extension Line, located behind Aintree railway station. The North Mersey Branch also ran through, close to the station, and had Aintree Racecourse railway station.

Bus services are regular: a bus every 20 minutes to Liverpool runs through the village, while various other routes to Liverpool and destinations to the north and south—including Maghull, Ormskirk, Aintree Hospital, and Southport—stop near the Old Roan.

The Leeds and Liverpool Canal runs through the village.

== Notable residents ==
- Andy Burnham, Prime Minister of the United Kingdom, Labour Party MP (2001-2017, 2026-), Mayor of Greater Manchester from 2017 to 2026, was born in Old Roan in Aintree in 1970.
- Tom Cannon, footballer for Sheffield United and the Republic of Ireland.
- Richard Crawshaw, Baron Crawshaw of Aintree OBE, known as Dick Crawshaw, lived for most of his life on Aintree Lane.
- Ted Sagar, the former Everton goalkeeper, ran a pub in Aintree after retiring as a player in 1952.
- Ronald Sugden (1896–1971), first-class cricketer and Royal Air Force officer
- Phil Thompson, former Liverpool captain and now Sky Sports pundit, lived on Bull Bridge Lane.

== See also ==
- Listed buildings in Aintree Village
