= A562 road =

Road in northwest England

Coordinates: 53.35675°N 2.82947°W

A562

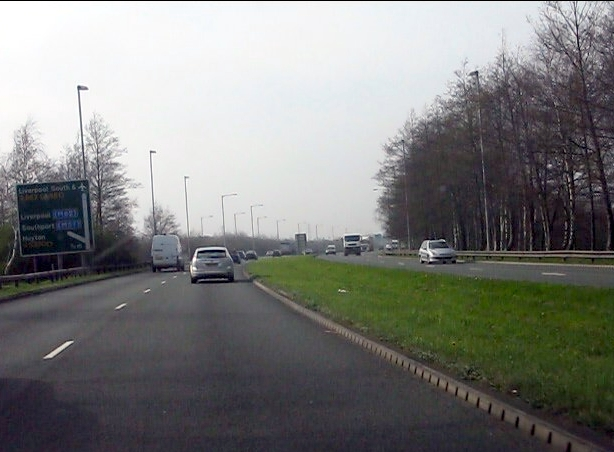
- A562 at Hale Road Woods

Major junctions
- West end: Liverpool
- A5036 A5037 A561 A5039 A5048 A5058 A5275 A561 A5300 A533 A557 A5080; A57
- East end: Warrington

Location
- Country: United Kingdom
- Primary destinations: Liverpool; Speke; Widnes; Warrington

Road network
- Roads in the United Kingdom; Motorways; A and B road zones

The A562 is a road in England which runs from Liverpool to Warrington.

== Route ==
=== Parliament Street ===
At Liverpool, the road is known at first as Parliament Street.

=== Upper Parliament Street to Speke Boulevard ===
It then becomes Upper Parliament Street, Smithdown Road, Allerton Road, Menlove Avenue, Hillfoot Road, Hillfoot Avenue and Higher Road, before joining Speke Boulevard.

=== Penketh ===
It ends in Penketh, Warrington.
