= A570 road =

Road in England

Coordinates: 53.51066°N 2.8022°W

A570

Major junctions
- South end: M62 Junction 7
- A57 A557 M62; A58 A580 A506 M58; A59 A5267 A565
- North end: Southport (Lord Street)

Location
- Country: United Kingdom

Road network
- Roads in the United Kingdom; Motorways; A and B road zones

The A570 is a road in north-west England. A 1994 statutory instrument refers to it as the "A570 St. Helens-Ormskirk-Southport Trunk Road". In St Helens, the A570 St Helens Linkway connects St Helens town centre to the M62 motorway and provides key north–south movement within the borough.

The A570 is a primary route in Northern England, that runs from St Helens to Southport.

== Route ==
Until the early 1970s, the road ran from a junction with the A57 road at Bold Heath, four miles west of Warrington. The road currently begins at junction 7 (Rainhill Stoops) of the M62 motorway in Merseyside, and runs in a northerly direction as a dual carriageway through the centre of St Helens, meeting the A58 road, then the A580 road to the north of the town. The road continues in a north-westerly direction, bypassing Rainford to dual carriageway standard. It crosses the border into Lancashire, before reaching junction 3 of the M58 motorway. Continuing north-westerly still, as a single carriageway road it travels through Ormskirk, meeting the A59 road at a crossroads. North-west of Ormskirk, it crosses over the Leeds and Liverpool Canal, and meets the A5147 road near Scarisbrick. Shortly afterwards, it crosses the border back into Merseyside, and reaches the town of Southport. It terminates at its junction with the A565 road in the centre of the town.
