= Angeletti =

Angeletti may refer to:

- Luigi Angeletti, Italian trade unionist and syndicalist
- Marco Angeletti, Italian footballer
- Pietro Angeletti, Italian painter in a Neoclassical style
- Sergio Angeletti, Italian cartoonist
- Crassispira angeletti, species of sea snail, a marine gastropod mollusk in the family of Turridae, the turrids
