= Virginia Benzi =

Italian YouTuber (born 1996)

- Born: Virginia Chiara Benzi; September 6, 1996 (age 30); Acqui Terme, Piedmont, Italy
- Education: University of Genoa (M.Sc., 2023)
- Occupations: YouTuber; Science communicator
- Known for: Science communication and promoting STEM education among women

Virginia Benzi (born 6 September 1996) known online as Quantum Girl is an Italian YouTuber and physics popularizer.

== Biography ==
A native of Acqui Terme, Piedmont, she attended a liceo artistico and enrolled in an academy of Fine Arts before pursuing a master's degree in Fundamental interaction, which she obtained in 2023 at the University of Genoa.

Her YouTube channel deals with science, technology, engineering, and mathematics She revealed that her goal was to draw girls closer to STEM subjects, a field, she says, that is dominated by men. Having started YouTubing as a pastime, this activity ended up being a full-time job. In 2024, she took part in a project with the Presidency of the Italian Republic to realize a video promoting the development of scientific research; she also met President Sergio Mattarella at the Quirinale. She was reached out to by Italian state-television Rai for a physics divulgation program called Generazione Q, aired on Rai Play. She became ambassador of the Generazione STEM project.

In 2024, she was included by Forbes Italia in the list of the best 100 under-30 personalities of the year. In the same year, she won the TikTok award as the best Italian Education creator of the year 2024.
