= Liceo Artistico Ripetta =

Art school in Rome, Italy

Liceo artistico statale "Via di Ripetta"
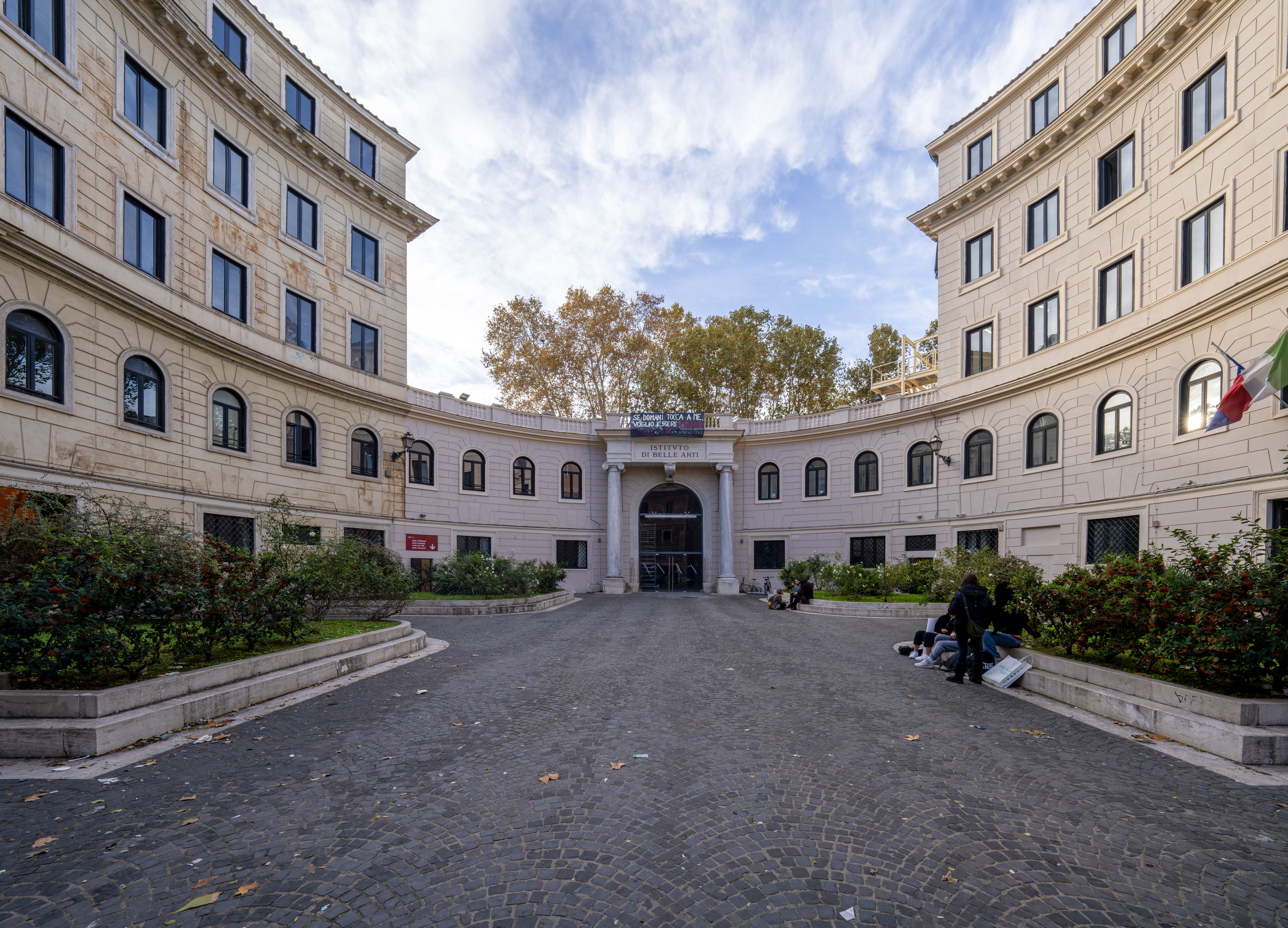

Location
- Via di Ripetta 218 (branch office: Viale Pinturicchio 71); Rome; Italy
- Coordinates: 41.9070°N 12.4756°E

Information
- Type: Liceo artistico; Architecture & environment; Figurative arts; Design; Graphic design; Scenography
- Established: 1974

The Liceo artistico Ripetta in Rome is located in via di Ripetta, in the Rione Campo Marzio.

== History ==
The school has its roots in the 15th century, when Pope Sixtus IV granted the Oratory of St. Luke; in 1577, under Pope Gregory XIII, the Accademia Nazionale di San Luca, now Accademia di Belle Arti di Roma was founded.

In the following two centuries the seats multiplied, until in 1845 the Istituto delle Belle Arti was born under the papacy of Pope Gregory XVI; the aim was to gather the art students in one location.

The building intended to house the institute was the Palazzo Camerale in via di Ripetta, designed and built for this purpose by the architect Pietro Camporese the Younger. The palace is commonly referred as the "horseshoe", due to its hemicycle-shaped facade. After the capture of Rome, both the building and the institute came under the jurisdiction of the Italian state; in 1923 it became a liceo artistico, although not didactically autonomous as it was connected to the Accademia di Belle Arti di Roma; the autonomy came in 1974.
