= Accademia di San Luca =

Italian association of artists in Rome

Accademia Nazionale di San Luca
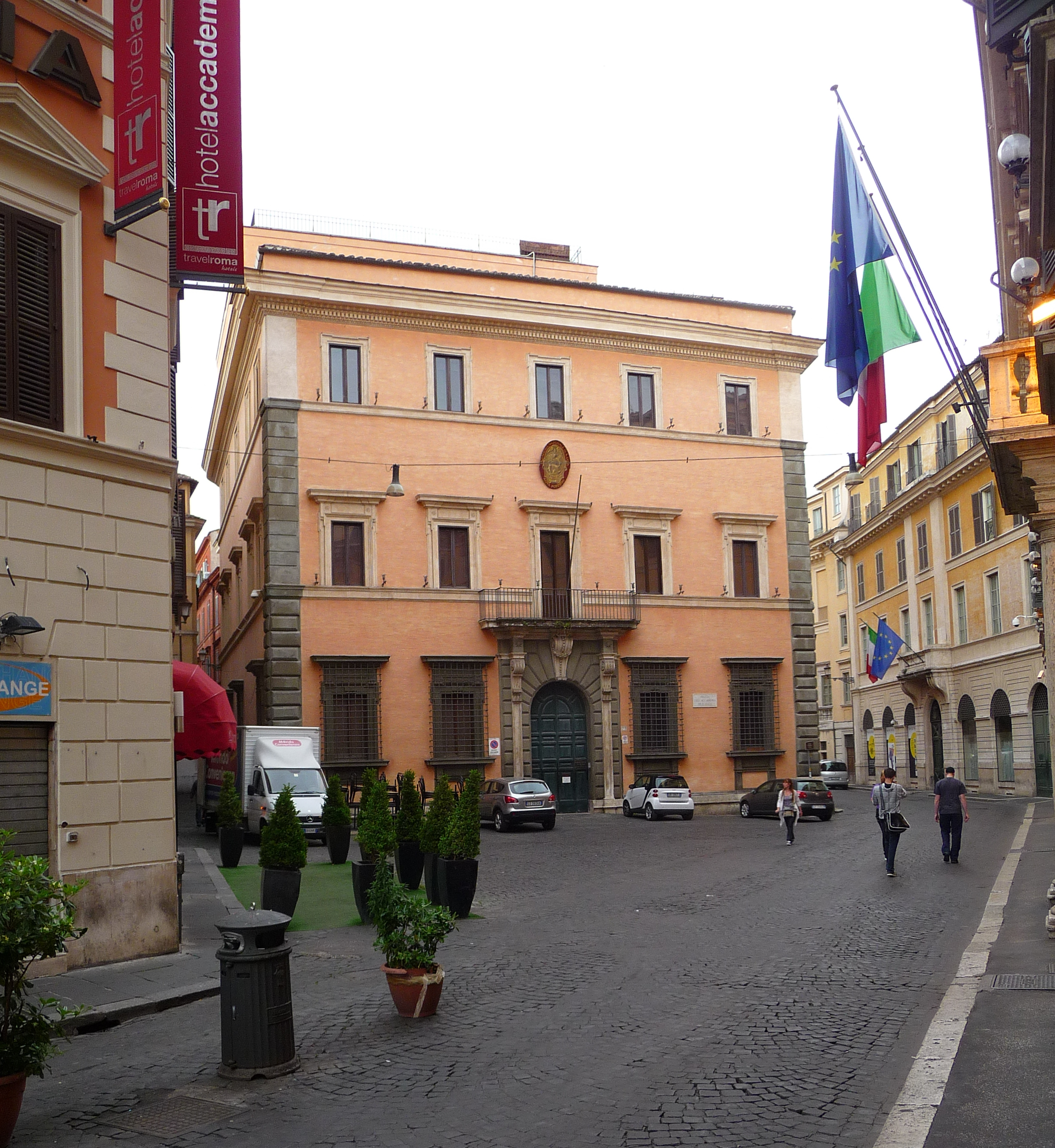
- Palazzo Carpegna, modern-day location for the Accademia Nazionale di San Luca
- Named after: Luke the Evangelist
- Predecessor: Compagnia di San Luca
- Formation: 1577
- Founder: Federico Zuccari
- Founded at: Rome
- Type: Association of artists
- Location: Piazza dell'Accademia di San Luca, 77
- Coordinates: 41°54′6″N 12°29′1″E
- President: Francesco Cellini
- Vice President: Tommaso Cascella
- Website: https://accademiasanluca.it/

The Accademia Nazionale di San Luca (English: National Academy of St. Luke) is an Italian academy of artists in Rome. The establishment of the Accademia de i Pittori e Scultori di Roma was approved by papal brief in 1577, and in 1593 Federico Zuccari became its first principe or director; the statutes were ratified in 1607. Other founders included Girolamo Muziano and Pietro Olivieri. The Academy was named for Luke the Evangelist, the patron saint of painters.

From the late sixteenth century until it moved to its present location at the Palazzo Carpegna, it was based in an urban block by the Roman Forum and although these buildings no longer survive, the Academy church of Santi Luca e Martina, does. Designed by the Baroque architect, Pietro da Cortona, its main façade overlooks the Forum.

== History ==
The Academy's predecessor was the Compagnia di San Luca, a guild of painters and miniaturists, which met in the demolished church of S. Luca all'Esquilino, near Santa Maria Maggiore, and whose statutes and privileges were renewed 17 December 1478 by Pope Sixtus IV. Among the founding members was the famous painter Melozzo da Forlì, as he was the pictor papalis.

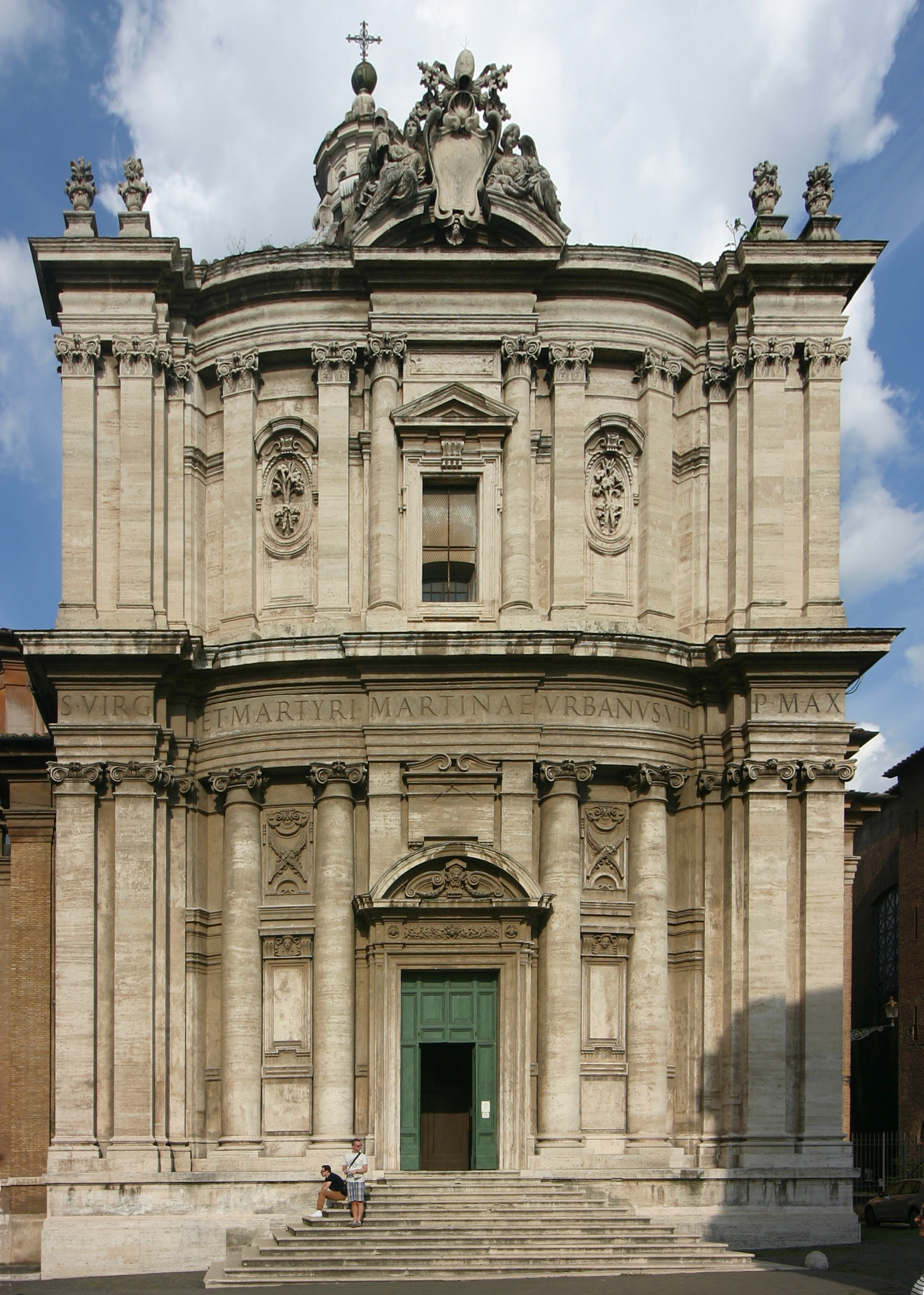
Santi Luca e Martina

Through the initiative of Girolamo Muziano, who was both one of the leading artists in Rome and superintendent of works for Pope Gregory XIII, the Pope granted the Academy official recognition in 1577. In 1588 Pope Sixtus V gave the institution the ancient church of S. Martina, which was rededicated as Santi Luca e Martina.

In 1605, Pope Paul V granted the Academy the right to pardon a condemned man on the feast of St. Luke. As early as 1607, members were encouraged to increase their donations to the library. In the 1620s, Urban VIII extended its rights to decide who was considered an artist in Rome, and in 1627 it came under the patronage of his nephew, Cardinal Francesco Barberini. Like many academies it was traditional to submit a self-portrait – the collection serving as a record of the institution's illustrious membership. In 1633, Urban VIII gave it the right to tax all artists as well as art-dealers, and monopolize all public commissions. These latter measures raised strong opposition and apparently were poorly enforced.

At some after 1634, during the time when Pietro da Cortona was principe, the accademia began to admit architects, who enjoyed the same status as painters and sculptors. The Academy offered courses in painting, sculpture and architecture. Competitions open to artists and architects of all nationalities under 25 years old, the Concorsi Clementini, were held annually until 1721, when they became triennial. In 1763 these were supplemented by the Concorsi Balestra, and thereafter the two competitions alternated biennially.

In 1845, the Academy expanded to the Palazzo Camerale on the Via di Ripetta in order to have the art students in one location. This later became the Liceo Artistico Ripetta.

=== The Cortona-Sacchi Debate and other artistic issues ===
Artistic issues debated within the Academy included the Cortona-Sacchi controversy (see Andrea Sacchi for further details of this debate) about the number of figures in a painting. Disdain was expressed by many academicians for the Bamboccianti.

Giovanni Bellori gave famous lectures on painting in the Academy. In the early 18th century, the painter Marco Benefial was inducted, and then expelled for criticizing the academy as an insider.

=== Recent times ===
Due to the construction of Via dell'Impero, the academy's historic headquarters on Via Bonella was demolished and in 1934 the institution moved to Palazzo Carpegna.

The Academy is still active; the Accademia Nazionale di San Luca is its modern descendant. From the very beginning, the statutes of the Academy directed that each candidate-academician was to donate a work of his art in perpetual memory and, later, a portrait. Thus the Academy, in its current premises in the 16th-century Palazzo Carpegna, located in the Piazza dell'Accademia di San Luca, has accumulated a unique collection of paintings and sculptures, including about 500 portraits, as well as an outstanding collection of drawings. The Academy also hosts exhibitions of the works of various artists.

The Library of the National Academy of San Luca houses the Academic Library and the Sarti Roman Municipal Library, which together hold over 50,000 volumes regarding painting, sculpture and architecture. Scholarships are periodically announced for research activities in academic archives or abroad.

== Notable people ==
=== Faculty ===
- Pietro Angeletti, painter in a Neoclassical style

=== Principi ===
Prominent artists to become Principe of the academy over the first 200 years include:

- Federico Zuccari, 1593
- Tommaso Laureti, 1595
- Giovanni De Vecchi, 1596
- Cesare Nebbia, 1597
- Durante Alberti, 1598
- Flaminio Vacca, 1599
- Cavalier d'Arpino, 1600, 1616, 1629
- Girolamo Massei, 1603
- Pietro Bernini, 1605, 1606
- Paolo Guidotti, 1607, 1620
- Gaspare Celio, 1609
- Cherubino Alberti, 1611–1613
- Ottavio Leoni, 1614–1615, 1627
- Giovanni Baglione, 1617–1619
- Gian Lorenzo Bernini, 1621, 1630
- Agostino Ciampelli, 1623
- Antiveduto Gramatica, 1624
- Virginia Vezzi, 1624
- Simon Vouet, 1624–1627
- Baldassare Croce, 1628
- Domenichino, 1629
- Giovanni Lanfranco, 1631, 1632
- Francesco Mochi, 1633
- Pietro da Cortona, 1634–1636
- Alessandro Turchi, 1637, 1638
- Giovanni Francesco Romanelli, 1639
- Alessandro Algardi, 1640
- Girolamo Rainaldi, 1641–1643
- Niccolò Menghini, 1645–1647
- Giovanni Battista Soria, 1648–1650
- Luigi Gentile da Bruxelles, 1651–1653
- Pietro Martire Neri, 1654
- Bernardino Gagliardi, 1655–1658
- Nicolas Poussin, 1657 (resigned)
- Raffaello Vanni, 1658–1660
- Gaspare Morone, 1661
- Pier Francesco Mola, 1662, 1663
- Carlo Maratta, 1664–1665, 1699, 1706–1713
- Giovanni Francesco Grimaldi 1666
- Melchiorre Cafà, 1667 (declined)
- Orfeo Boselli, 1667
- Pietro del Pò
- Giacinto Brandi 1669, 1684
- Domenico Guidi, 1670, 1675
- Giovanni Maria Morandi, 1671, 1680, 1685
- Charles Errard, 1672, 1678
- Carlo Rainaldi, 1673
- Giovan Battista Gaulli, 1674
- Carlo Cesi, 1675
- Charles Le Brun, 1676–1677
- Lazzaro Baldi, 1679
- Mattia de Rossi, 1681, 1693
- Luigi Garzi, 1682
- Giovanni Battista Contini, 1683, 1719
- Filippo Lauri, 1686 (resigned)
- Carlo Fontana, 1686, 1694
- Ludovico Gimignani 1688
- Giovan Battista Boncori, 1698
- Charles-François Poerson, 1714, 1718
- Benedetto Luti, 1720
- Giuseppe Bartolomeo Chiari, 1723–1725
- Antonio Valeri, 1726
- Camillo Rusconi, 1727, 1728
- Sebastiano Conca, 1729, 1739
- Girolamo Teodoldi, 1734, 1742
- Agostino Masucci, 1736–1738
- Gaetano Lapis, 1741
- Jean-François de Troy, 1744
- Giovanni Battista Maini, 1746, 1747
- Tommaso de Marchis, 1748
- Francesco Mancini, 1750–1751
- Filippo della Valle, 1752, 1760–1761
- Ferdinando Fuga, 1753–1754
- Giovanni Paolo Pannini, 1755
- Pietro Bracci, 1756
- Clemente Orlandi, 1757
- Placido Costanzi, 1758
- Mauro Fontana, 1762
- Francisco Preciado de la Vega, 1764–1766, 1777–1778
- Andrea Bergondi, 1767, 1779–1780
- Anton Raphael Mengs, 1771–1772
- Carlo Marchionni, 1773
- Ferdinando Raggi, 1781
- Anton von Maron, 1784
- Agostino Penna, 1787–1789
- Antonio Asprucci, 1790
- Tommaso Conca, 1793
- Vincenzo Pacetti, 1796, 1800, 1801
- Andrea Vici, 1802
- Vincenzo Camuccini, 1806–1810
- Antonio Canova, 1811 (permanent principe 1814 to 1822)
- Gaspare Landi, 1817–1820
- Alessandro Massimiliano Laboureur, 1820–1822
- Girolamo Scaccia, 1823
- Matteo Pertsch, 1825
- Vincenzo Camuccini, 1826
- Bertel Thorvaldsen, 1827–1828
- Giulio Camporese, 1829
- Andrea Pozzi, 1830–1831
- Antonio D'Este, 1832
- Tommaso Minardi, 1837
- Clemente Folchi, 1841–1843
- Luigi Poletti, 1849–1853
- Filippo Agricola, 1854–1855
- Virginio Vespignani, 1870, 1876–1877
- Nicola Consoni, 1878, 1883
- Stefano Galletti, 1899, 1900

Claude Lorrain was a member but declined the offer of being Principe. Sofonisba Anguissola and Girolama Parasole, although not Principi, were both honored by the inclusion of their portraits in the Academy's portrait collection. The portraits are dated 1564 and 1612, respectively, though the accuracy and meaning of the dates is not fully clear, and they were the first two portraits of woman artists to be added to the Academy's collection. It is not known which portrait was added to the collection first: both were originally noted in an inventory that occurred in 1633. The Academy can also boast modern members, including sculptors Ernesto Biondi, Piccirilli Brothers, and architect Angelo Torricelli.
