= Pietro Angeletti =

Italian painter (active 1758–1786)

Pietro Angeletti (active, 1758–1786) was an Italian painter in a Neoclassical style.

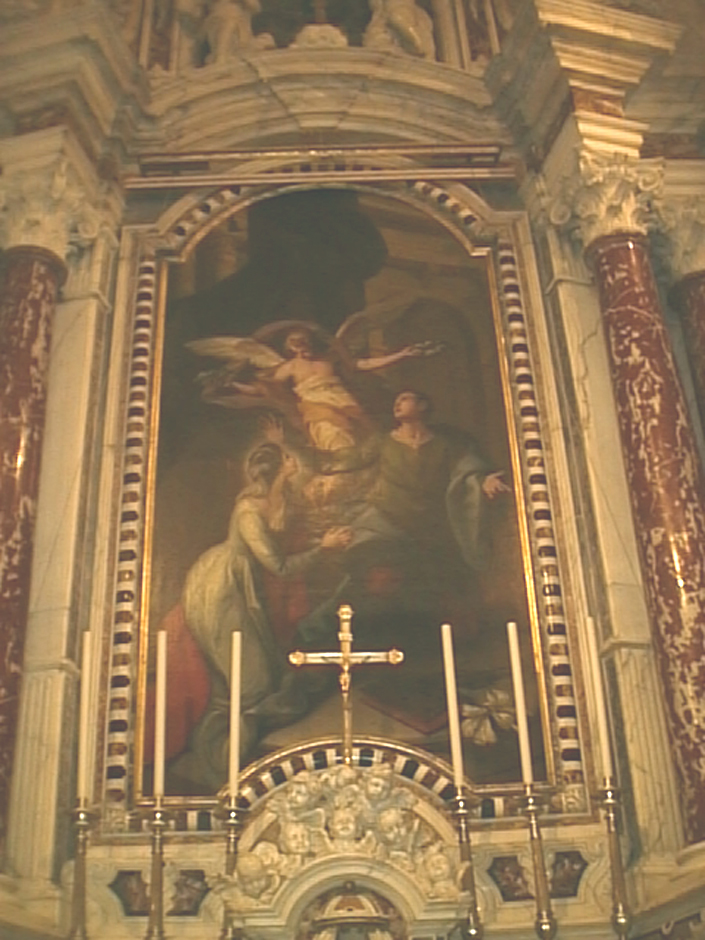
Pietro Angeletti, Marriage of Cecilia and Valerian, Cathedral of Cagliari

== Biography ==
Born and died in Rome, he was a professor of painting at the Accademia di San Luca. He painted the Reconciliation of Venus and Minerva for the ceiling of a room in Villa Borghese that houses the Bernini sculpture of Apollo and Daphne. For his work, he was paid 350 scudi. He painted two oval canvases depicting the Life of St Catherine of Siena for the church of Santa Caterina di Siena in Rome. He painted a Marriage of Cecilia and Valerian for the Cathedral of Cagliari. He also painted a portrait of the Archbishop of Fermo, Alessandro Borgia; and portraits of San Giuseppe da Copertino and of Alanus de Solminiac used by engravers.
