= Palazzo camerale (Rome) =

Palazzo Camerale
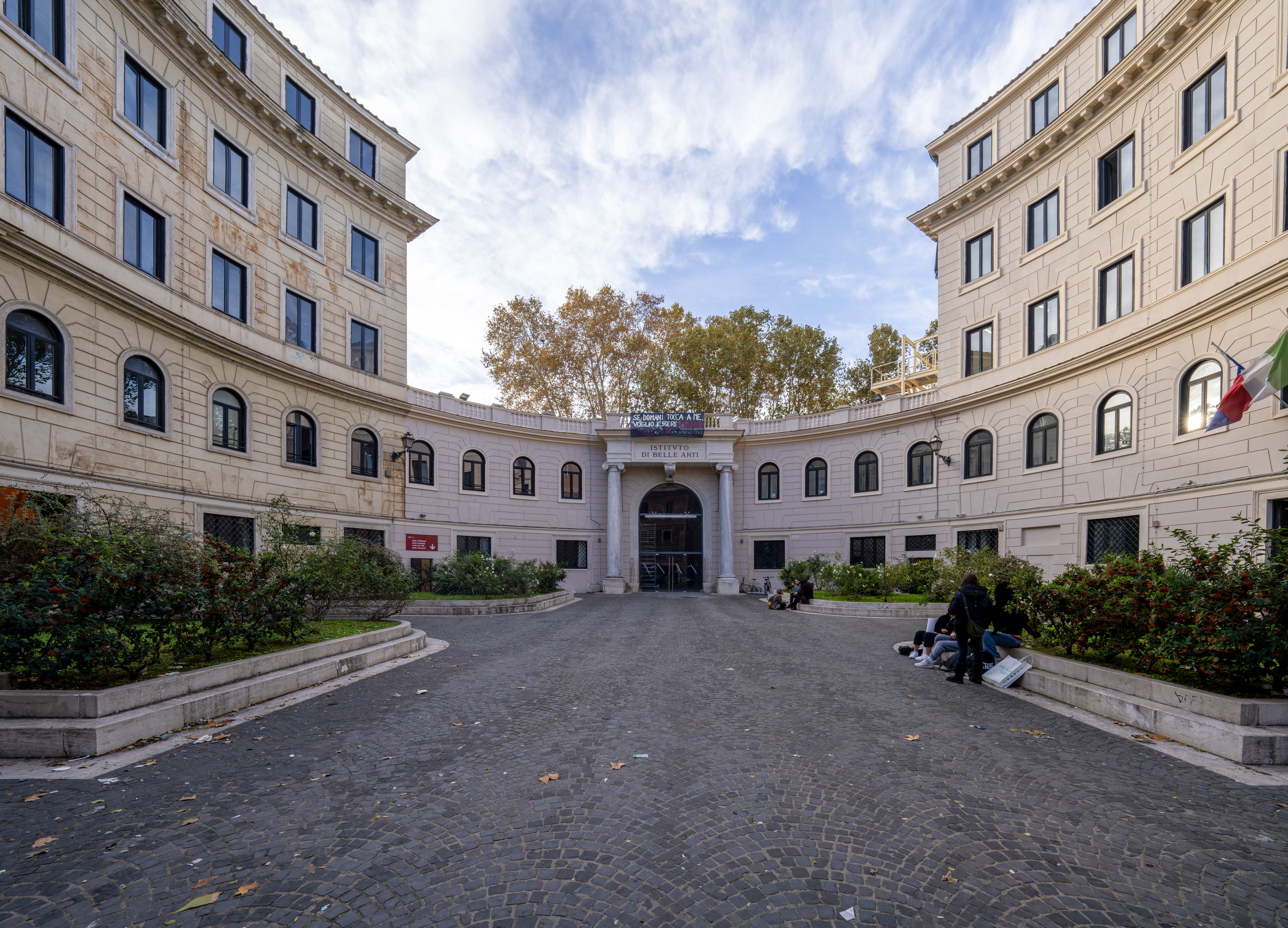
- The "horseshoe", hemicycle in Via di Ripetta
- Interactive map of the Palazzo Camerale area

General information
- Location: Rome, Italy
- Coordinates: 41.9075°N 12.4756°E
- Completed: 1845

Design and construction
- Architect: Pietro Camporese the Younger

Palazzo camerale is a neoclassic building of Rome, in Via di Ripetta 218, the seat of the Liceo Artistico Ripetta.

== History ==
The palace was designed and built in 1845 by order of the Apostolic Camera under Pope Gregory XVI as the new seat of the Accademia Nazionale di San Luca, since until that moment the lesson took place in various locations. The Accademia Nazionale di Santa Cecilia also moved in the same premises.

After the capture of Rome, the building passed to the Italian state, as well as the Accademia: the latter refused to recognize itself as a national institute; therefore, since 1872, the school housed here was called Regio Istituto delle Belle Arti ("Royal Institute of Fine Arts"). In 1923 the institute became the Liceo Artistico Ripetta, despite not being didactically autonomous as it was connected to the Accademia di Belle Arti di Roma. The autonomy finally came in 1974.

The neoclassic building is commonly referred as the "horseshoe", due to its hemicycle-shaped facade.

== Numismatics ==
- A pontifical medal, created by medalist and engraver Giuseppe Cerbara, commemorates the tenth anniversary of the foundation of the palace.

== Bibliography ==
- Cassese, Giovanna (2013). Accademie / Patrimoni di Belle Arti. Rome: Gangemi. ISBN 9788849226713.
