= Villa Borghese gardens =

Landscape garden in Rome, Italy

Villa Borghese
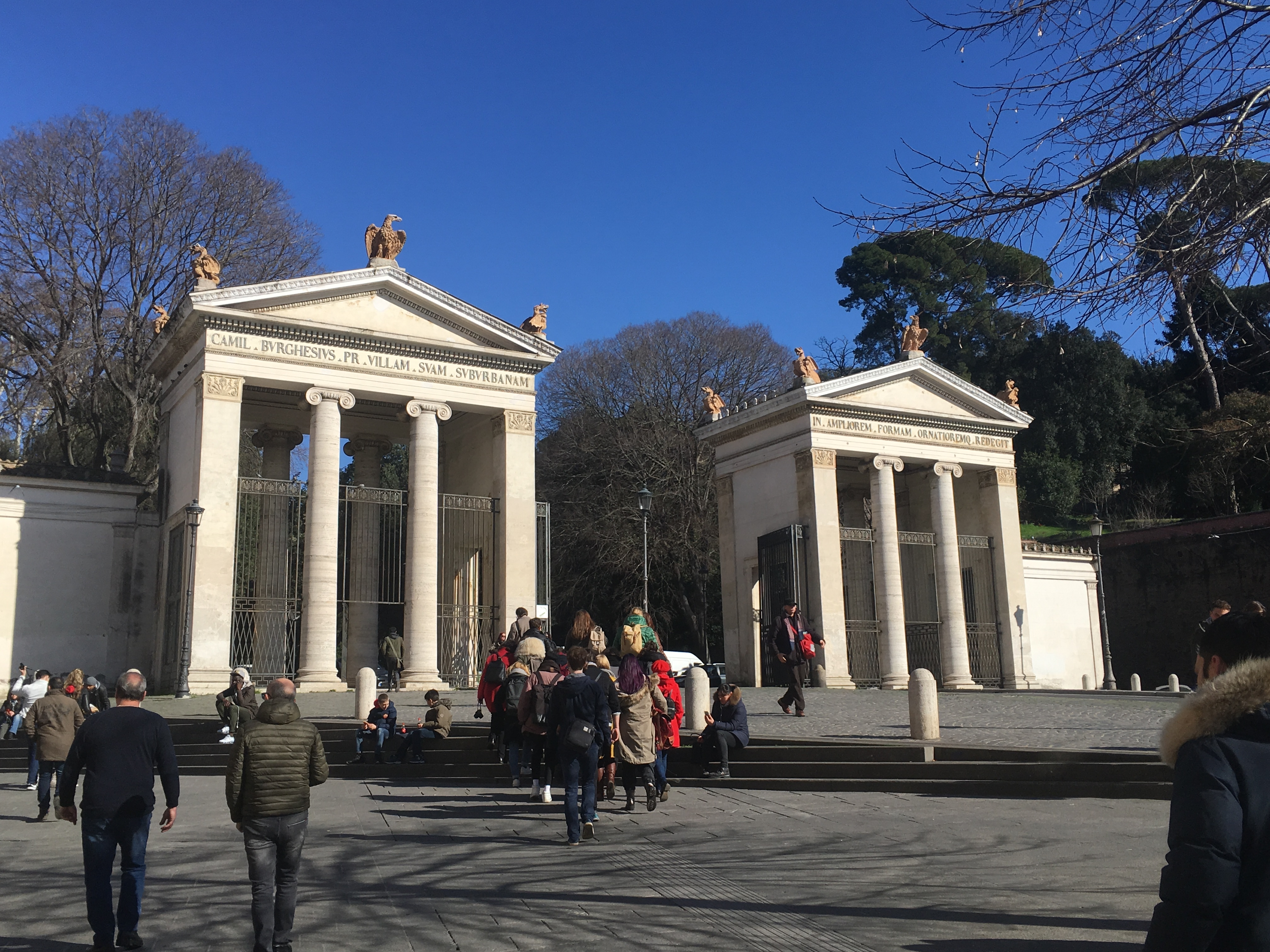
- Monumental entrance of Villa Borghese in Rome on the Piazzale Flaminio
- Click on the map for a fullscreen view
- Type: Public park
- Location: Town Hall II, Pinciano, Rome, Italy
- Coordinates: 41°54′51″N 12°29′32″E
- Area: 80 ha (200 acres)
- Created: 17th–20th century
- Operator: Municipality of Rome
- Website: sovraintendenzaroma.it

Villa Borghese is a landscape garden in Rome, containing a number of buildings, museums (see Galleria Borghese) and attractions. It is the third-largest public park in Rome (80 hectares or 197.7 acres), after the ones of the Villa Doria Pamphili and Villa Ada. The gardens were developed for the Villa Borghese Pinciana ("Borghese villa on the Pincian Hill"), built by the architect Flaminio Ponzio, developing sketches by Scipione Borghese, who used it as a villa suburbana, or party villa, at the edge of Rome, and to house his art collection. The gardens as they are now were remade in the late 19th century.

== History ==
In 1605 Cardinal Scipione Borghese, nephew of Pope Paul V and patron of Bernini, began turning this former vineyard into the most extensive gardens built in Rome since Antiquity. The vineyard's site is identified with the gardens of Lucullus, the most famous in the late Roman republic. Domenico Savino da Montepulciano was responsible for the layout of the gardens.

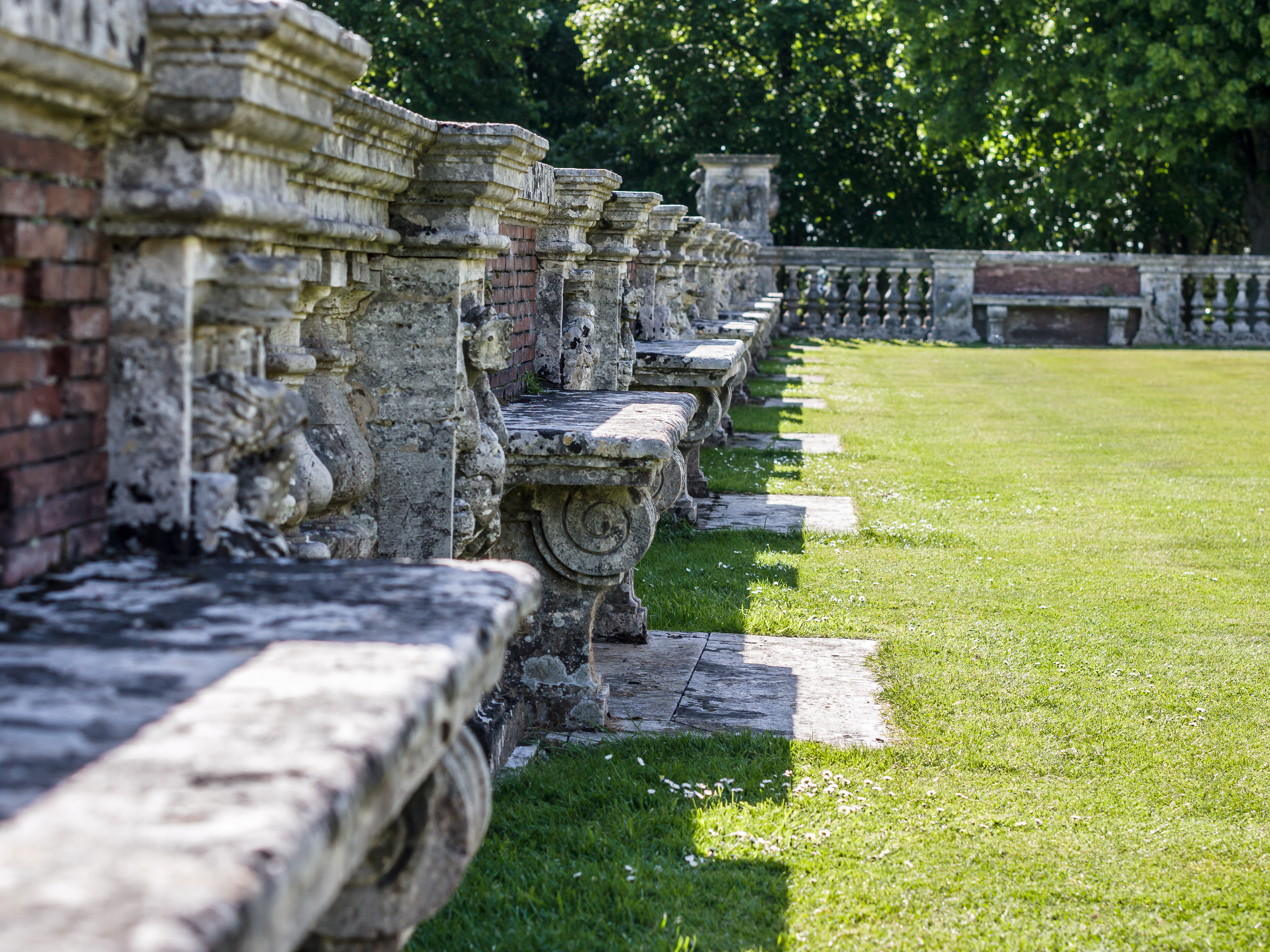
Stone benches, Borghese Balustrade

The Borghese Balustrade was crafted by G di Gincome and P. Massoni in 1618 for the south forecourt of the Casino Nobile. At the center opening there were two stone statues on top and fountains with shell-shaped basins below. The statues were a later addition from 1715 by Claude-Augustin Cayot. In 1882, President Chester A. Arthur appointed William Waldorf Astor Minister to Italy, a post he held until 1885. While living in Rome, Astor developed a lifelong passion for art and sculpture. In 1896, he purchased the balustrade and had it installed at his English estate Cliveden. It is a Grade II Listed Building. In 2004, a colony of small Mediterranean land snails of the species Papillifera bidens was discovered living on the Borghese Balustrade. Presumably, this species, new to the English fauna, was accidentally imported along with the balustrade in the late 19th century and managed to survive the intervening winters to the present day.

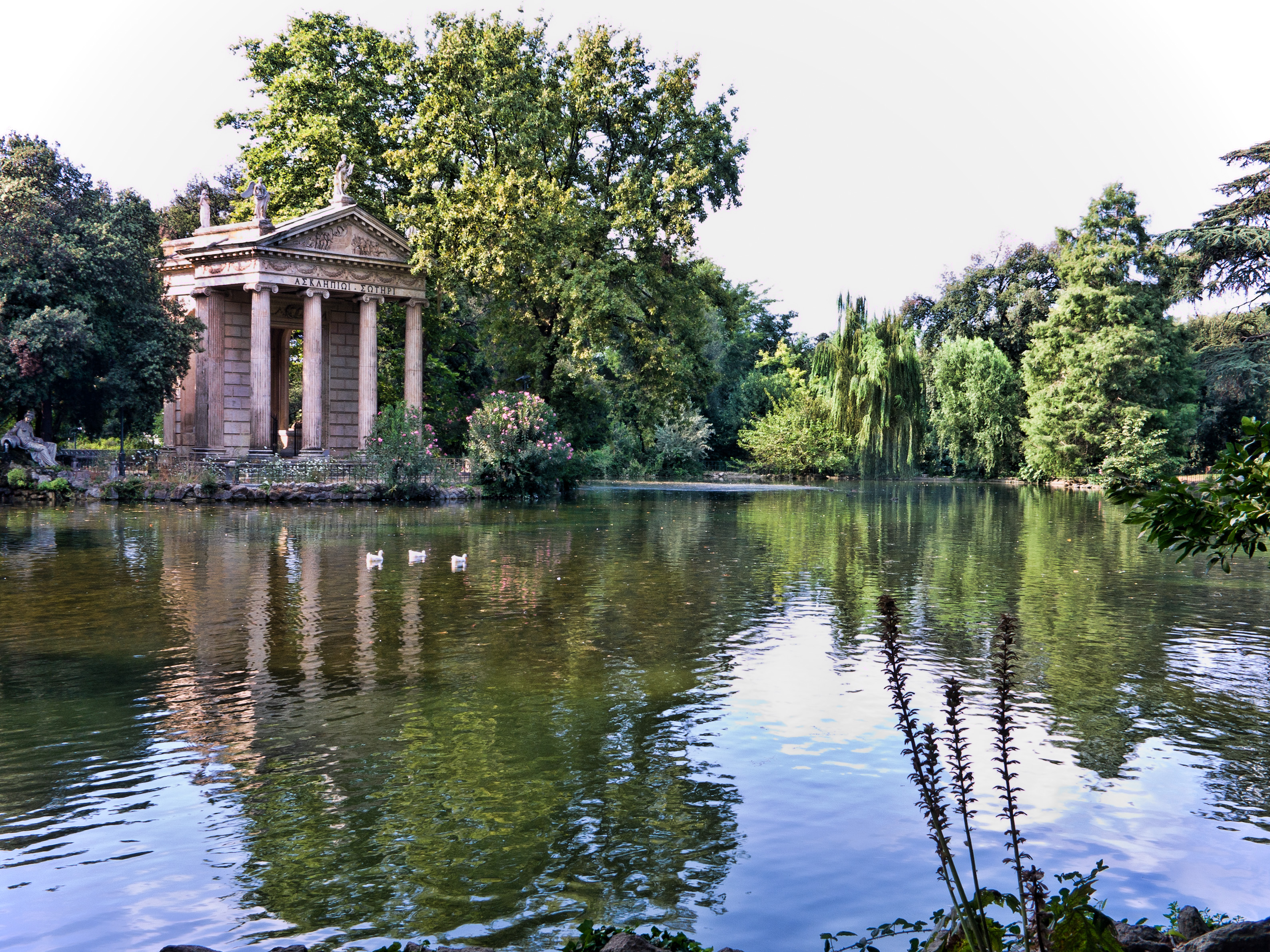
Temple of Aesculapius (19th century)

In the 18th century Marcantonio Borghese, 5th Prince of Sulmona transformed the villa's gardens from a formal garden architecture into an English landscape garden. Architect Antonio Asprucci and his son Mario worked on landscaping the villa's gardens, from 1782 for over twenty years. They placed statues around the park and started the construction of the Garden of the Lake and Piazza di Siena. They built the Temple of Aesculapius in the ionic style in the center of the lake between 1785 and 1792.

The Sea Horse Fountain was executed by Vincenzo Pacetti in 1791, based on a design by Christopher Unterberger. The Fountain of Venus was probably designed by Giovanni Vasanzio.

Marcantonio's sons, Camillo and Francesco Borghese expanded the park further. The Villa Borghese gardens were long informally open, but was bought by the commune of Rome and given to the public in 1903. Since 1904 monuments depicting famous foreign personalities and writers such as Victor Hugo, have been placed along the avenues of the villa. The statue of Goethe was a gift to the city of Rome from Wilhelm II, German Emperor.

The large landscape park in the English taste contains several villas. The Spanish Steps lead up to this park, and there is another entrance at the Porte del Popolo by Piazza del Popolo. The Pincio (the Pincian Hill of ancient Rome), in the south part of the park, offers one of the greatest views over Rome.

Camillo Borghese threw grandiose shows and popular festivals, such as a ride in an air balloon from the Piazza di Siena. The first horse show was held at the Piazza di Siena in 1922. The Piazza di Siena hosted the equestrian dressage, individual jumping, and the jumping part of the eventing competition for the 1960 Summer Olympics.

== Villas in the gardens ==
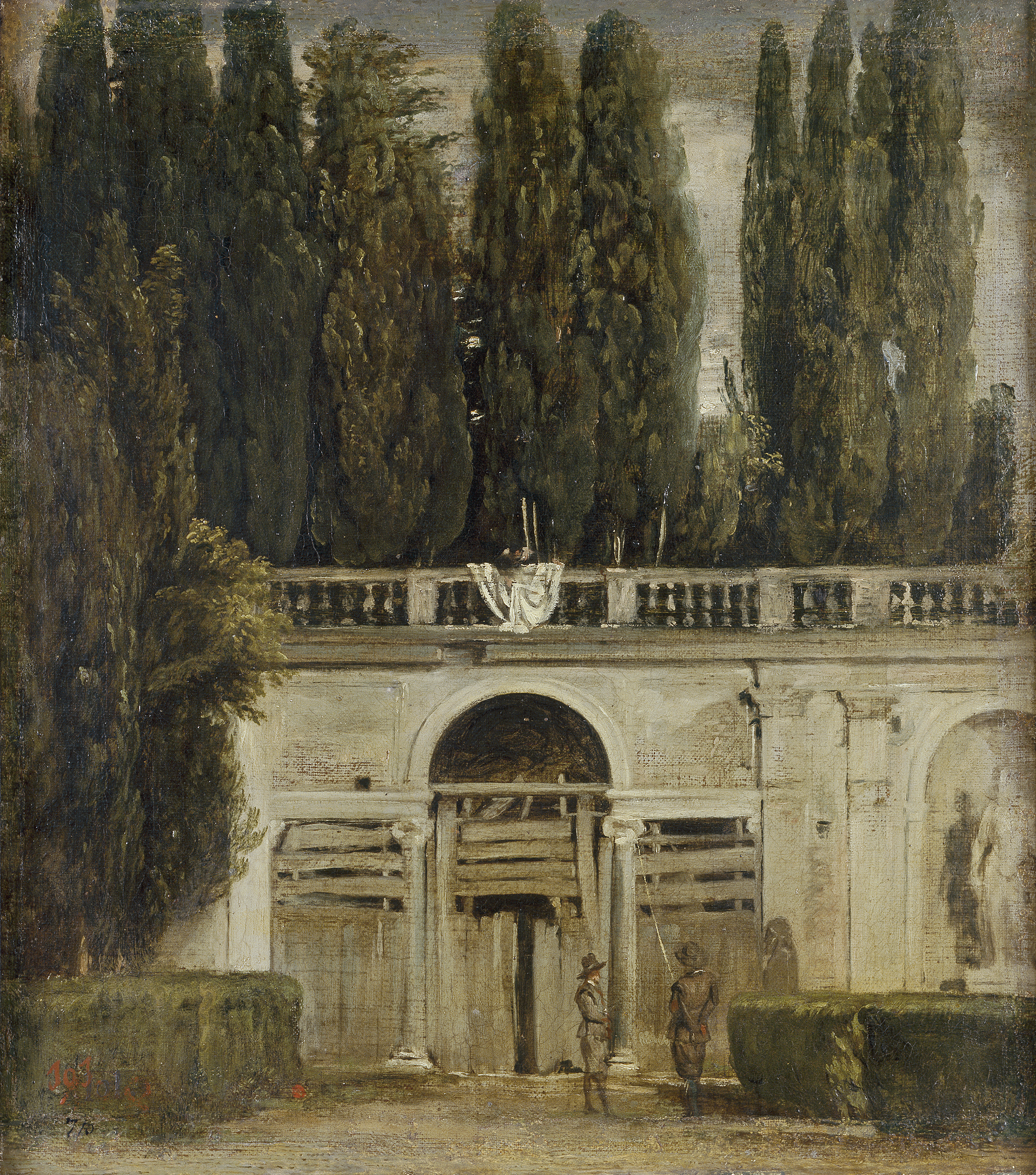
Painting by Diego Velázquez

- Today the Galleria Borghese is housed in the Villa Borghese itself. The garden Casino Borghese, built on a rise above the Villa by the architect Giovanni Vasanzio, was set up by Camillo Borghese to contain sculptures by Bernini from the Borghese collection, including his David and his Daphne, and paintings by Titian, Raphael and Caravaggio
- The Villa Giulia adjoining the Villa Borghese gardens was built in 1551 – 1555 as a summer residence for Pope Julius III; now it contains the Etruscan Museum (Museo Etrusco).
- The Villa Medici houses the French Academy in Rome, and the Fortezzuola a Gothic garden structure that houses a collection memorializing the academic modern sculptor Pietro Canonica. In the 1650s, Diego Velázquez painted several depictions of this Villa's garden casino festively illuminated at night. Before electricity, such torchlit illuminations carried an excitement hard to conceive today.
- Other villas scattered through the Villa Borghese gardens are remains of a world exposition in Rome in 1911.
  - The Galleria Nazionale d'Arte Moderna located in its grounds has a collection of 19th- and 20th-century paintings emphasizing Italian artists.
  - Architecturally the most notable of the 1911 exposition pavilions is the English pavilion designed by Sir Edwin Lutyens (who later designed New Delhi), now housing the British School at Rome.

== Gardens ==
- Giardino del Lago

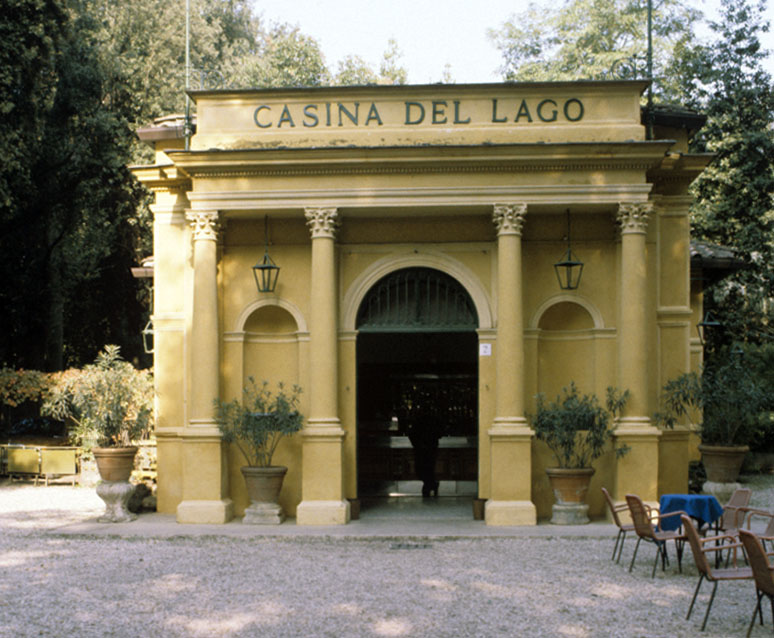
The Casina del lago in 1972

The accesses to the garden are in via Madama Letizia and in viale Pietro Canonica. This is an English garden, transformed by Piano dei Licini by Marcantonio IV Borghese at the end of the 18th century into a fashionable garden. Together with the Aspruccis as directors of the works, people like Jacob More alternated between gardeners and artists. Characteristic is the lake in which the Temple of Aesculapius is reflected.
The first historical sources attesting to the works on the Piano dei Licini date back to 1784, works which ended in 1790 with Mario Asprucci as director. In addition to the aforementioned temple of Aesculapius, the temple of Antoninus and Faustina and the temple of Diana were inserted, all in neoclassical style, works immersed in an English garden style garden, although the presence of straight paths and the use of classical furnishings were quite far from the fashionable gardens of the time in France and England. Very little remains of these furnishings: in addition to the three temples, the sarcophagus of Phaethon, a column, some ollas and a statue. But contemporary citations suggest the area was dotted with statues. The most recent statuary group is the bronze one with satyrs playing with their little one, from 1929.

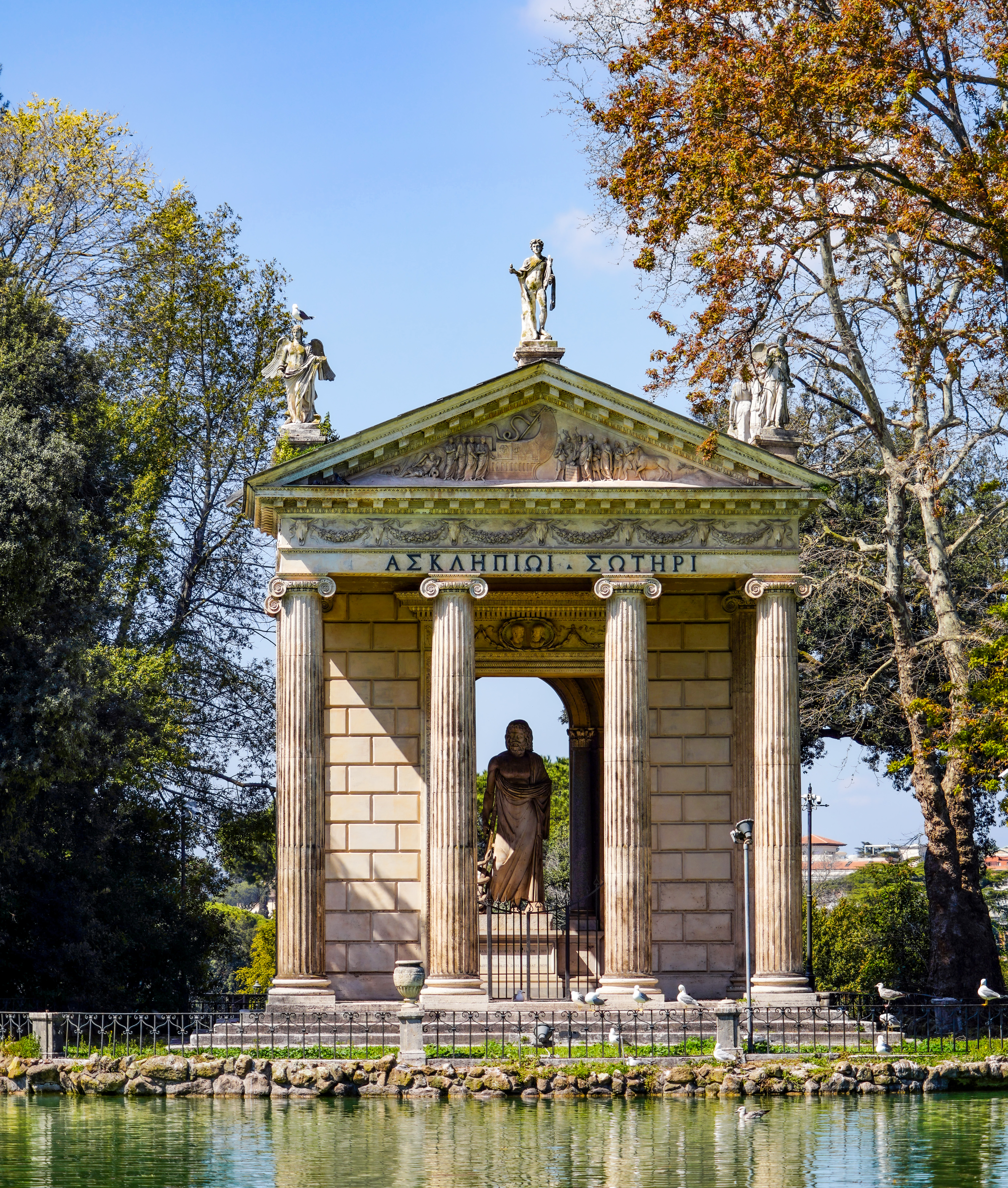
The Temple of Aesculapius

- Piazzale Scipione Borghese Garden or Rear Garden of Casino Nobile

Originally there was the Narcissus fountain surrounded by ancient statues, furnishings and four herms perhaps by Pietro Bernini and Gian Lorenzo Bernini. The garden, as we see it today, is a twentieth-century development with the replacement of the previous fountain with that of Venus surrounded by a classical garden.

- Giardini Segreti (Secret Gardens)

They are located in Viale dell'Uccelliera, on the border between the first and second enclosures.
Originally they were located on both sides of the Casino Nobile. The first was called melangoli, while the second was called flowers. They date back to the period of Cardinal Scipione. There are two others dating back to around 1680 located between the Uccelliera and Meridiana pavilions. They were used for plantations of rare and exotic flowers, mainly bulb. One of these gardens had rows of citrus trees near the long surrounding walls and flowers in the central avenues. In the ledgers of 1610 there are payment orders for bulbous plants. The fourth garden, or propagation garden, is used as a nursery for plants to be used for the other three secret gardens.
These gardens are derived from the 'hortus conclusus of the Middle Ages, the Renaissance and the Baroque era. In these periods the secret gardens are always surrounded by walls.
After the oldest gardens, marble fountains were placed with the function of pilo.
In the 19th century the secret gardens were devastated by French bombings.
At the beginning of the 20th century with the opening to the public, a new rearrangement rearranged the plants by removing all the plants considered inappropriate at the time and the rearrangement was simpler and more linear and divided into four flowerbeds located around the central fountains. Towards the beginning of the First World War, a new intervention was already planned for the first three secret gardens with the arrangement of two gazebos for guests, but already after the war these gazebos no longer existed, as did the Narcissus fountain, leaving the square bare and empty. New flowerbeds were then inserted which were destroyed during the Second World War, however, after various transformations over the centuries, little remains of the original layout of the secret gardens.
You can get guided tours of the Giardini Segreti.

- Giardini di Valle Giulia

They are located in Piazzale Ferdowsi. They were created for the Italian National Exhibition: Turin, Rome, Florence of 1911 to decorate the staircase created by Cesare Bazzani as a connection from Valle Giulia to Villa itself. The gardens balustrade consist of two nymphaeums neoclassical.

- Parco dei Daini

It is located in via P. Raimondi. The garden was a reserve of the prince and was surrounded by some herms by Pietro and Gian Lorenzo Bernini. Attached to the border wall there was the "Perspective of the Theatre", from 1615, with relief decorations. The name derives from the fact that in the park, until the end of the Nineteenth century, there were fallow deer and gazelles.
On the edge of the Parco dei Daini, on the corner between via Pinciana and via Pietro Raimondi, is located the "Villa Umberto Barracks", headquarters of the mounted squad of the Polizia di Stato.

- Valle dei Platani

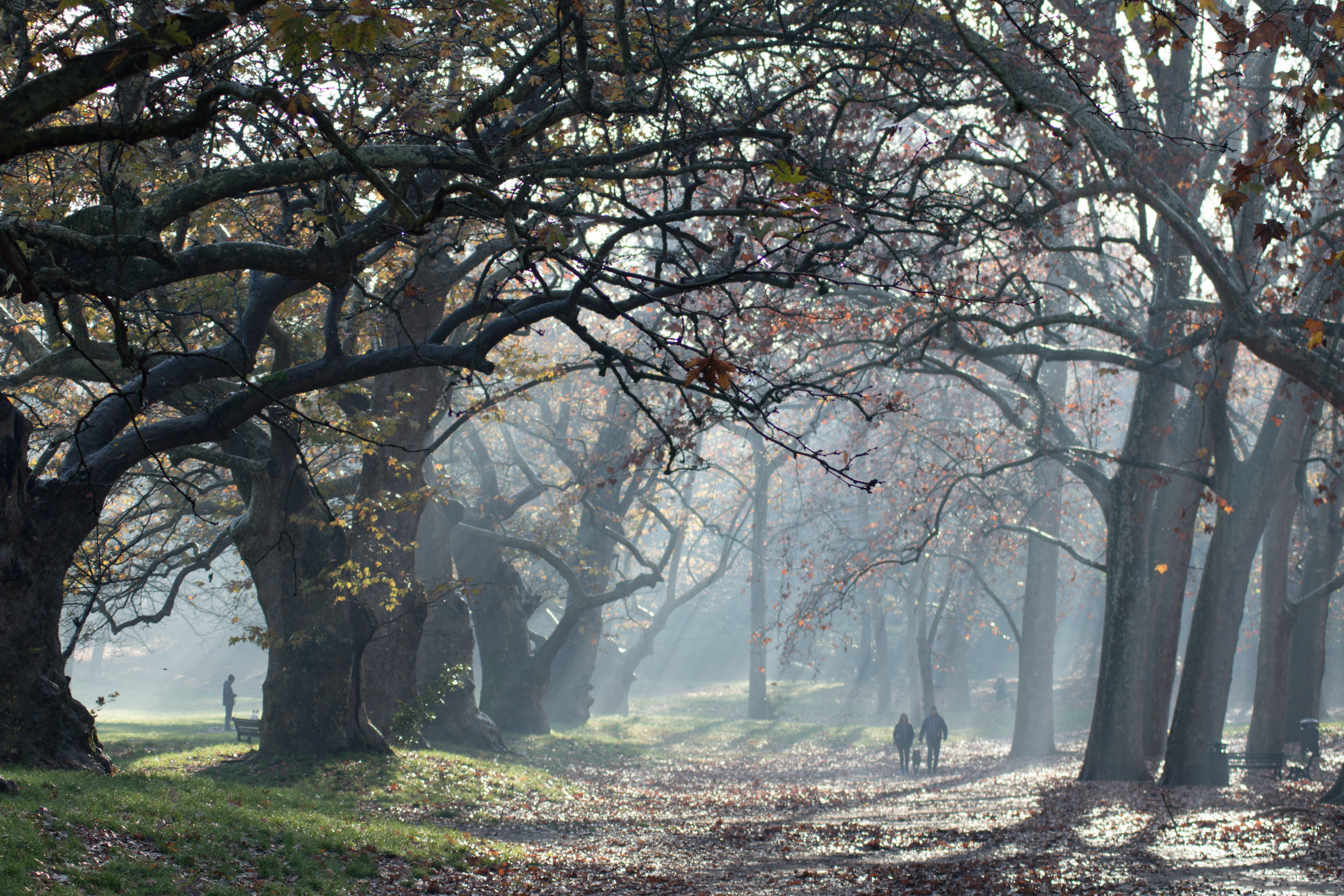
Valle dei Platani in Villa Borghese on a December morning

It is located in Largo P. Picasso. It has remained more or less unchanged since the 17th century and is also known by the name of "Valle dei cani" ("Valley of the dogs"), because it is used as a play area for dogs. It consists, among other things, of platani planted by Cardinal Scipione.

== Museums ==
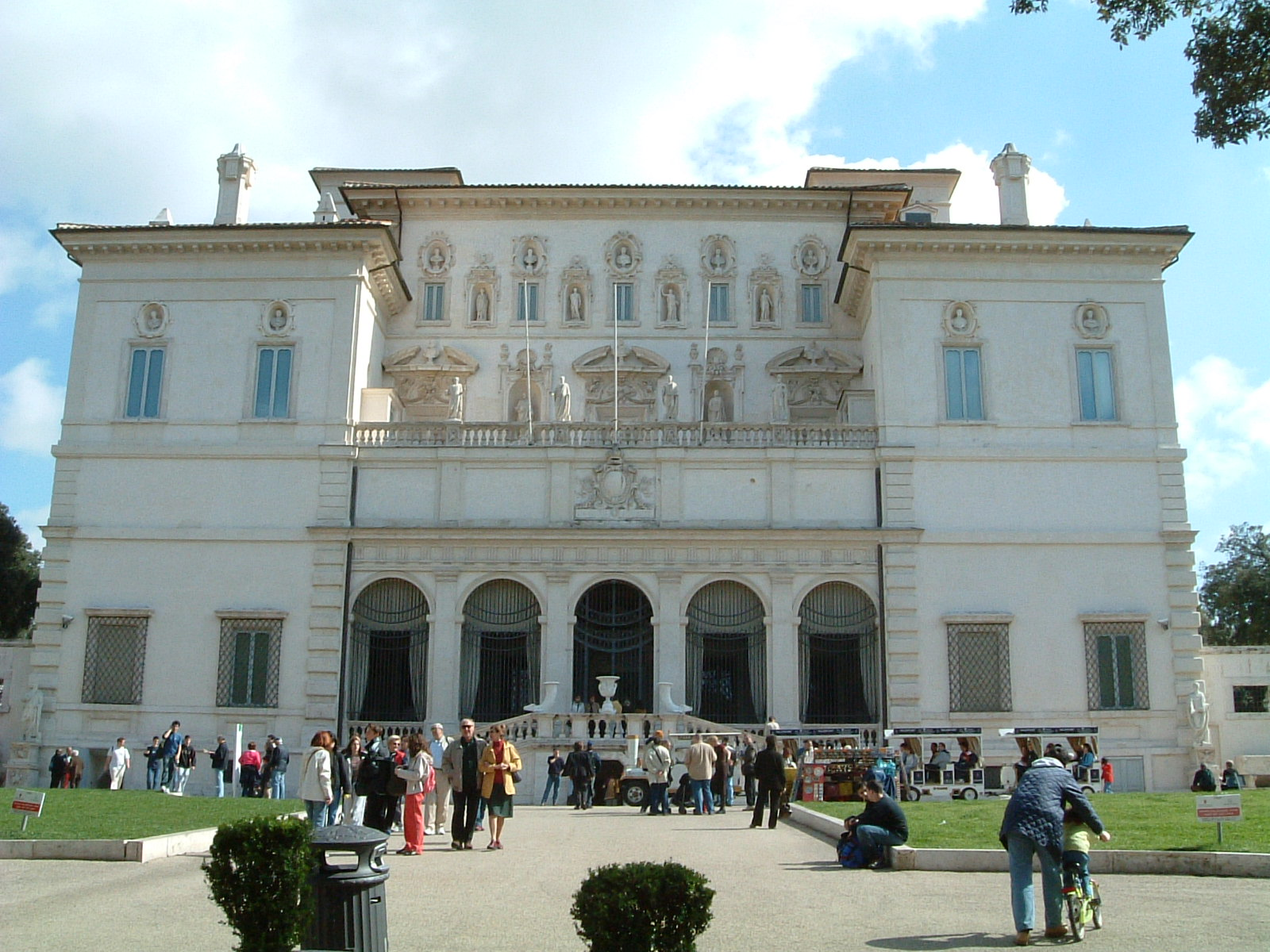
The Galleria Borghese

Numerous museums are located inside or near the park:

- The Galleria Borghese
- The Museo Canonica
- The Museo Carlo Bilotti
- The Galleria Nazionale d’Arte Moderna
- The National Etruscan Museum of Villa Giulia
- The Museo Civico di Zoologia

Furthermore, the park hosts the Casa del cinema, the Casina di Raffaello and the Gigi Proietti Globe Theatre.

== Other points of interest ==
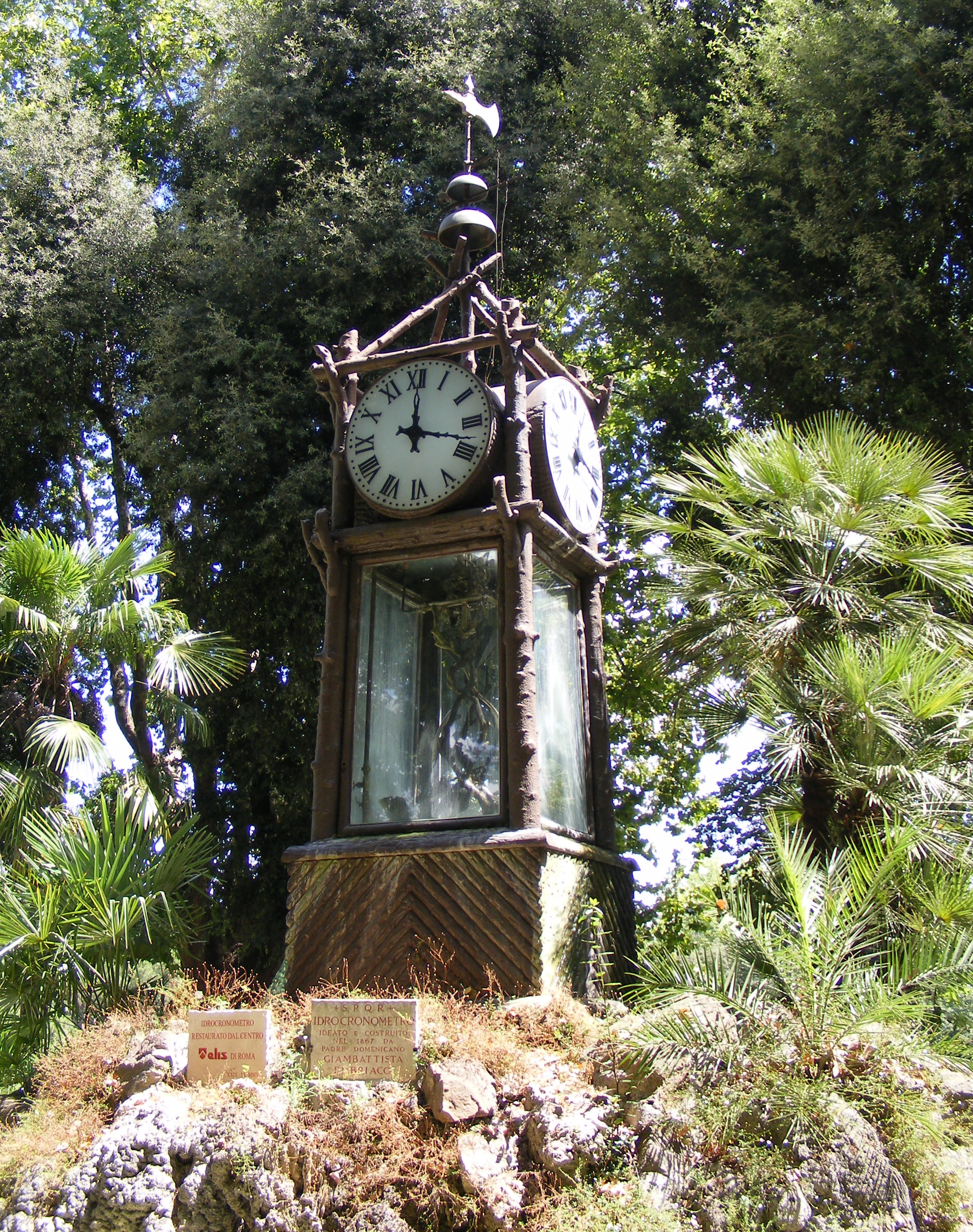
Hydrochronometer by Embriaco

- The garden contains a replica of the Shakespeare's Globe Theatre built in 2003.
- Beside the 1911 Exposition's villas, there is the Exposition's Zoo, recently redesigned, with minimal caging, as the Bioparco, and the Zoological Museum (Museo di Zoologia). Nearby is the Casina di Raffaello playroom, which has crafts and reading rooms, and a space where children can dress up in royal outfits.
- In 1873 a hydrochronometer on the 1867 design of Gian Battista Embriaco, O.P. inventor and professor of the Roman College of St. Thomas was built in the gardens in emulation of the one at the College of St. Thomas. Another version stands in the gardens of the Pincian Hill. Embriaco had presented two prototypes of his invention at the Paris Universal Exposition in 1867 where it won prizes and great acclaim.

== Flora ==
Below is the list of the main trees of Villa Borghese:

Plant common name	Scientific name
Bald cypress	Taxodium distichum
Larch	Larix decidua
Stone pine or pine nuts pine	Pinus pinea
White pine	Pinus strobus
Cypresses	Cupressus sempervirens
Bald cypress of the swamps	Taxodium distichum
Cedar of the Atlas Mountains	Cedrus atlantica
Himalayan cedar	Cedrus deodara
Cedar of Lebanon	Cedrus libani
Silver fir	Abies alba
Spruce	Picea abies
Holm oak	Quercus ilex
Oak from cork	Quercus suber
Cerro	Quercus cerris
Red oak	Quercus rubra
Farnia	Quercus robur
Siberian elm	Ulmus pumila
Field elm	Ulmus campestris or Ulmus minor
Bagolaro or stonebreaker	Celtis australis
Cypress poplars	Populus nigra italic variety
Black poplar	Populus nigra
Triacanthus	Gleditsia triacanthos
Lime trees	Tilia cordata
Nuts	Juglans nigra
Nuts	Juglans directed
Ailanti	Ailanthus glandulosa
Maples	Acer negundo
Maples	Acer campestris or Acer campestre
Horse chestnuts	Aesculus hippocastanum
Robinia	Robinia pseudoacacia
Judas tree or siliquastrum	Cercis siliquastrum
Tree of the Rosary	Melia azedarach
Paulonia	Paulownia tomentosa
Koelreuteria	Koelreuteria paniculata

And here is the list of herbaceous plants of Villa Borghese:

Plant common name	Scientific name
Daisy	Bellis perennis
Flavagello	Ranunculus ficaria
Anemone	Anemone stellata hortensis
Marigold	Calendula arvensis
Asphodel	Asphodelus albus
Romulea	Romulea bubocondium
Hyacinth wild	Bellevalia ciliata
Ornithogalum	Ornithogallum umbellatum
Wild garlic	Allium neapolitanum
Greater hemlock	Conium maculatum
Orchid	Ophyx apifera
Aro or gigaro	Arum italicum
Cyclamen	Ciclamen neapolitanum
Periwinkle	Vinca major
Caper	Capparis spinosa
Polypodium	Polipodium vulgaris
Ferns	Anogramma leptophylla

== Fauna ==
Avifauna located throughout the villa:

Animal common name	Scientific name
Blackbird	Turdus merula
Hooded crow	Corvus cornix
Jackdaw	Coloeus monedula
Cancellation	Sturnus vulgaris
House sparrow Great tit	Passer domesticus italiae Parus major
Robin	Erithacus rubecula
Finch	Fringilla coelebs
Wren	Troglodytes troglodytes
Goldfinch	Carduelis carduelis
Great Spotted Woodpecker	Dendrocopos major
Rose-Ringed Parakeet	Psittacula krameri
Peregrine Falcon	Falco peregrinus
Kestrel	Falco tinnunculus
Owl	Athene noctua
Tawny Owl	Strix aluco

Birdlife located in the small artificial lake:

Animal common name	Scientific name
Geese	
Domestic duck	Anas platyrhynchos domesticus
Black-headed gull	Larus ridibundus
Herring gull	Larus cachinnans
Gadwall	Anas strepera
Mallard duck	Anas platyrhynchos
Cormorant	Phalacrocorax carbo
Gray Heron	Ardea cinerea
Moorhen	Gallinula chloropus

Ichthyofauna:

Animal common name	Scientific name
Largemouth bass	Micropterus salmoides
Bluegill	Lepomis gibbosus
Carp	Cyprinus carpio
Gambusie	Gambusia affinis holbrooki

Mammals:

Animal common name	Scientific name
Squirrel	Sciurus vulgaris
Black rat	Rattus rattus
Wild mouse	Apodemus sylvaticus
Hedgehog	Erinaceus europaeus

Reptiles:

Animal common name	Scientific name
Wall lizard	Podarcis muralis
Country lizard	Podarcis sicula
Gecko	Tarentola mauritanica
Turtle American swamp turtle	Trachemys scripta elegans
Pond turtle	Emys orbicularis
Biacco	Hierophis viridiflavus
Colubra of Aesculapius	Elaphe longissima

Finally, among the xylophagous insects, it is worth mentioning the great capricorn beetle (Cerambyx cerdo) visible in late spring towards sunset on the tree trunks.

== In popular culture ==
- The Villa's gardens feature in one of Ottorino Respighi's tone poems on the Pines of Rome.
- The gardens are the setting of chapters 8–11 of Nathaniel Hawthorne's novel The Marble Faun.
- The Villa's gardens are featured in The Driver's Seat, a film adaptation of Muriel Spark's novel of the same name.
- The Villa is referenced by Phil Collins in his 1996 song, "Lorenzo".
- The gardens are featured in the "Rome Avanti" course in the video games Mario Kart Tour and Mario Kart 8 Deluxe.
- The Villa is mentioned in Fyodor Dostoevsky’s 1864 novel Notes from Underground.
- The Villa features prominently as a setpiece in Mark Helprin's 1991 novel A Soldier of the Great War.

== Gallery ==
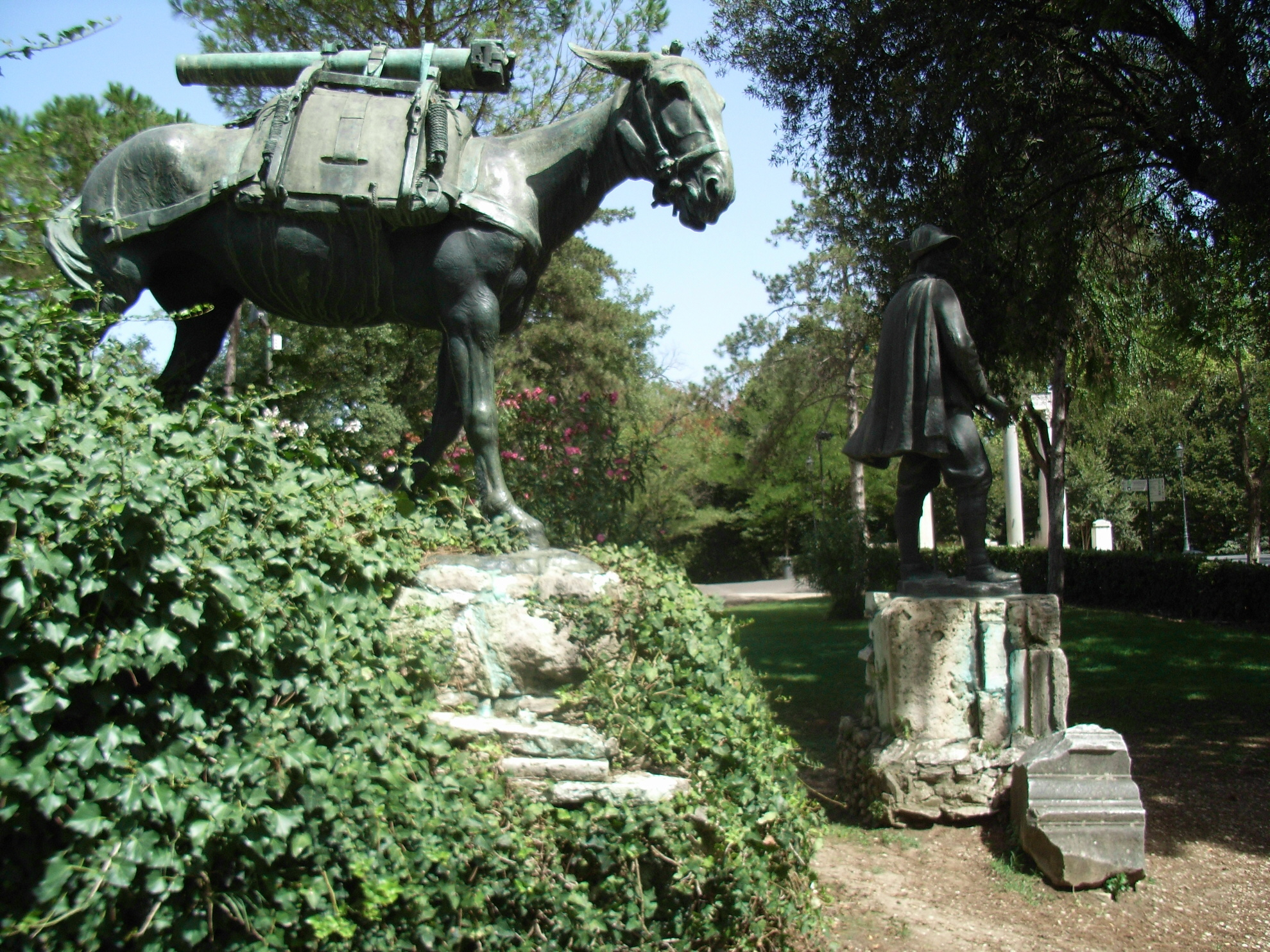
Alpini monument

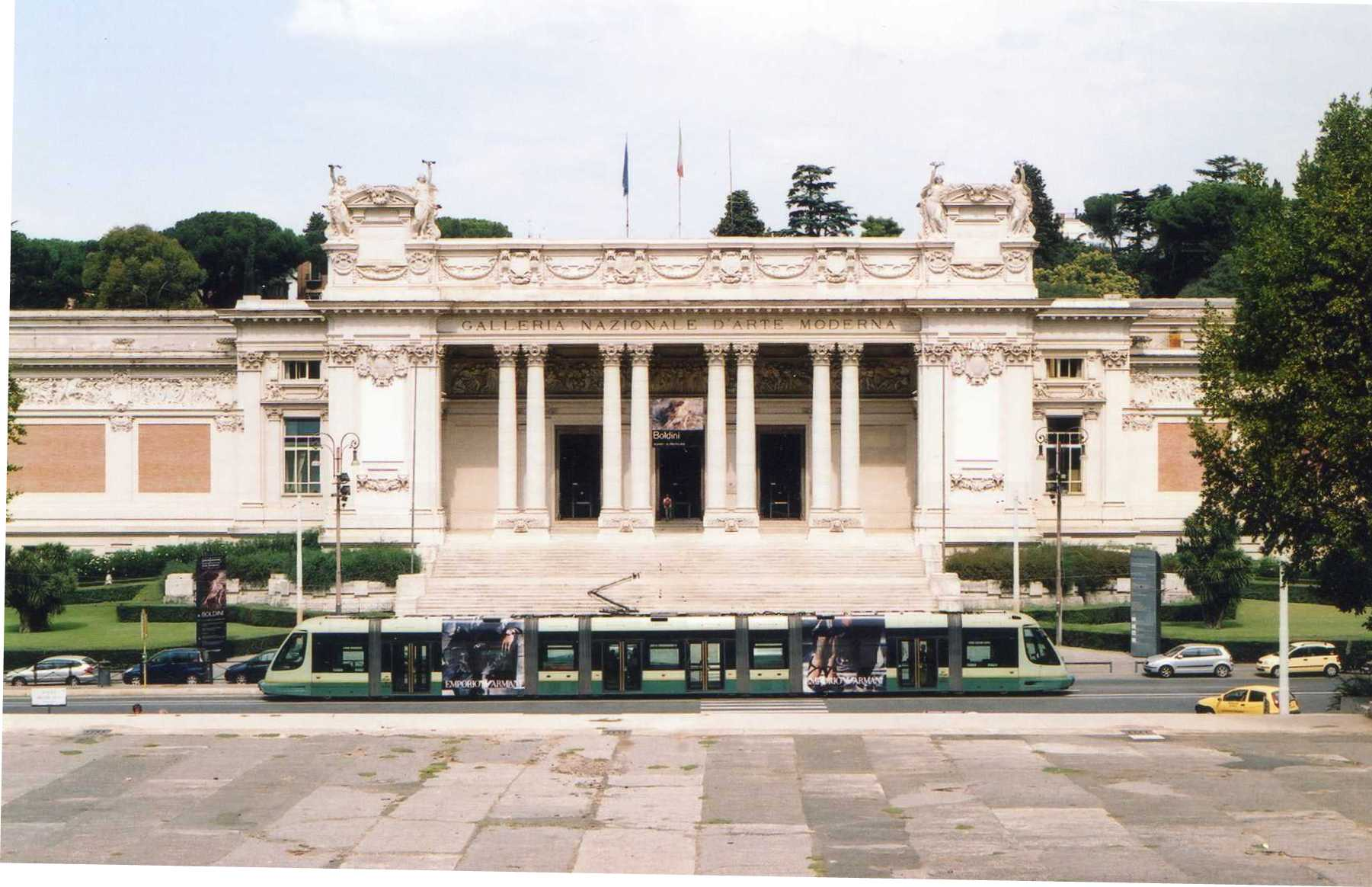
Galleria Nazionale d'Arte Moderna

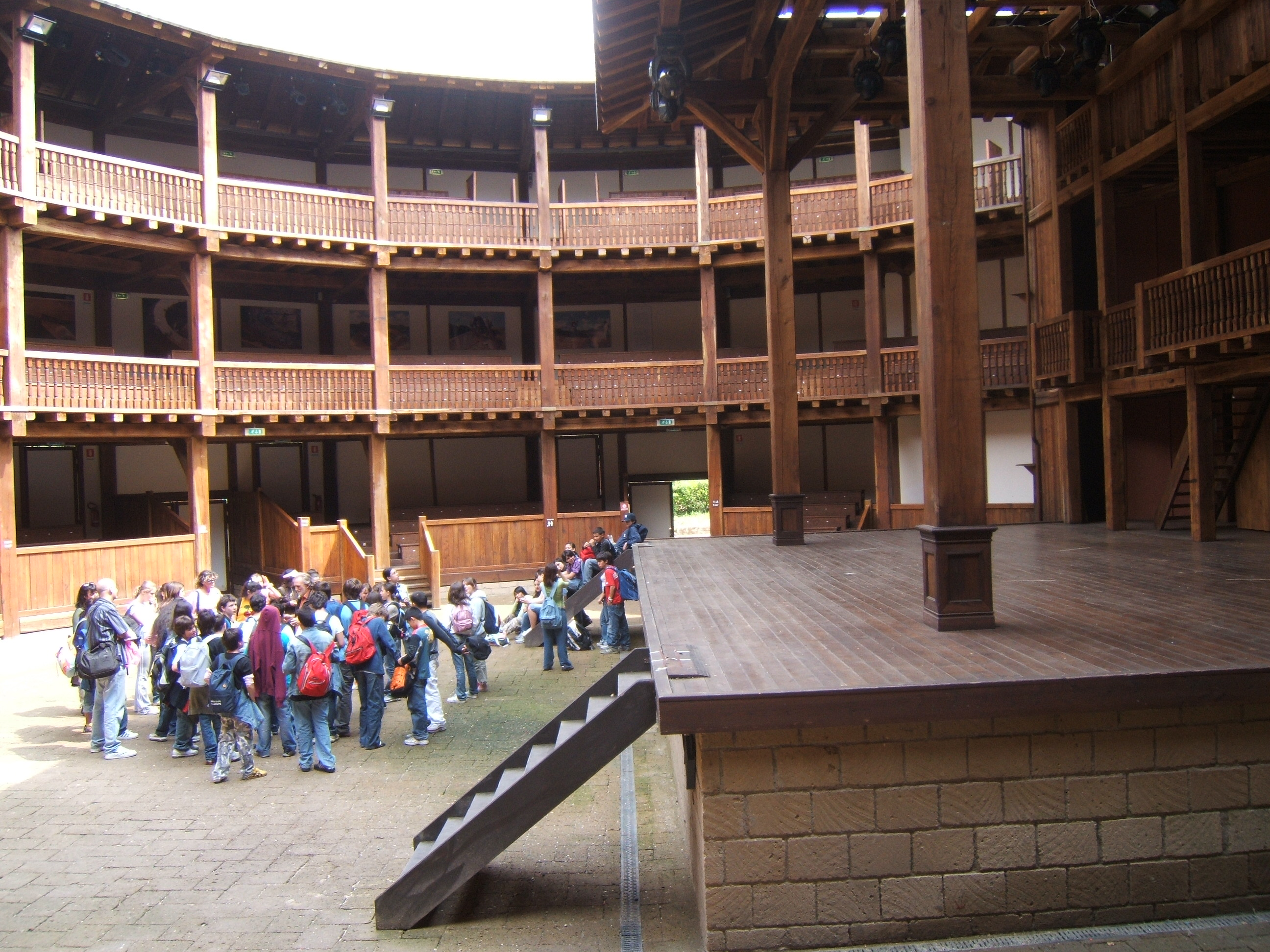
The Gigi Proietti Globe Theatre Silvano Toti

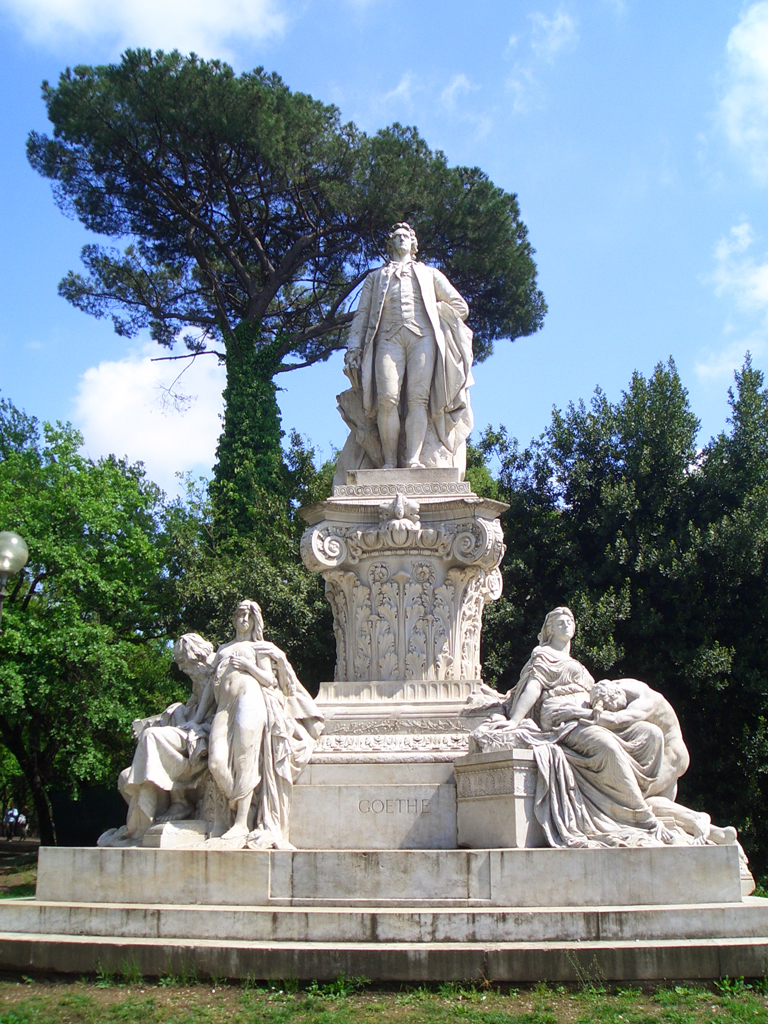
Monument to Goethe

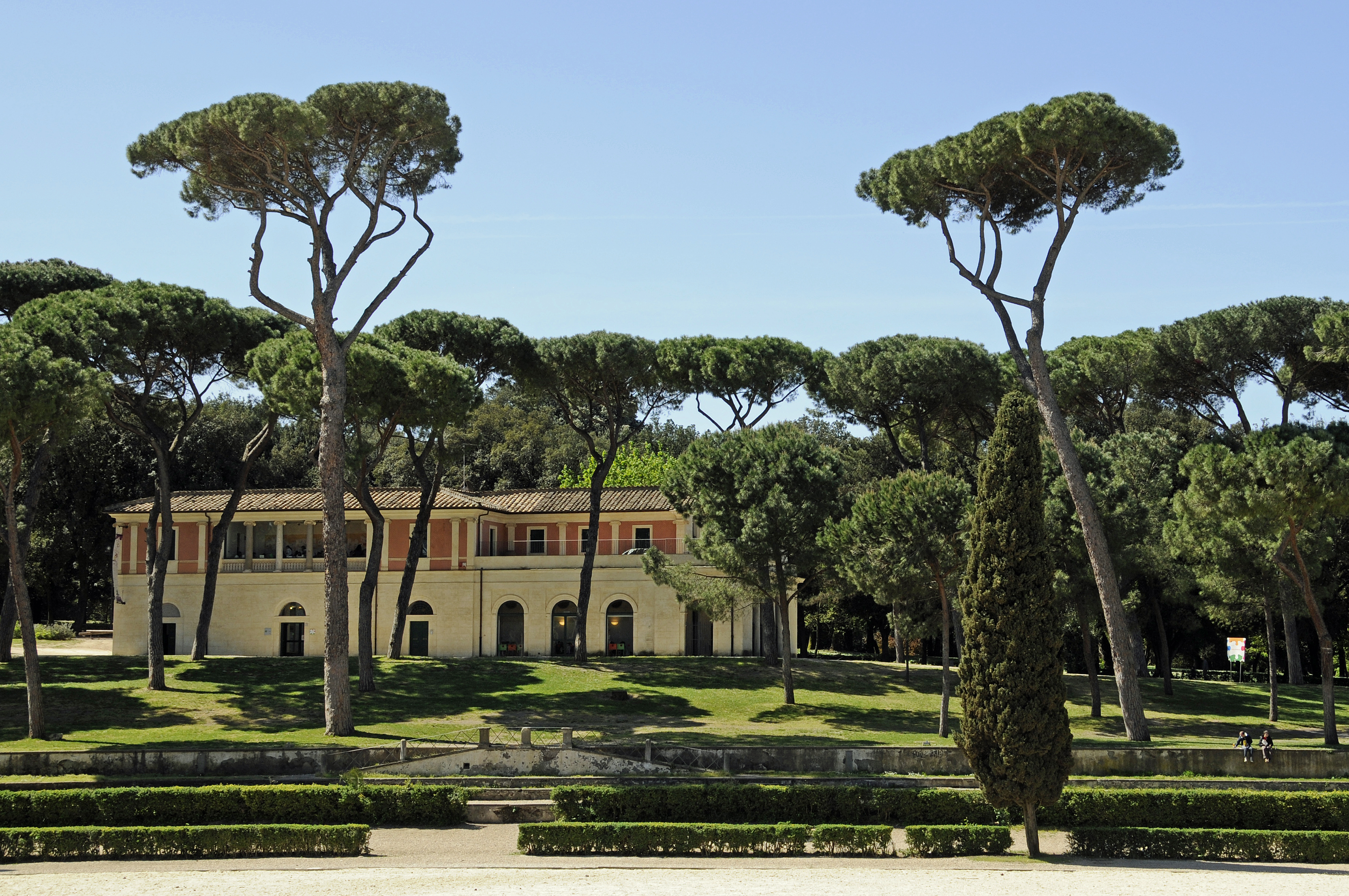
View of the park

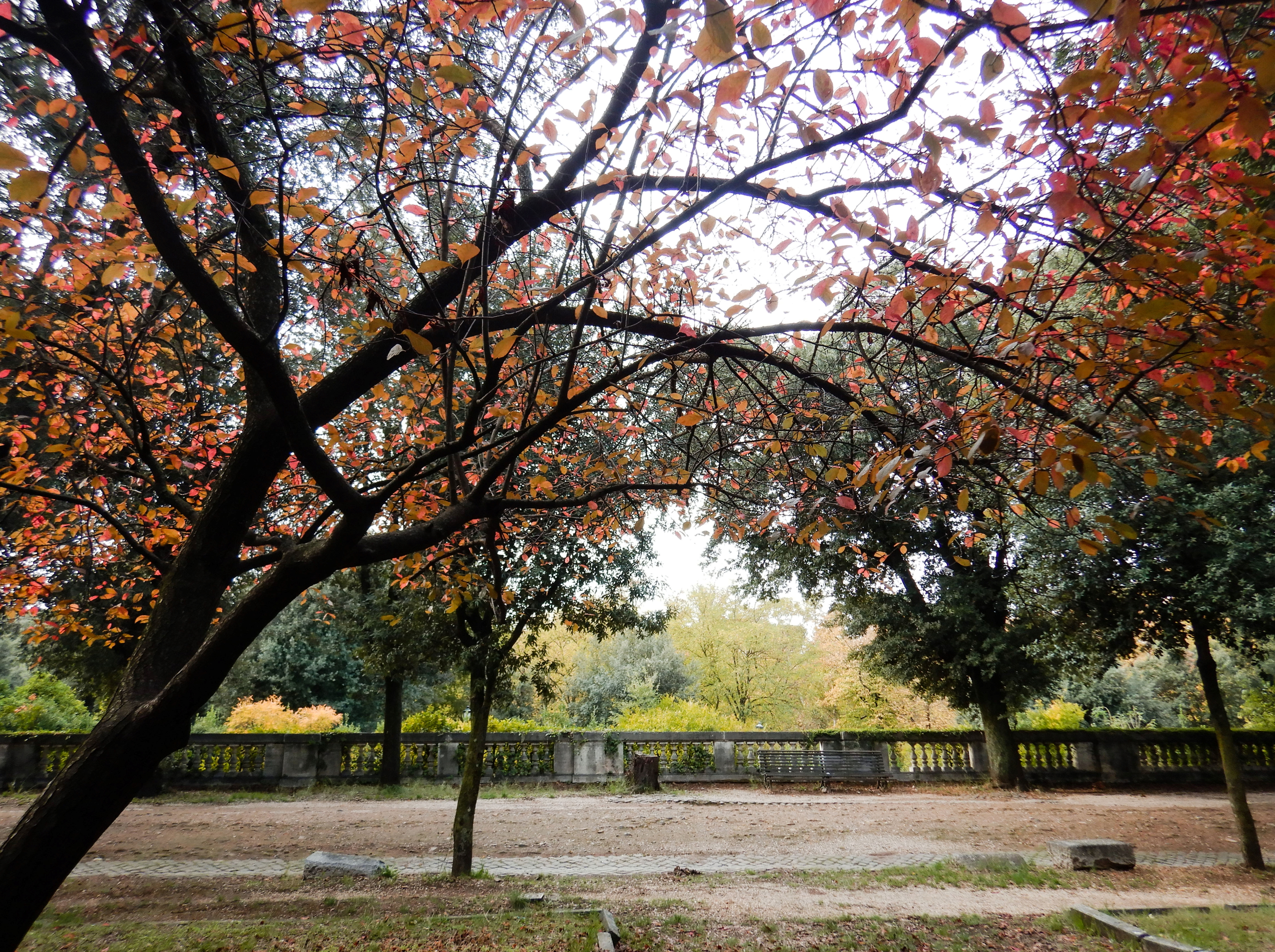
Autumn on the terrace of the Parco dei Daini

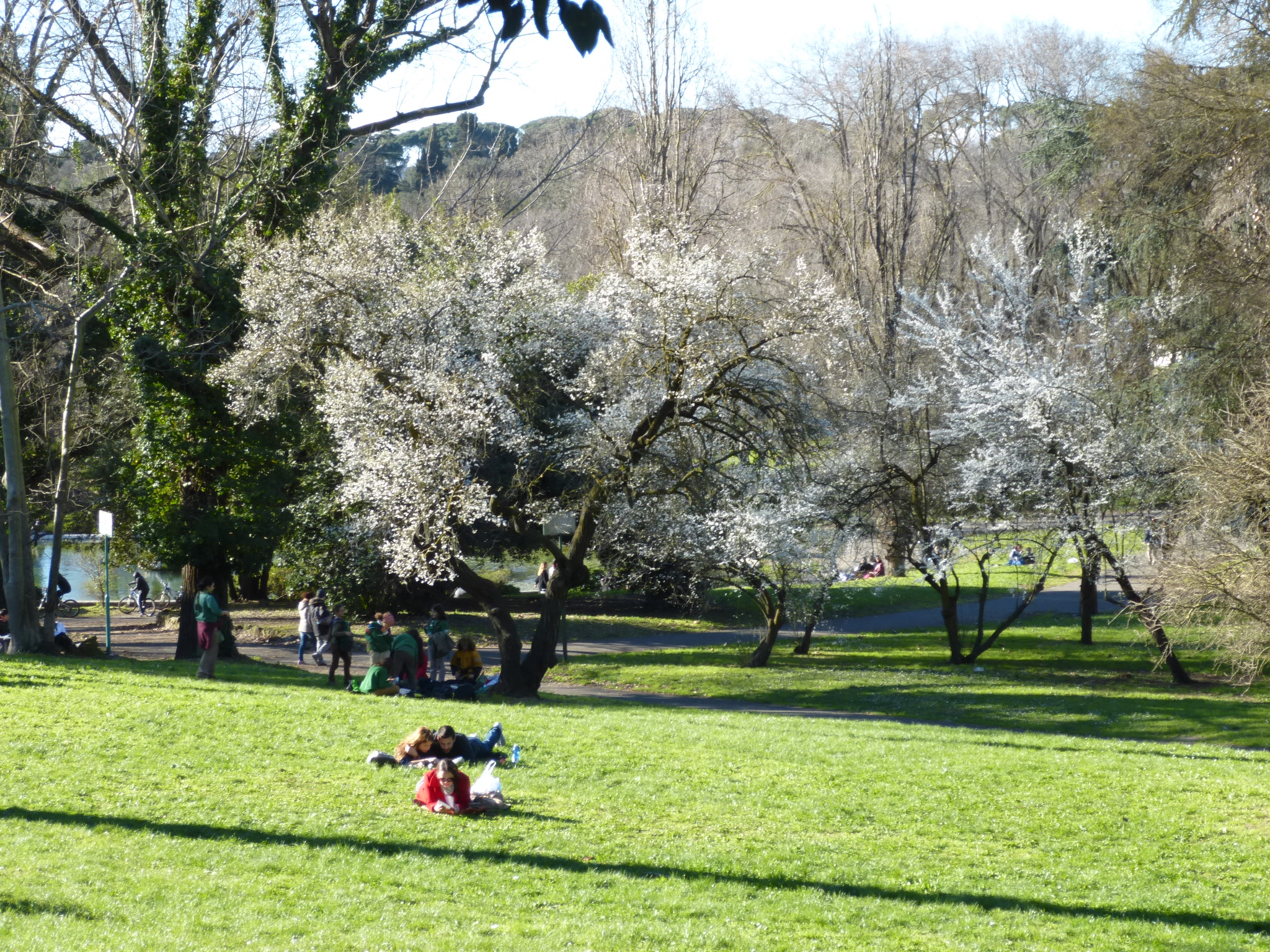
Villa Borghese in winter

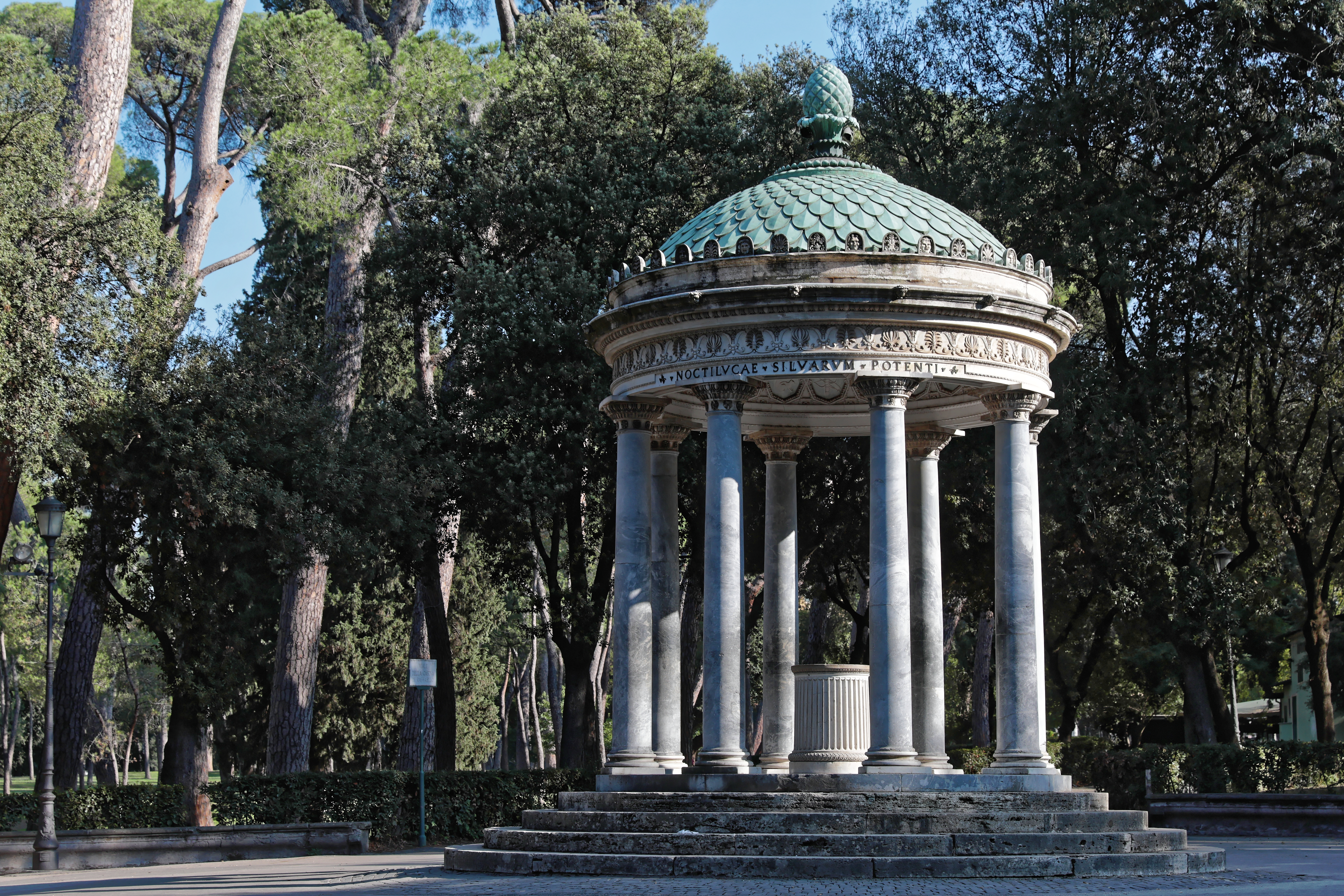
The Temple of Diana

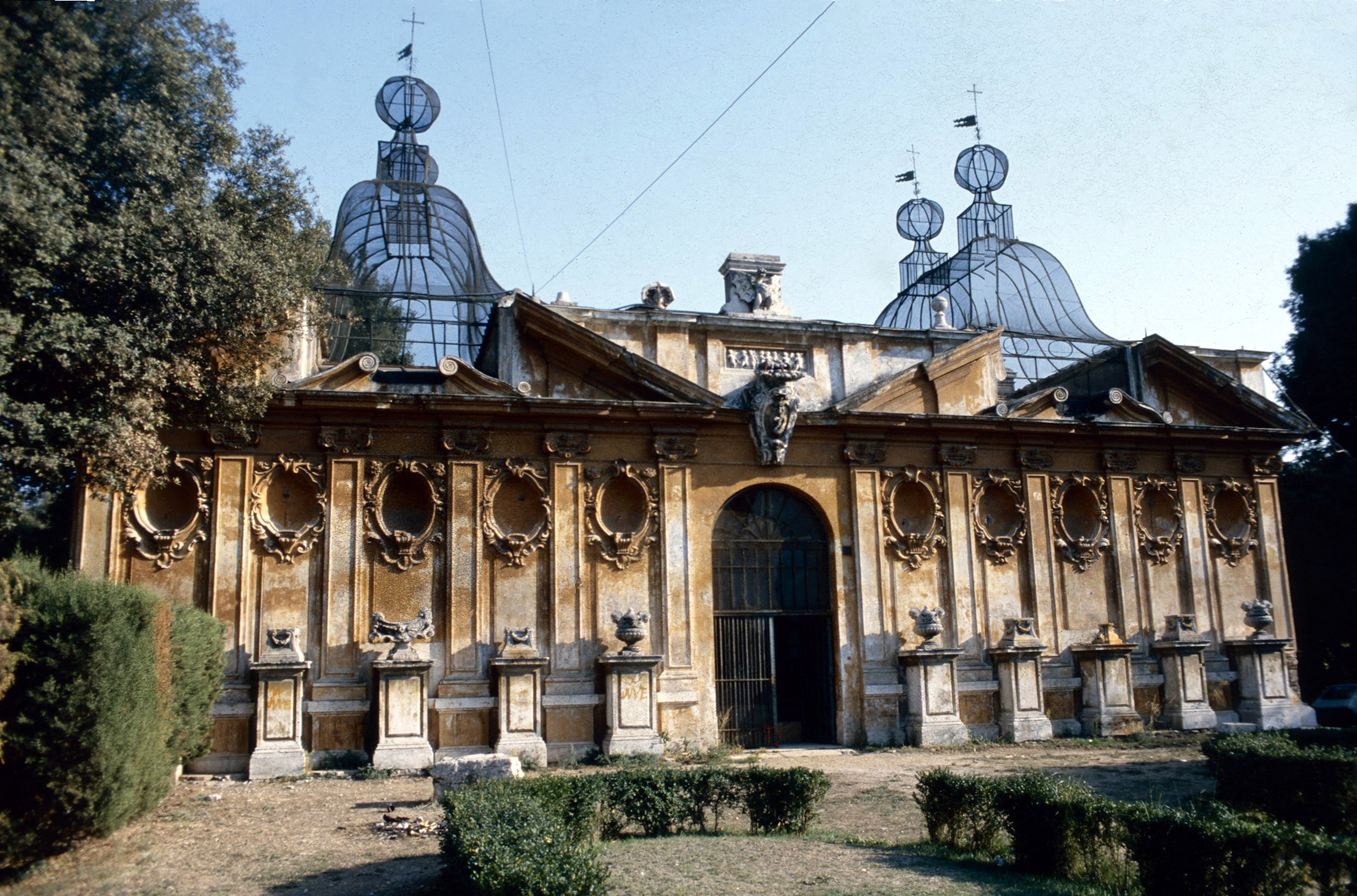
Padiglione dell’Uccelliera in 1984

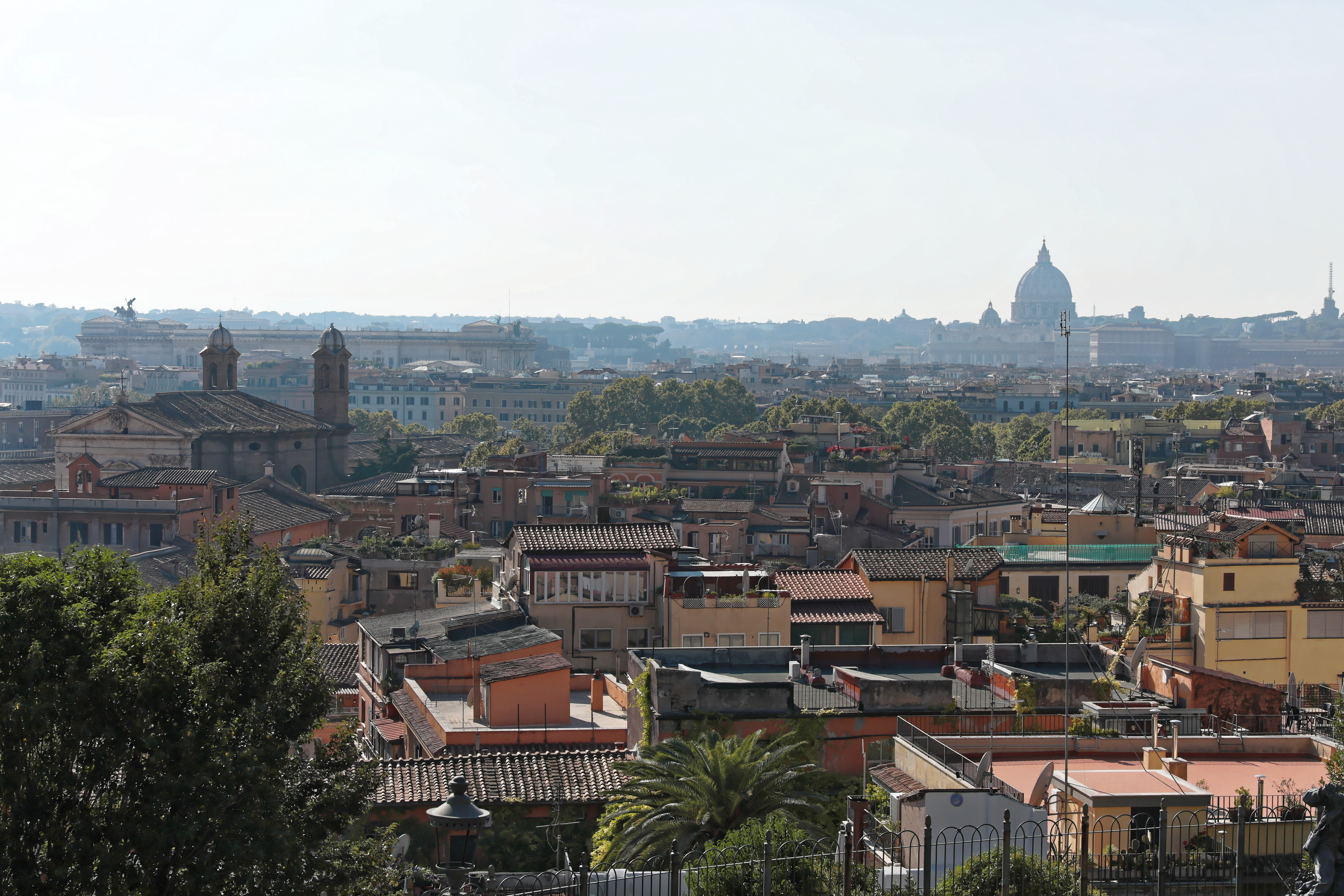
View of Rome from the Villa

== Transport Links ==
- Flaminio and Spagna metro stations
- It can be reached from the Flaminio terminus of the tram
- It can be reached from the Valle Giulia terminus and from the Galleria Arte Moderna, Aldrovandi and Bioparco stops of the tram
- Villa Giulia Museo Etrusco – Bioparco – Galleria Nazionale d’Arte Moderna – Aldrovandi stops of the tram
- Flaminio railway station

== See also ==
- List of parks and gardens in Rome
- List of tourist attractions in Rome
- Scipione Borghese

== Notes ==
Preceded by Villa Ada	Landmarks of Rome; Villa Borghese gardens	Succeeded by Villa Doria Pamphili
