= Andrea Pozzi =

Italian painter

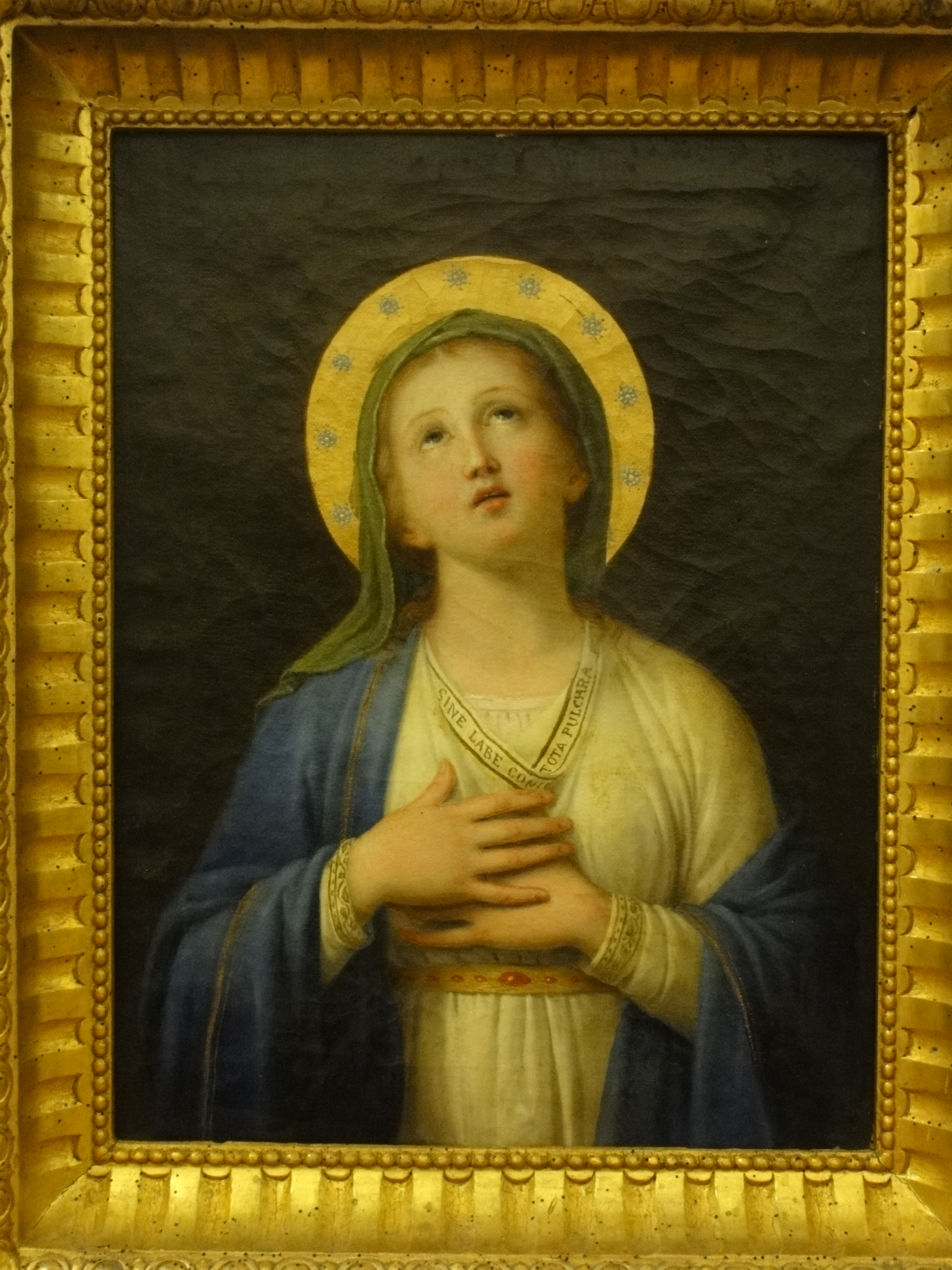
The Immaculate Conception, in the Sacro Convento

Andrea Pozzi (1778–1833) was an Italian painter, active mainly in his native Rome, as a painter of religious and mythologic histories.

He painted a Virgin and Saints, painted for the City of Camerino. In 1820 he painted a Martyrdom of St. Stephen for a chapel of Santa Maria Rotundo in Rome. He was President of the Accademia di San Luca for many years.
