= Temple of Aesculapius (Villa Borghese) =

Temple in Rome, Italy

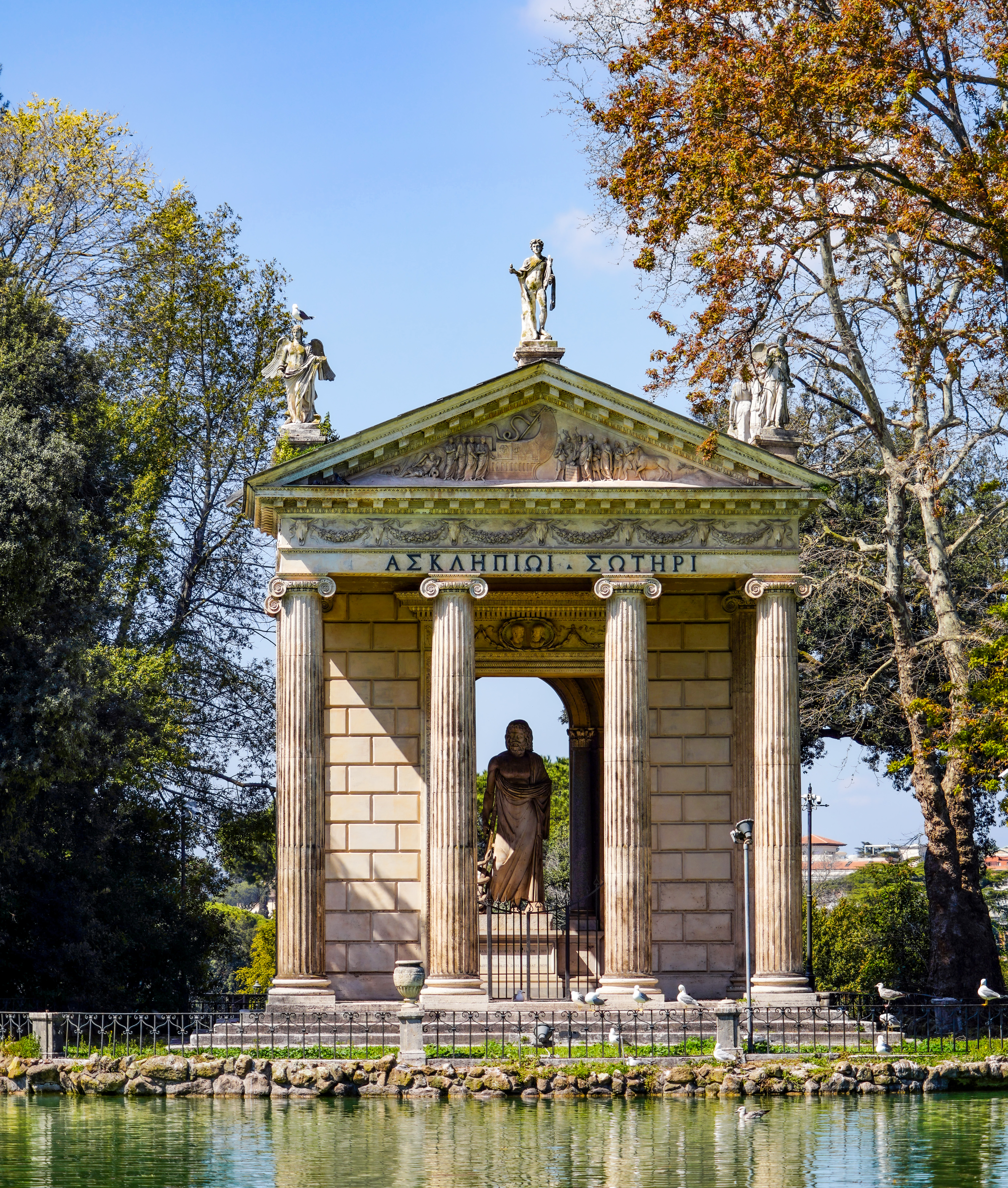
- Temple of Aesculapius
- Interactive map of Temple of Aesculapius
- 41°54′54″N 12°28′58″E

The Temple of Aesculapius (Italian: Tempio di Esculapio) is a neoclassical building located in Villa Borghese gardens, Rome. It was built in the ionic style between 1785 and 1792 by Antonio Asprucci and his son Mario Asprucci, with help from Cristoforo Unterperger. The temple was perhaps built in memory of a destroyed ancient temple to Aesculapius (the Greek god of Medicine) on Tiber Island.

The temple houses an ancient statue of Aesculapius, thought to be originally from the Mausoleum of Augustus. Neglected over the centuries, it was restored by Vincenzo Pacetti and sold to Marcantonio Borghese IV in 1785.

== See also ==
- List of Ancient Roman temples
