= Antonio Asprucci =

Italian architect (1723–1808)

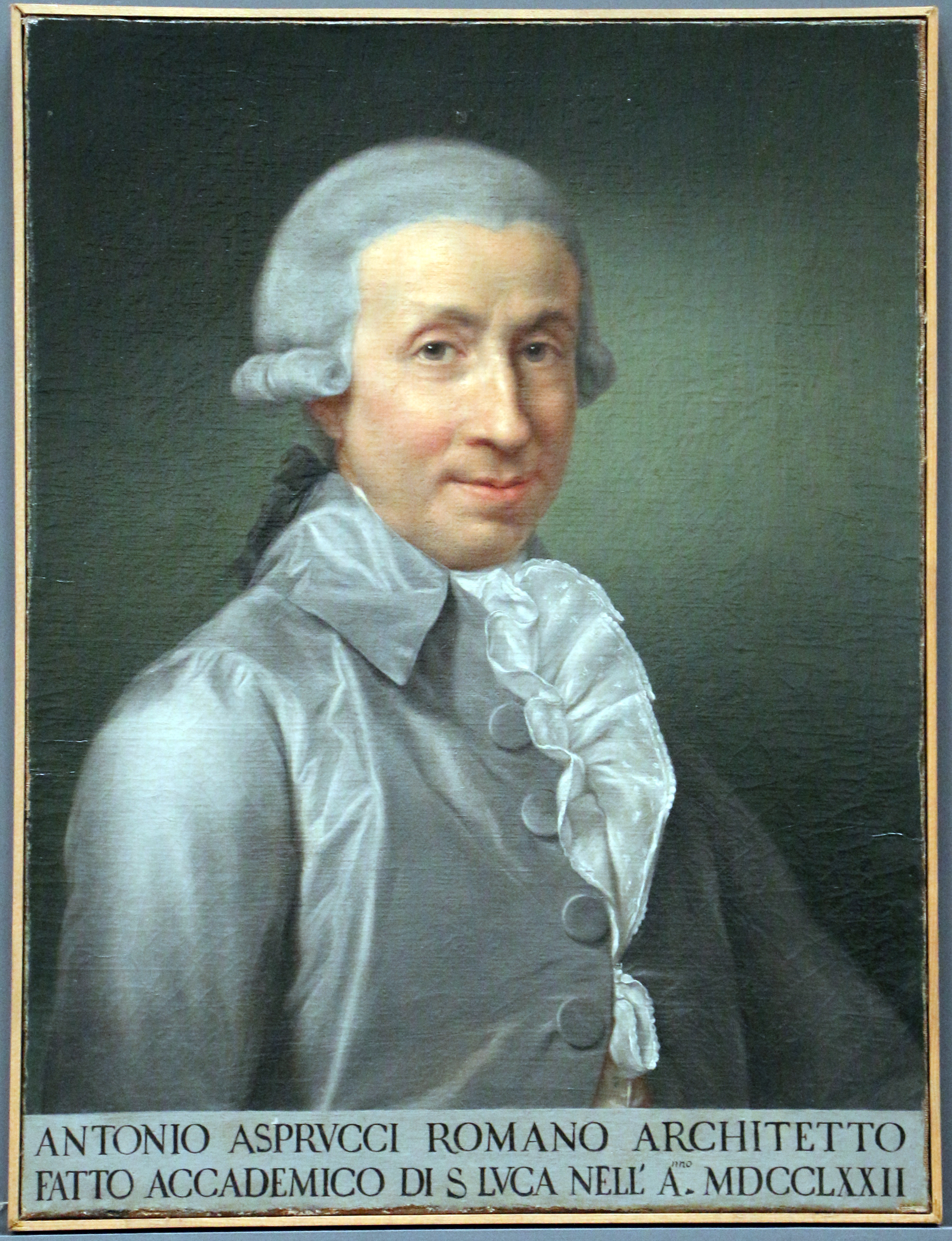
- Portrait of Antonio Asprucci by Anton von Maron
- Born: 20 May 1723; Rome, Papal States
- Died: 14 February 1808 (aged 84); Rome, Papal States
- Known for: Architecture
- Works: Temple of Aesculapius
- Movement: Neoclassicism

Antonio Asprucci (20 May 1723 – 14 February 1808) was an Italian architect. He was one of the first to introduce Neoclassicism in Rome as an architectural style. Asprucci was a member of the prestigious Academy of San Luca, where he was elected Principe (director) in 1790.

== Biography ==
=== Early life ===
Antonio Asprucci was born in Rome on 20 May 1723. He trained first with his father, the architect Mario Asprucci il vecchio, and then with Nicola Salvi, the creator of the Trevi Fountain, for whom he later worked as an assistant, often supervising such works as the construction of Santa Maria in Gradi, Viterbo (1737), and the extension of the palace of the Duke of Bracciano on Piazza dei Santi Apostoli in Rome. His early projects included the restoration of the monastery of Santa Francesca Romana in Rome and the construction of a monastic building for Santo Stefano in Cacco.

=== Career ===
In 1756 Asprucci was made architect to Francis, Grand Duke of Tuscany, for his Roman buildings, directing restorations at the Villa Medici from 1757 to 1762. In the same year he also became architect to Marcantonio IV Borghese, a wealthy, powerful nobleman and patron of the arts. He built a house at Pratica di Mare and remodelled the gallery of the Palazzo Borghese in Rome. His major undertaking for Marcantonio IV, also in Rome, was the reworking of the casino and gardens of the Villa Borghese into a Neoclassical ‘display-case’ for the Borghese art collection.

=== Villa Borghese ===
From the 1770s to the 1790s, Asprucci worked on many projects for the Villa Borghese. During the extensive remodelling of the Villa, Asprucci was both architect and administrator, directing a large group of Rome's leading artists, including such painters as Mariano Rossi and Gavin Hamilton and such sculptors as Vincenzo Pacetti, as well as stuccoists and masons. Painted and marble ornament covered the floors, walls and vaults of the casino. The decorative programme was designed to complement the sculpture and paintings assembled in each room; for example the Egyptian Room was decorated with hieroglyph panels and red and grey marble wall cladding, and housed Egyptian and Roman statues in porphyry and granite. The hall, which Asprucci believed to be his most successful design, reflected the contemporary trend for displaying Egyptian works in a separate room within a collection of antique sculpture. Current Roman taste was also manifested in the combination of Rococo and Neoclassical motifs in the decorative scheme for the casino. In the Hall of the Emperors, where antique busts of Roman emperors and Bernini’s Pluto and Persephone were displayed, Asprucci inserted such Rococo elements as garland-bearing putti over the doors and grotesques in the vault painting into a classicizing articulation of vertical and horizontal elements.

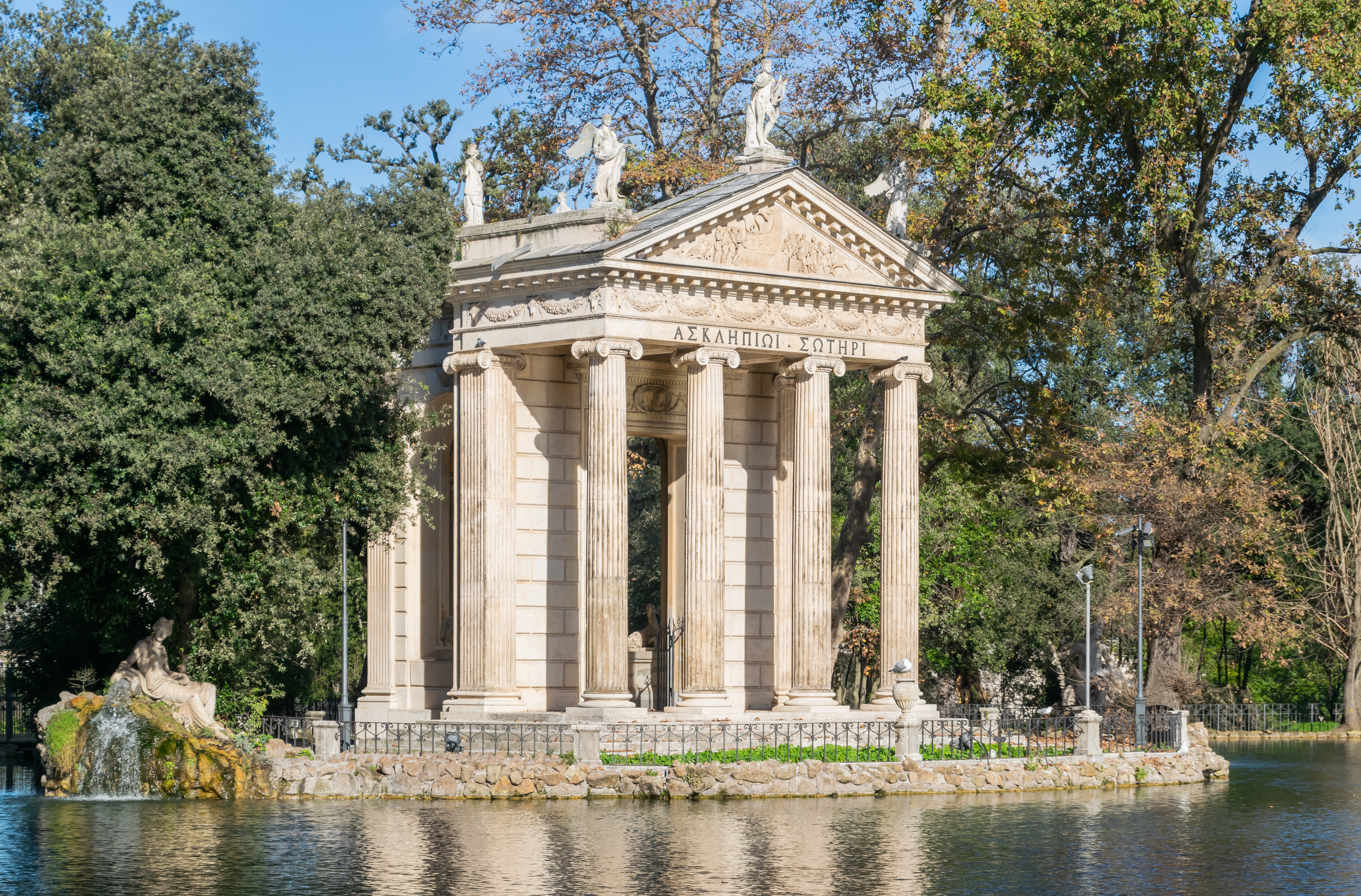
The Temple of Aesculapius, Villa Borghese

Every detail of the remodelling and reorganization of the art collection attracted Asprucci's attention, including designing the fireplaces and furniture to harmonize with the decorative programme. Asprucci and his son Mario Asprucci (1764–1804) worked on the surrounding gardens throughout the 1780s and 1790s, dismantling the walls that divided the three sections of the villa, together with some 17th-century structures, to make way for new constructions within a large park setting. The two architects established the new garden structures as focal points within a grid pattern of avenues. The circular Temple of Diana, the oval circus of the Piazza di Siena on which they sited a chapel fronted by a porch of Doric columns, the false ruins of the Temple of Faustina and the Temple of Aesculapius, a small neoclassical building with a tetrastyle ionic portico picturesquely situated on an island in a manmade lake, form a catalogue of Neoclassical garden architecture. In the Giardino del Lago around the Temple of Aesculapius, the Aspruccis created the first example of the English landscape garden in Rome.

=== Later work ===
The Villa Borghese was Asprucci's most important work, and the decorative campaign, combining latent Rococo motifs with elegant Neoclassical ornamentation, was the most extensive and significant of the late 18th century in Rome. In 1790 Asprucci remodelled the seat of the Accademia di San Luca in Rome, of which he became president (1790–92), and in 1792 he designed the high altar of San Salvatore in Lauro. He served the government of Rome as Sotto Maestro delle Strade for the Trevi area (1795) and the Campo Marzio region (1796). He died in Rome on 14 February 1808. Asprucci's son, Mario, was commissioned to design the classical villa Ickworth House in the Suffolk countryside in 1795.

== Gallery ==
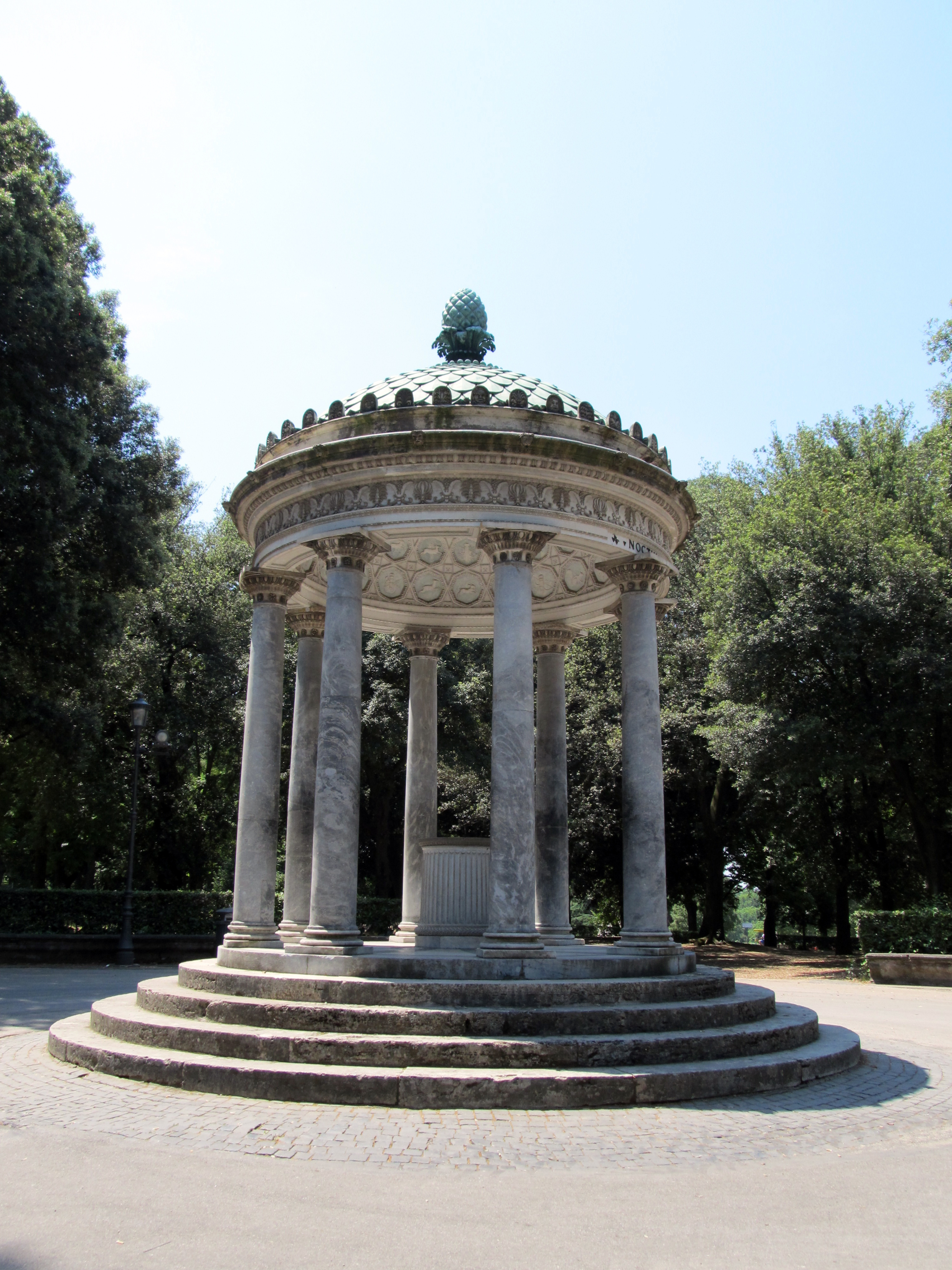
Temple of Diana, Villa Borghese

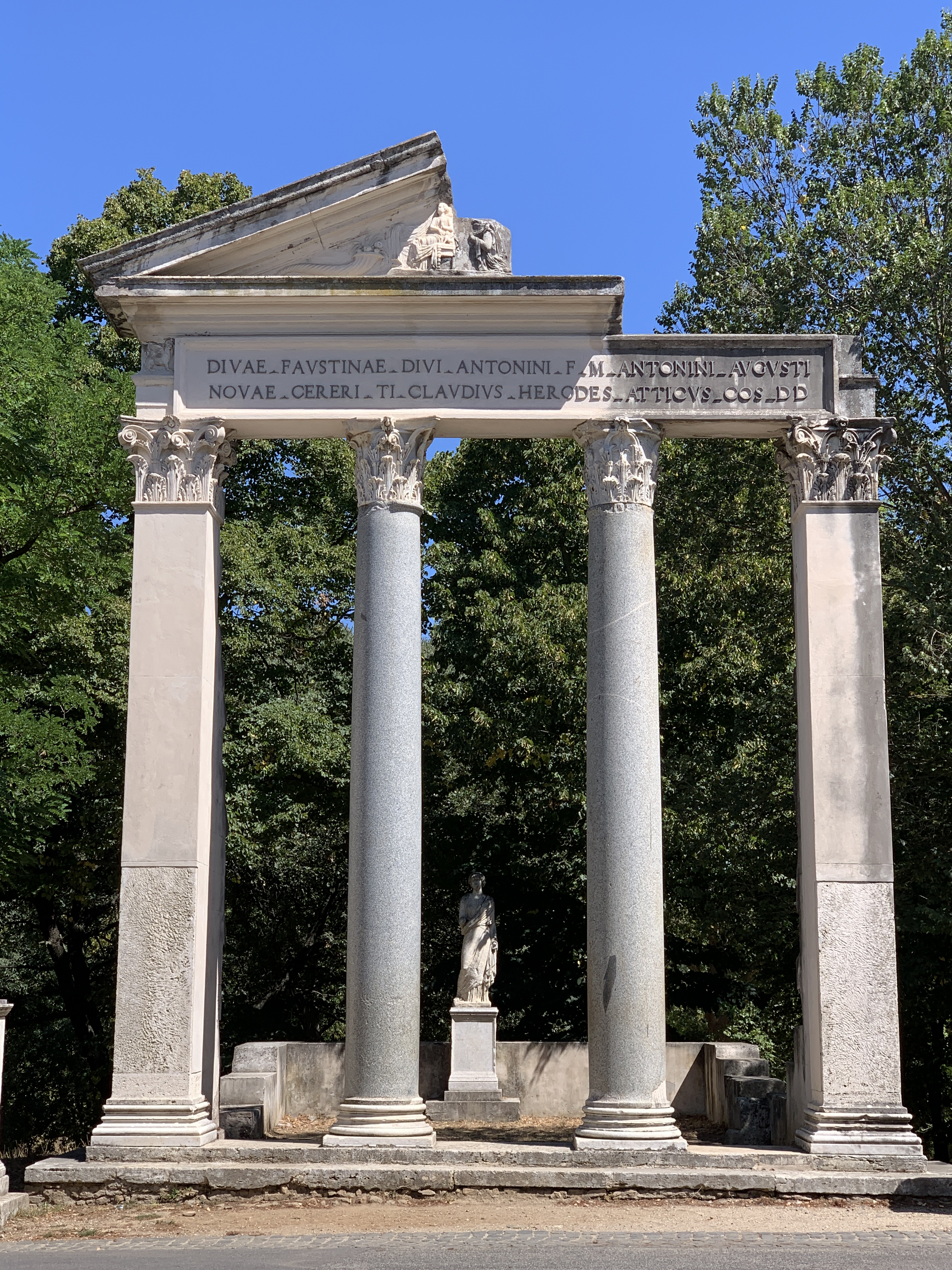
Temple of Antoninus and Faustina, Villa Borghese

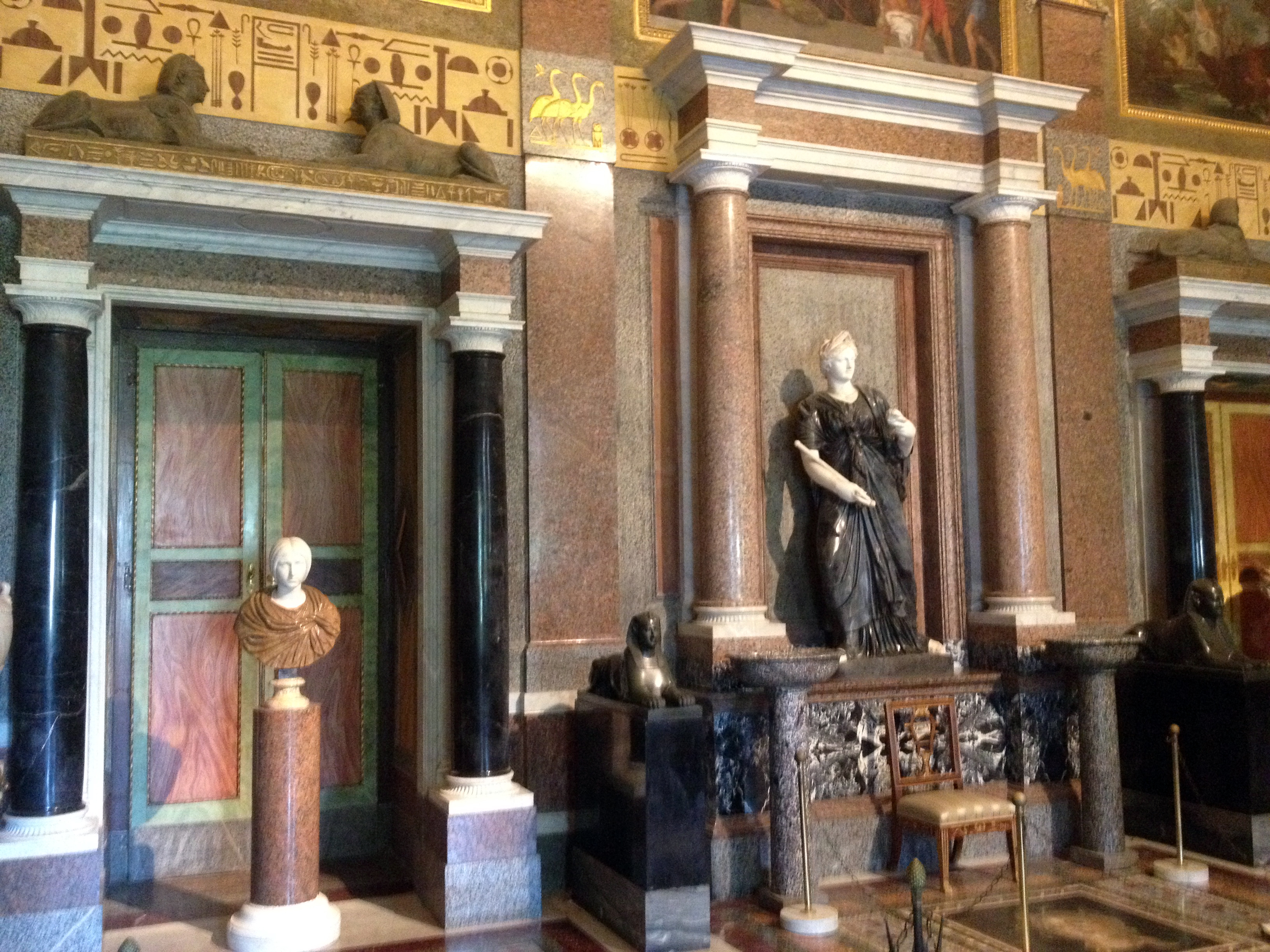
Egyptian Room, Villa Borghese

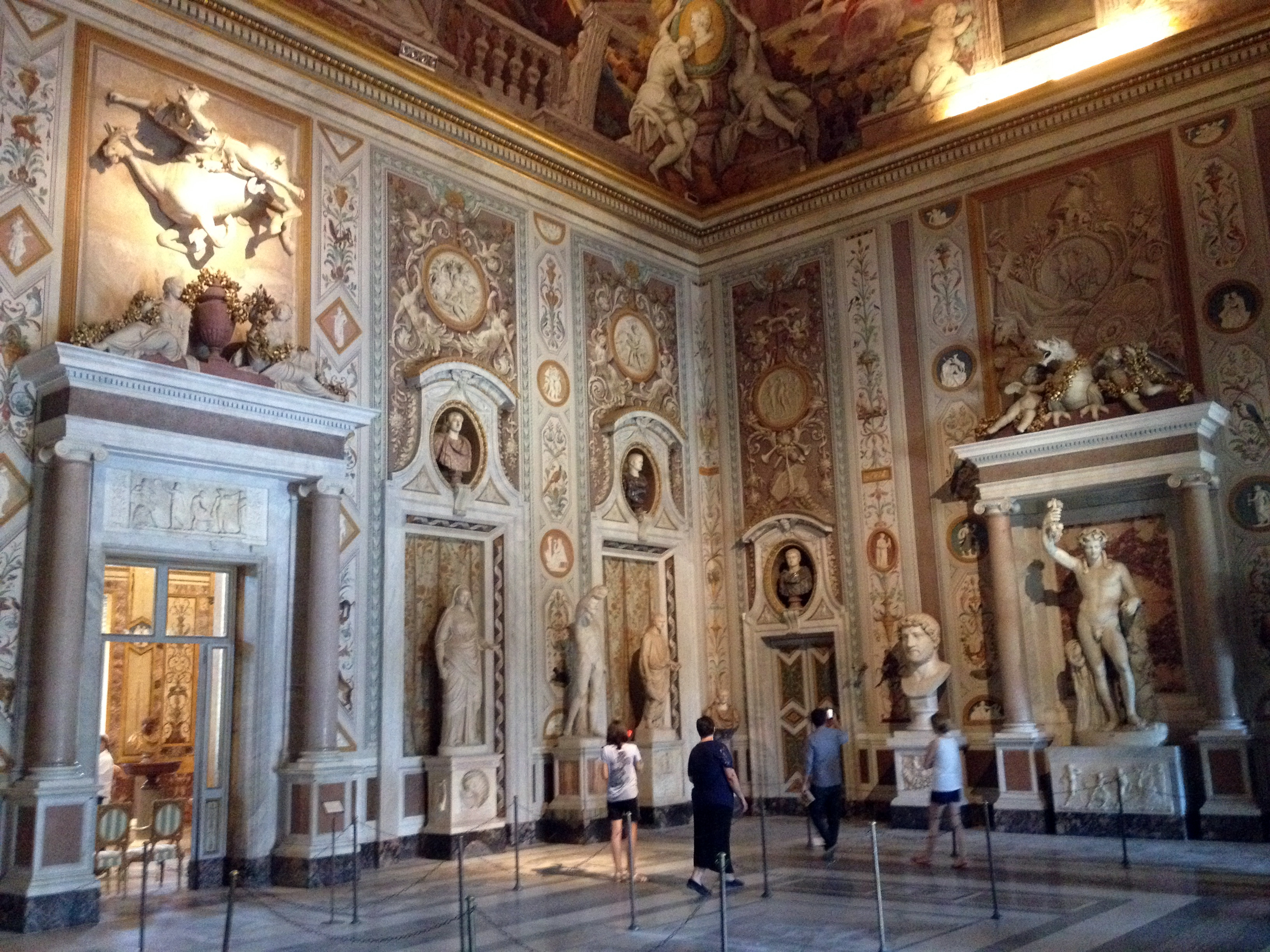
Salon Mariano Rossi, Villa Borghese
