= Girolamo Massei =

Italian painter

Girolamo Massei (c. 1545 – c. 1625) was an Italian Mannerist painter active mostly in Rome.

Born in Lucca, Massei moved to Rome as a young man. Massei was one of the large team of painters engaged during the papacy of Gregory XIII in painting the ceiling of the Galleria Geografica.

He also painted frescoes of the Life and Miracles of San Francis of Paola for the cloister of Trinità dei Monti in the Pincio. He painted an oil altarpiece for the chapel of the Compagnia del Carmine in the church of San Martino ai Monti. He painted an altarpiece with St Sebastian with Saints for the church of San Luigi de' Francesi. He painted life of Galla for Santa Maria in Portico. He painted a Virgin with Child and Saints in oil for Sant'Andrea delle Fratte. He painted a Jesus before Caiphas for Santa Prassede. He returned to Lucca late in life, where he died.
