= Liceo artistico =

Liceo artistico (lit. 'artistic lyceum') is a type of secondary school in Italy. It is designed to give students the skills to progress to any university or higher educational institution, but specifically devoted to art related topics. Students can attend the liceo artistico after successfully completing scuola media (middle school).

The program is devised by the Ministry of Education, and emphasises the link between art and art history. It covers a complete and widespread range of disciplines.

Beside the teaching of subjects characteristic of a high school (e.g. literature, history, mathematics, physics, foreign language, sciences), artistic lyceum provide a deepening teaching of subjects related to fine, applied and visual arts (e.g. painting, sculpture, architecture, design, graphics, scenography, audiovisual, art history and philosophy). Due to its strong conceptual, historical and literary components regarding the Fine Arts is an educational institution considered humanistic, which offers a remarkable training and cultural knowledge that allow pupils to enroll into both, Art Academies to gain related Master degrees, and/or Universities.

Students typically study for five years and attend the school from the age of 14 to 19. At the end of the fifth year, all students sit for the esame di Stato ("state exam"). It is a final examination which gives access to all the university degrees.

A student attending a liceo is called "liceale", although the more generic terms studente (male) and studentessa (female) are also in common use. Teachers are known as professore (male) or professoressa (female).

== See also ==
- List of schools in Italy
