= Villa Borghese Pinciana =

Palazzo in Rome

Coordinates: 41°54′51″N 12°29′32″E

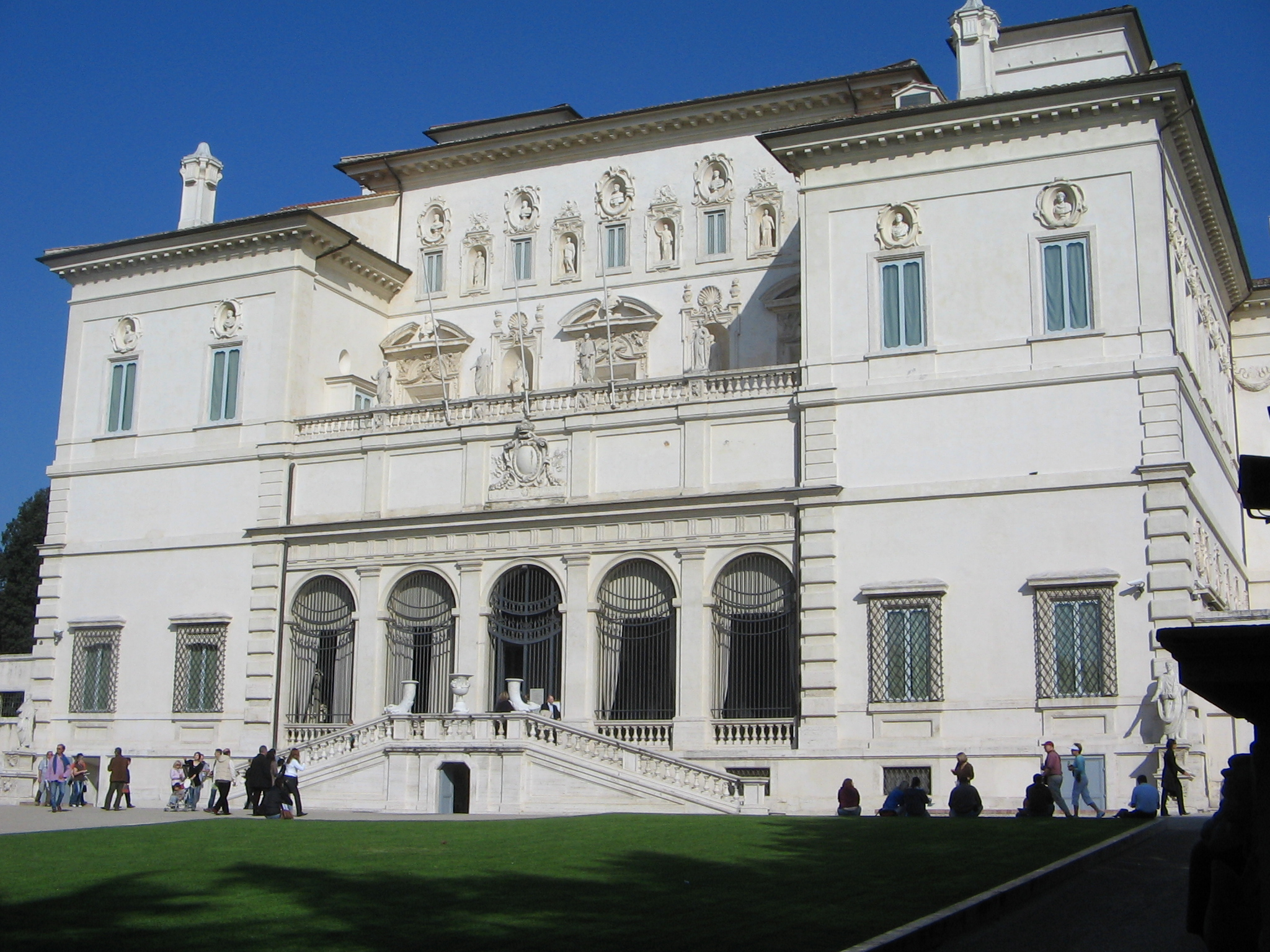
The Villa Borghese Pinciana, Rome, houses the Galleria Borghese.

Villa Borghese Pinciana ('Borghese villa on the Pincian Hill') is a villa built by the architect Flaminio Ponzio (and, after his death, finished by his assistant Giovanni Vasanzio), developing sketches by Scipione Borghese.

== History ==
Borghese was a maternal nephew of Pope Paul V. He wielded enormous power as the Pope's secretary and effective head of the Vatican government, and became very wealthy. In 1607, he began construction of a villa on the Pincian Hill just north of the Pincian Gate in Rome.

The work was begun by architect Flaminio Ponzio, who had recently worked on the Palazzo Borghese. Upon Ponzio's death in 1613, the work was continued by his assistant Giovanni Vasanzio, who designed the facade. The portico had spolia derived from the Arch of Claudius, once on the Via Flaminia. The two-story central hall was known as the Salone.

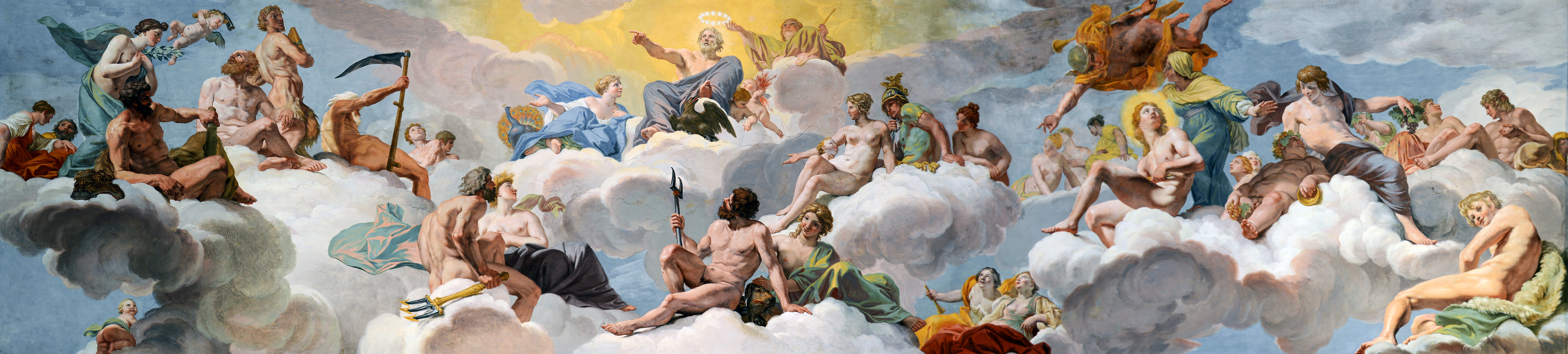
"Council of the Gods", Ceiling in Villa Borghese Pinciana

The Casino Nobile was less a residence than a retreat for Borghese and his uncle to escape the summer heat of the city and to host receptions for dignitaries. It was also a semi-public museum to house his art collection, including sculptures commissioned from Gian Lorenzo Bernini. Borghese entertained guests in the open loggia on the second floor, where Giovanni Lanfranco painted a large ceiling fresco in quadratura The Gods of Olympus also called Council of the Gods.

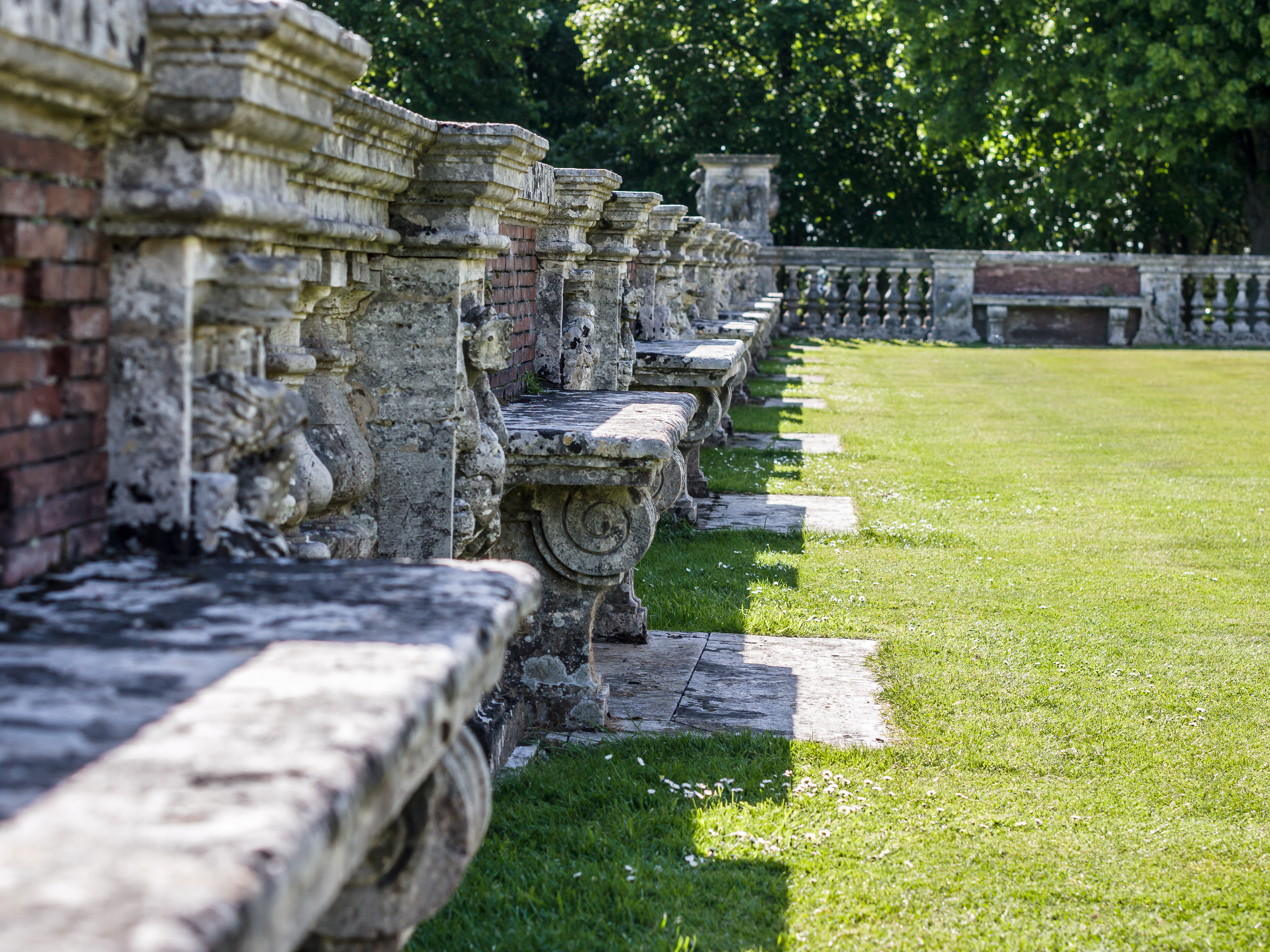
Stone benches, Borghese Balustrade

The Borghese Balustrade was crafted by G di Gincome and P. Massoni in 1618 for the south forecourt of the Casino Nobile. At the center opening there were two stone statues on top and fountains with shell-shaped basins below. The statues were a later addition from 1715 by Claude-Augustin Cayot. In 1896, William Waldorf Astor, former U.S. Minister to Italy, purchased the balustrade and had it installed at his English estate Cliveden. It is a Grade II Listed Building.

Around 1770, Marcantonio Borghese, 5th Prince of Sulmona began recreating the villa as a museum. Old tapestry and leather hangings were removed, new ceiling decorations commissioned and the Casina renovated, according to designs by Antonio Asprucci and his son Mario. Much of the sculpted decorations were done by Vincenzo Pacetti.

The Galleria Borghese now occupies the villa, and the Villa Borghese gardens surround the villa.

Other villas held by the Borghese family may also be known as Villa Borghese.
