= Piazza Borghese =

Square in Rome, Italy

- City square
- {{{other_names}}}
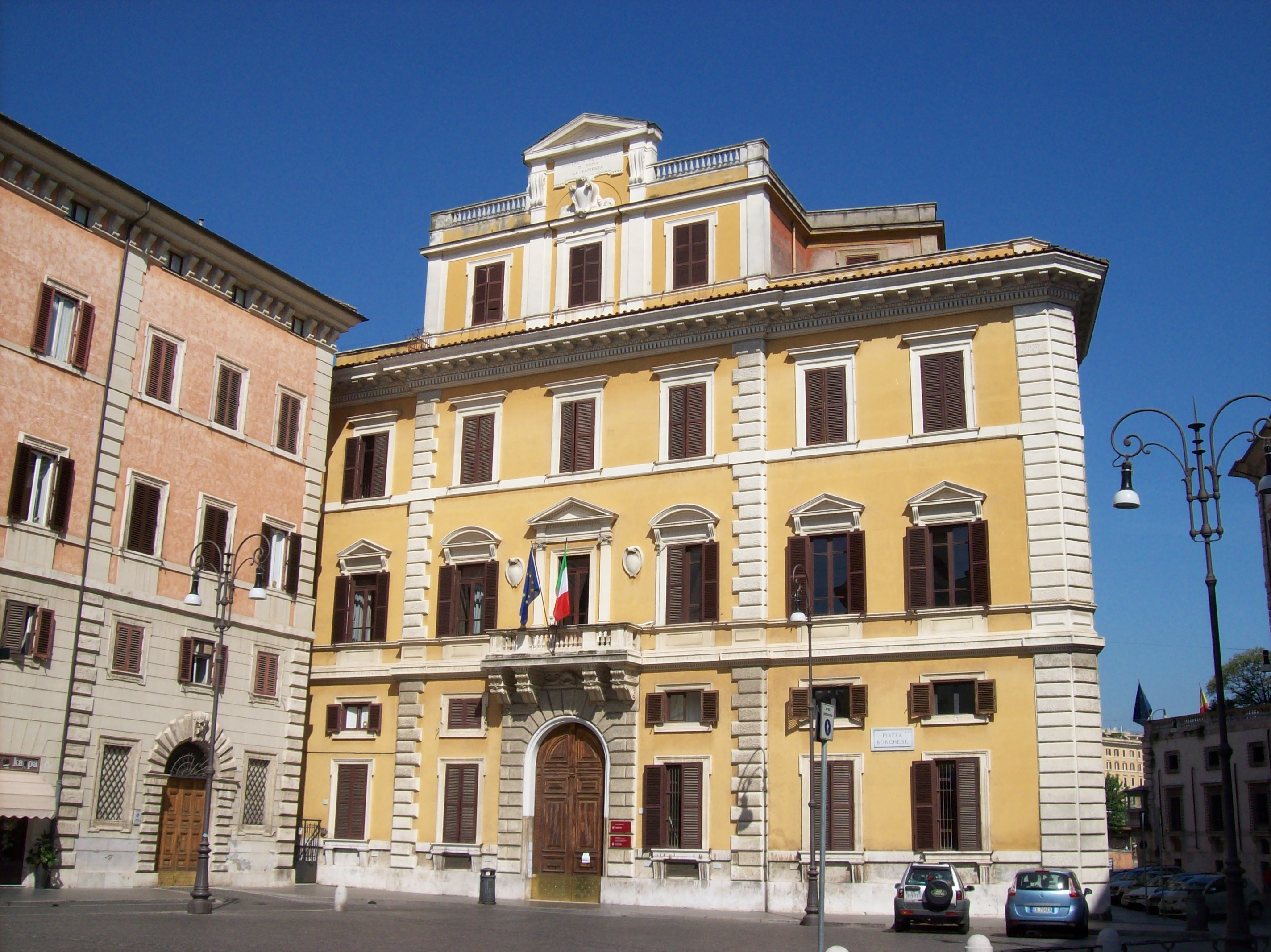
- Piazza Borghese. In front, the seat of the Architecture Department; on the left, Palazzo Borghese
- Location: Rome, Italy
- Interactive map of Piazza Borghese
- Coordinates: 41°54′14″N 12°28′34″E

Piazza Borghese is one of the squares in the historic centre of Rome (Italy), in the rione Campo Marzio.

== The square ==
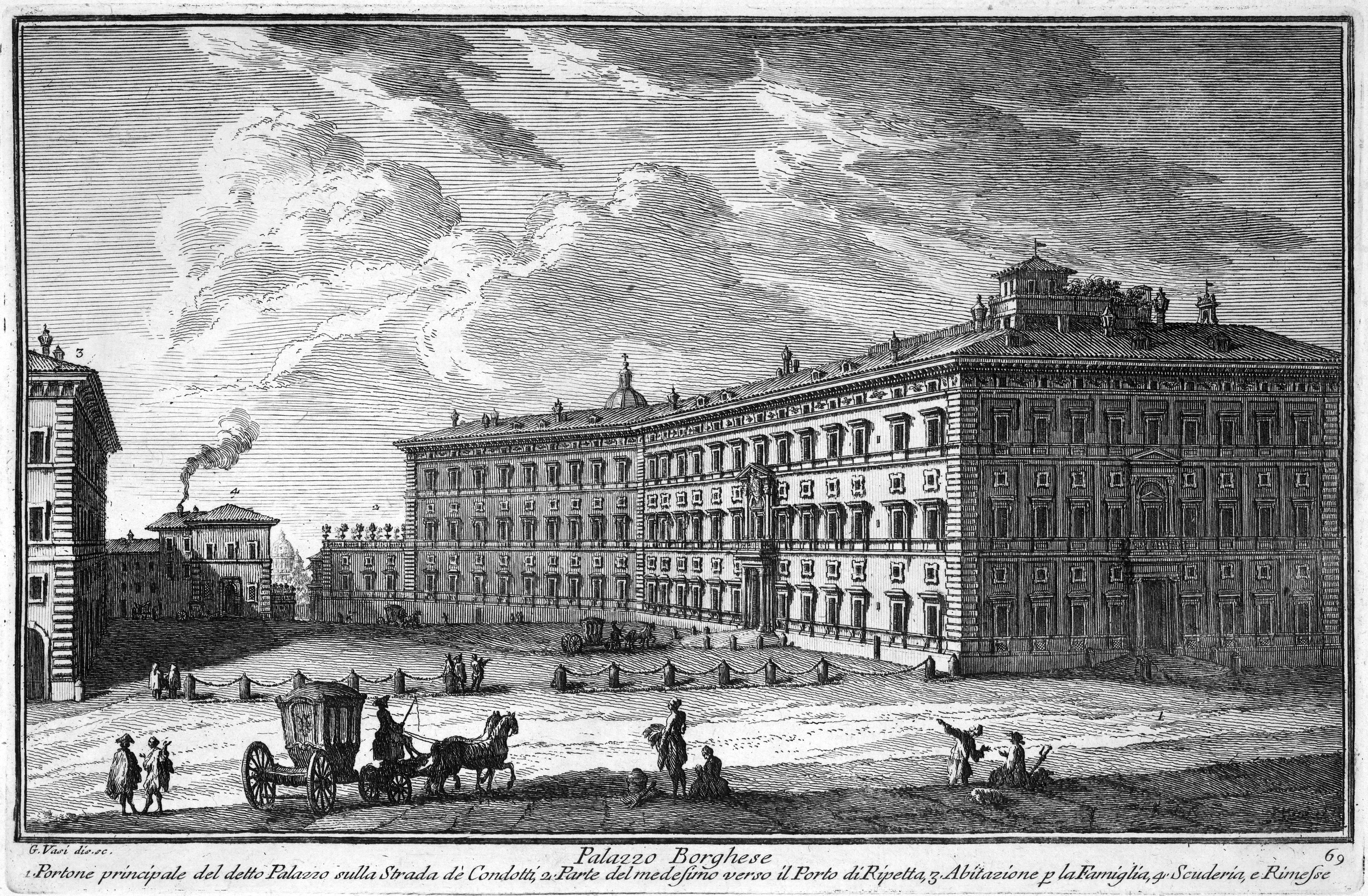
The square in an 18th-century print

The square lies between Via di Ripetta and Via Fontanella Borghese, in an area owned for centuries by the Borghese family. It is delimited by Palazzo Borghese at north-east, by the Palazzo della Facoltà di Architettura at north-west and by the so-called Palazzo della Famiglia at south-west.

The Borgheses settled in the area in the 16th century. Under Pope Paul V (1605–1621) and cardinal Scipione Borghese, they expanded into the area between Via di Ripetta and the church of Saint Jerome of the Croats. The square was a private space adjacent to the family's palace until the 19th century.

The square formerly overlooked Via di Ripetta, but between 1923 and 1928 that side was closed by the palace that now hosts one of the seats of the Architecture Department of the Sapienza University.

== Monuments and interesting places ==
- Museum of the Ara Pacis
- Church of Saint Jerome of the Croats
