= Villa Torlonia, Frascati =

Villa in Frascati, Italy

Coordinates: 41°48′12″N 12°40′46″E

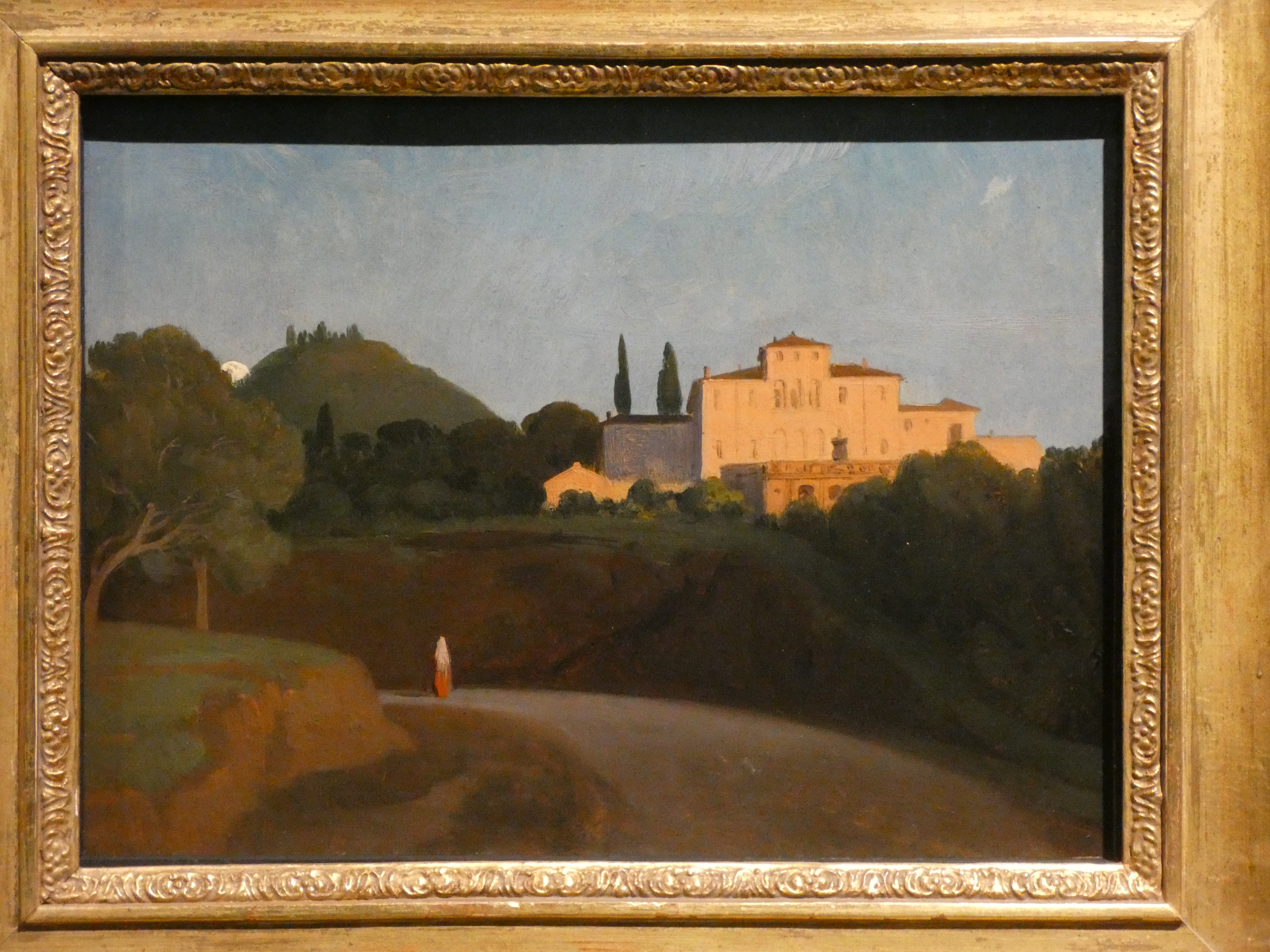
Paul Flandrin, View of the Villa Torlonia Frascati at Dusk, 1837

Stairways and Villa Torlonia, photochrome print

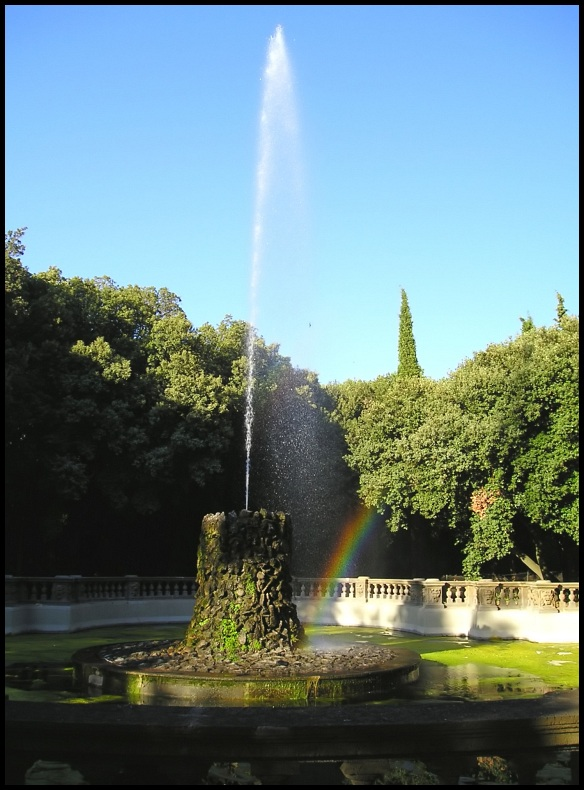
Upper Fountain, Villa Torlonia, Frascati.

The Villa Torlonia in Frascati was a villa belonging to the Torlonia family in Frascati, Italy. The gardens have long been famous, and after bombing in World War II are now all that survive, mostly as a public park.

== History ==
The land on which the villa was built originally belonged to the Territorial Abbacy of Saint Mary of Grottaferrata, which donated it in 1563 to Annibal Caro, who commissioned a small villa where he spent the last years of his life, translating the Aeneid. In 1896, Prince Leopoldo Torlonia placed a memorial stone to remember this event.

In 1571, Beatrice Cenci bought the villa, which passed in 1596 to Cardinal Tolomeo Galli, Secretary of State under Pope Gregory XIII, who commissioned the first enlargement.

In 1607, Cardinal Scipione Borghese, Paul V's nephew, took possession of the Villa; he enlarged and embellished it. The waterworks used to feed the fountains of the Villa and the spectacular Water Theatre with a water flight of steps, date to 1607-25, designed and directed by Girolamo Fontana, Carlo Maderno and Flaminio Ponzio and completed at the base with a large retaining wall with niches and fountains.

Other 17th and 18th-century owners were the Cardinal Ludovico Ludovisi, the Colonna family, the Conti family, and the Sforza Cesarini family. In the 19th century, the villa was acquired by Prince Torlonia, whose name it commemorates. During the Napoleonic Age, the Torlonias profited by the Holy See's troubles and amassed a fortune by speculative transactions. Besides, they acquired titles and redeemed their plebeian extraction.

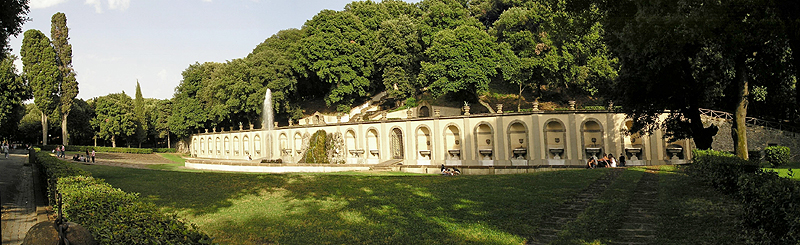
Water Theatre, by Carlo Maderno, 1607-25.

The villa's grand Baroque terraced gardens and fountains provided subjects for the American painter John Singer Sargent and others.

The old Villa was almost completely destroyed on September 8, 1943, when Frascati was bombed. During that period, it housed the court martial and SS detachment. After that, numerous partisans from the Alban Hills (Castelli Romani) area were transferred here and killed.

In 1954, the Duke Andrea Torlonia made an exchange of real property with mayor Micara of Frascati between the "Gardens" of Villa Torlonia and the "Quadrato estate"; now the gardens are a public park.

== Sources ==
- Wells, Clara Louisa (1878). The Alban Hills. Vol. I. Frascati, by Clara L. Wells. Barbera. OCLC 21996251.
