= Cembalo =

Cembalo is the term for the harpsichord in German and some other European languages (‘clavicembalo’ in Italian). It may also refer to:

- Balaklava, a neighborhood of Sevastopol, Crimea, known as Cembalo until 1475
- Il cembalo, a nickname for the Palazzo Borghese, Rome

== See also ==
- Cimbalom
