= Flaminio Ponzio =

Italian architect (1560–1613)

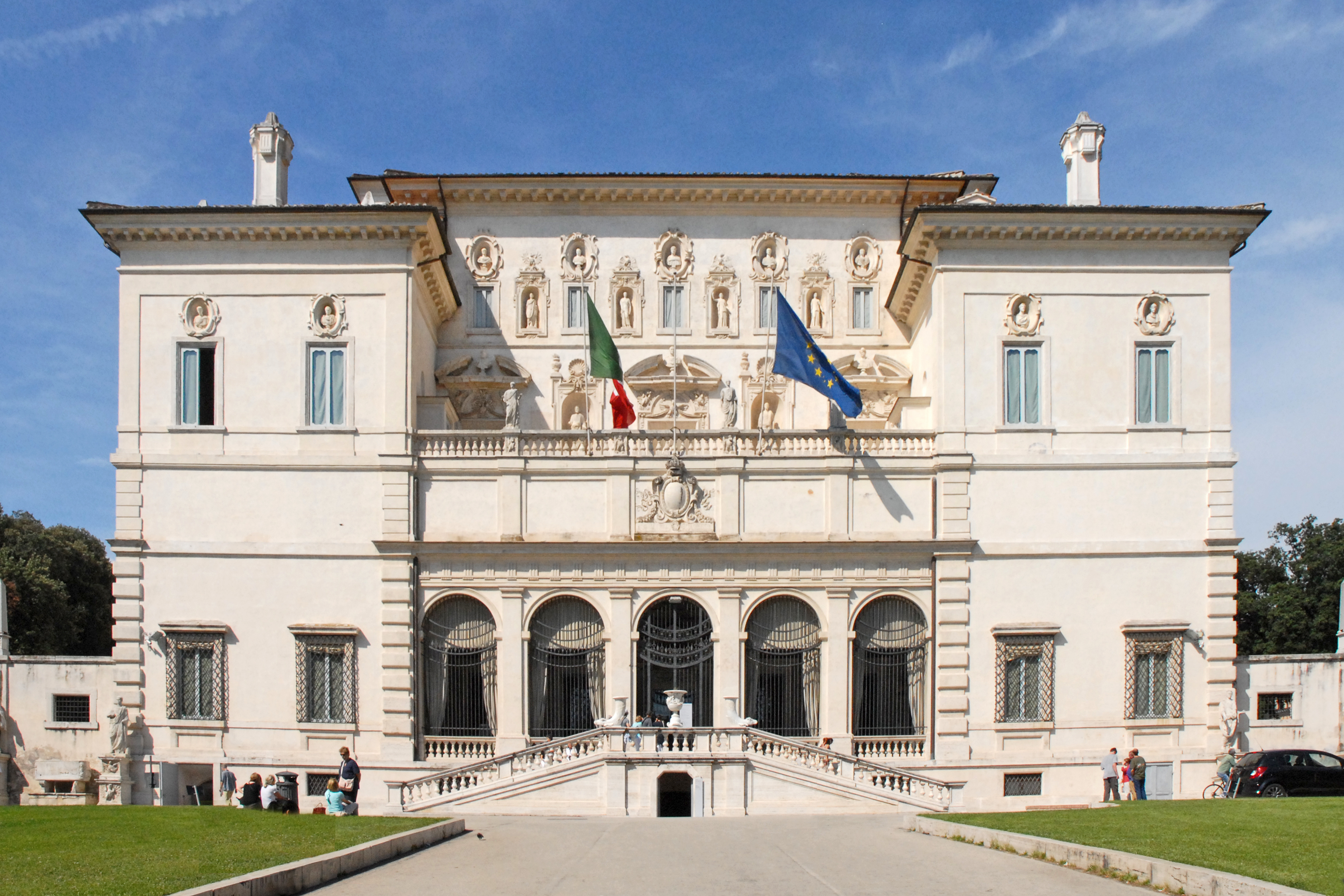
erected in 1613, the villa Pinciana (now the Villa Borghese) built by Flaminio Ponzio and his assistant Giovanni Vasanzio

Flaminio Ponzio (1560–1613) was an Italian architect during the late-Renaissance or so-called Mannerist period, serving in Rome as the architect for Pope Paul V.

Ponzio was born in Viggiù near Varese, and he died in Rome. After juvenile training in Milan, he moved to Rome, where he worked briefly with Domenico Fontana.

== Selected works ==
- Design of the Cappella Paolina (Chapel of Paul V) in Santa Maria Maggiore (1605-1611)
- Façade on Via Ripetta of Palazzo Borghese (1605-1607)
- Oratories of Saint Barbara and Saint Silvia on the Caelian Hill near San Gregorio Magno al Celio (1608)
- Villa Borghese Pinciana or ("Borghese villa on the Pincian Hill"; 1609–1613), also referred to as the Casino Nobile on the site, which presently is the suburban villa hosting the museum known as the Galleria Borghese. Originally commissioned by the rapacious patron of arts, Scipione Borghese, who appears to have played a role in the design. He likely played a role in the design of the gardens and grounds surrounding the villa, and collaborated or was supplanted after his death by Vasanzio (Jan Van Santen).
- Casa di Flaminio Ponzio (1610)
- Fountain of the Acqua Paola on the Janiculum (1610)
- Restoration and creation of new cupola, for the church of Sant'Eligio degli Orefici
- Design of San Sebastiano and of Palazzo Rospigliosi in Quirinal Hill, both completed by Giovanni Vasanzio (1612)
- Palazzo Sciarra (1613)
- Villa Torlonia in Frascati

== Sources ==
- Web Gallery of Art biography
- Biography
