= Palazzo Sciarra =

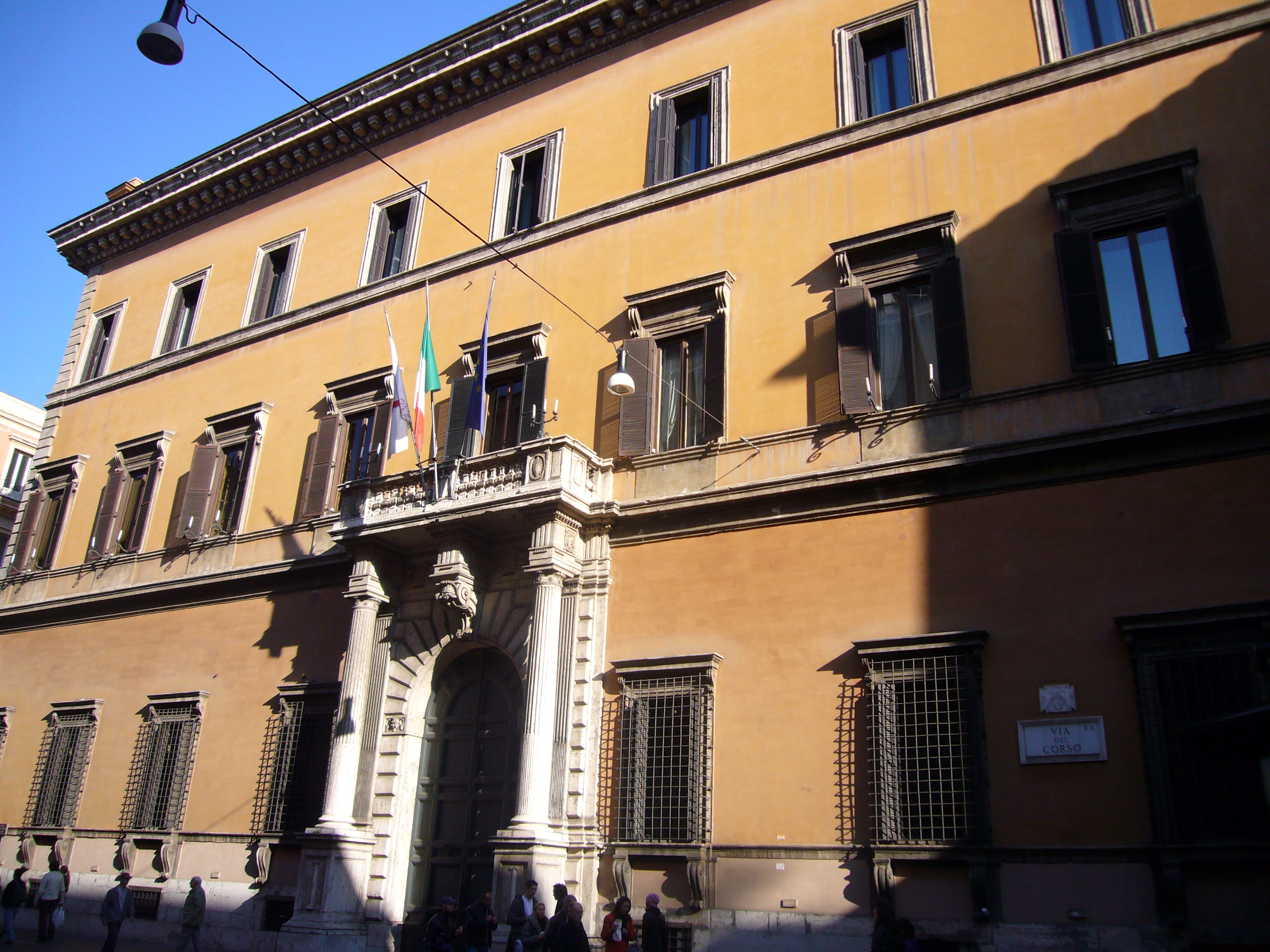
- Rome, Palazzo Sciarra Colonna in via del Corso (Facade of Flaminio Ponzio)
- Interactive map of the Palazzo Sciarra area

General information
- Location: Rome, Italy

The Palazzo Sciarra is a palace built by a branch of the Colonna family, with the main facade located on the Via del Corso #239 in Rione Colonna in central Rome. It presently houses the headquarters of Fondazione Roma.

== History ==
By the 17th century, the Sciarra branch of the Colonna family owned two buildings at the site. The architect Flaminio Ponzio was engaged in 1610 to fuse the buildings together. The work was continued in 1641 by Orazio Torrioni, who completed the main facade. In the 18th-century, under the patronage of Cardinal Prospero Colonna, the architect Luigi Vanvitelli, refurbished the palace. The frescoed rooms in the palace were completed in this refurbishment.

Further additions to the palace occurred in the late 19th-century under Francesco Settimi. The palace was altered between 1871 and 1898, when Prince Maffeo Sciarra commissioned Giulio de Angelis to shorten the wing to widen Via Minghetti and to build the Quirino theater and the Sciarra Gallery. The Sciarra Gallery is a glass-domed passage way through an internal courtyard, notable for the frescoed walls of the courtyard. It connects via Marco Minghetti, vicolo Sciarra and piazza dell’Oratorio (Oratorio square). The upper floors' frescoes were painted in Liberty style by Giuseppe Cellini, and depict everyday scenes of the virtues of women, including prudity, sobriety, strength, humility, prudence, patience, goodness, faith, lovable-ness, generous, and lady-like.
