= Statue of Pope Clement X =

Sculpture by Gian Lorenzo Bernini

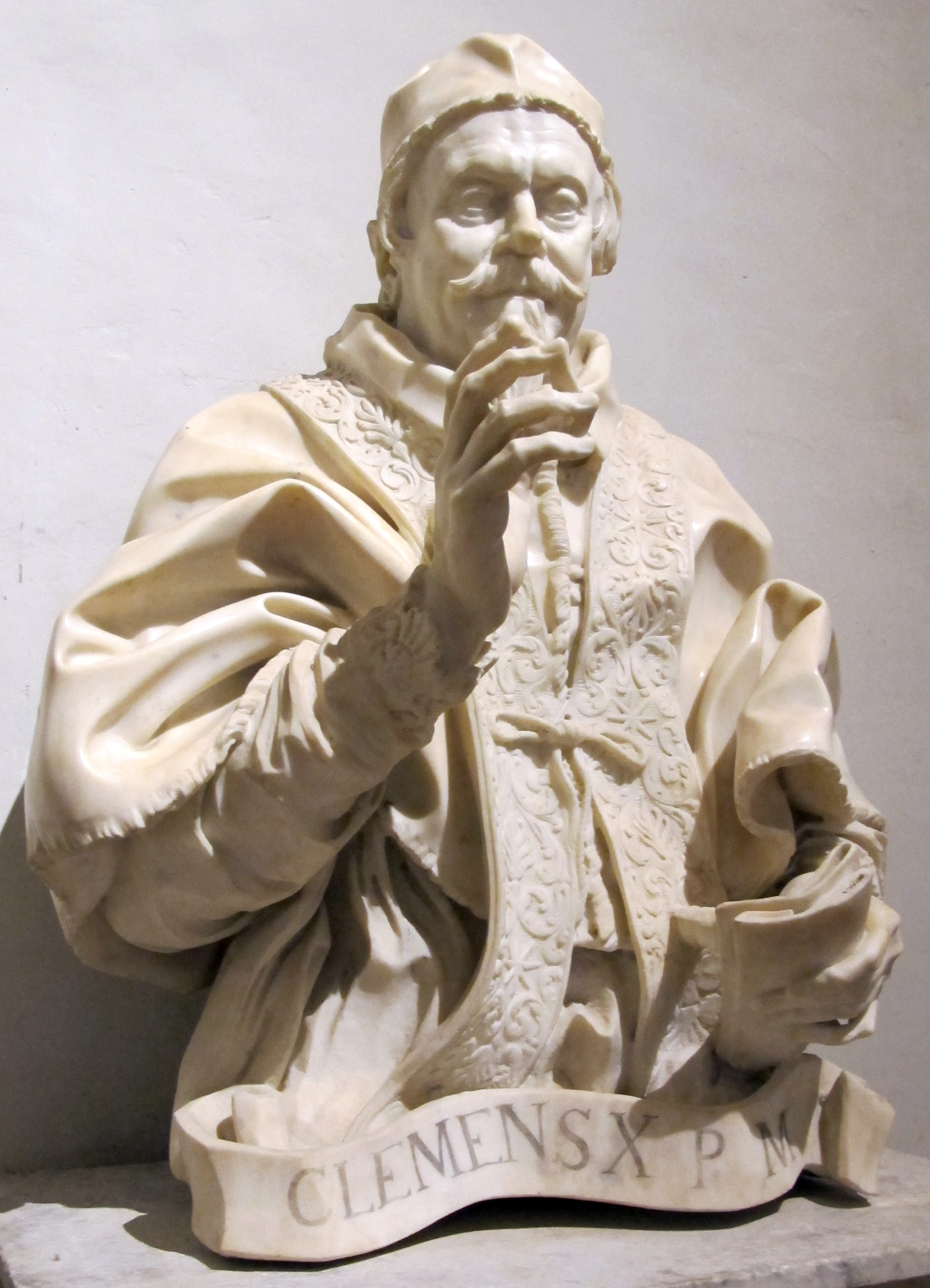
- Artist: Gian Lorenzo Bernini
- Year: 1676
- Catalogue: 78a
- Type: Sculpture
- Medium: Marble
- Subject: Pope Clement X
- Dimensions: 105 cm (41 in)
- Location: Galleria Nazionale d'Arte Antica, Rome; 41°53′46.8″N 12°28′44.5″E
- Preceded by: Tomb of Pope Alexander VII
- Followed by: Bust of the Saviour

The Statue of Pope Clement X is one of the final sculptural works executed by the Italian artist Gian Lorenzo Bernini. It depicts Pope Clement X in the act of benediction, and is housed in the Galleria Nazionale d'Arte Antica in the Palazzo Barberini, Rome.

== Origins ==
There is considerable confusion over the origins of the statue. According to Rudolf Wittkower, there were three versions in production during 1676. One was intended for the pope's nephew Cardinal Paluzzo Altieri, another to be placed the refectory of the church of Santa Trinità dei Convalescenti, and a third for the library of the Palazzo Altieri. Wittkower believed that the last of these is the existing version in the Palazzo Barberini, although E. A. Barletta indicated that it may instead be the version for Santa Trinità dei Convalescenti.

There is also a bronze bust, based on Bernini's designs, of Clement X. This is currently in the Minneapolis Museum of Art, but appears to have been executed earlier than the work in the Palazzo Barberini, in around 1671.

== Exhibitions ==
The statue has appeared in exhibitions at the Getty Museum in California and the National Gallery of Australia in Canberra.

== See also ==
- List of works by Gian Lorenzo Bernini
