= San Sebastiano fuori le mura =

Roman Catholic basilica and landmark in Rome, Italy

- Basilica of Saint Sebastian Outside the Walls
- San Sebastiano ad Catacumbas
- Basilica di San Sebastiano fuori le mura
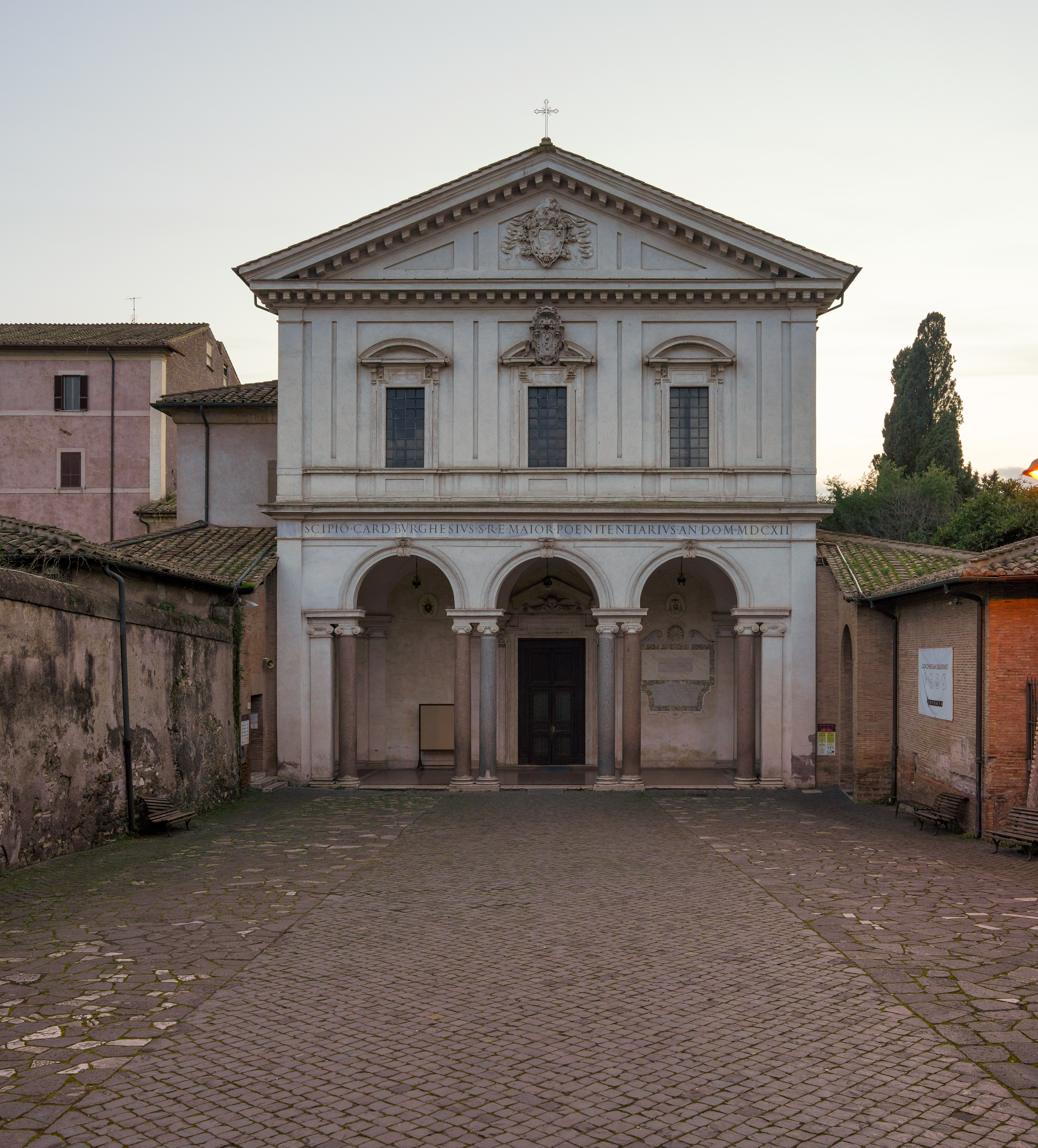
- San Sebastiano fuori le mura, façade (1612) by Flaminio Ponzio, assisted by Giovanni Vasanzio
- Click on the map for a fullscreen view
- 41°51′20″N 12°30′56″E
- Location: Via Appia Antica 136, Rome
- Country: Italy
- Denomination: Catholic
- Tradition: Roman Rite
- Religious order: Franciscan Friars Minor
- Website: sansebastianofuorilemura.org

History
- Status: Minor basilica, titular church
- Founded: c. AD 300–350
- Dedication: Saint Sebastian

Architecture
- Architect(s): Flaminio Ponzio; Giovanni Vasanzio
- Style: Baroque
- Completed: 18th century

Administration
- Diocese: Rome

San Sebastiano fuori le mura (Saint Sebastian outside the Walls), or San Sebastiano ad Catacumbas (Saint Sebastian at the Catacombs), is a minor basilica in Rome, Central Italy. Up to the Great Jubilee of 2000, San Sebastiano was one of the Seven Pilgrim Churches of Rome, and many pilgrims still favour the traditional list (not least perhaps because of the Catacombs and because the Santuario della Madonna del Divino Amore, which replaced it in the list, is farther from the inner city).

The name ad catacumbas refers to the catacombs of St Sebastian, over which the church was built, while "fuori le mura" refers to the fact that the church is built outside the Aurelian Walls, and is used to differentiate the basilica from the church of San Sebastiano al Palatino on the Palatine Hill.

== History ==
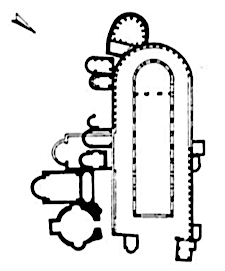
Plan of Constantine's basilica

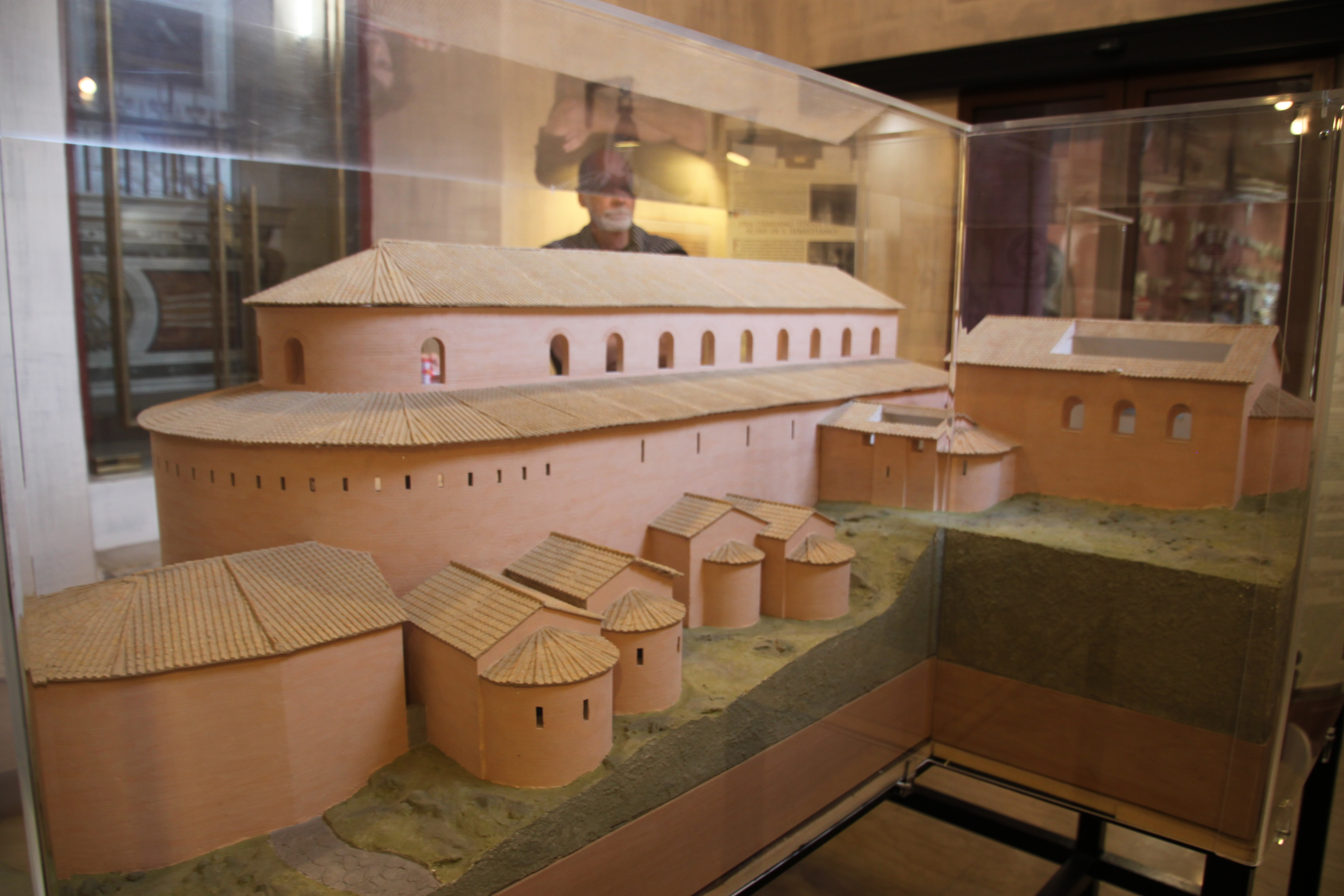
Conjectural model of the original basilica

According to the founding tradition, in 258, during the Valerian persecutions, the catacombs were temporarily used as place of sepulture of two other saints martyred in Rome, Peter and Paul. Therefore the first basilica was built as the Basilica Apostolorum ("Basilica of the Apostles") by Constantine I in the first half of the 4th century. The remains of the apostles were later transferred to the two basilicas carrying their names.

St. Sebastian was a popular Roman martyr of the 3rd century whose remains were moved here in around 350. The dedication of the basilica to Sebastian dates to the 9th century.

His remains were transferred to St. Peter's in 826, fearing a Saracen assault: the latter, in fact, materialised, and the basilica was destroyed. The building was refounded under Pope Nicholas I (858–867), while the martyr's altar was reconsecrated by Honorius III (1216–1227), by request of the Cistercians, who had received the place. In the 13th century the arcade of the triple nave was walled in.

S. Sebastiano is one of the seven basilicas which travellers to Rome traditionally visited, especially after 1553 when St. Philip Neri, initiated the Seven Churches Visitation, a special pilgrimage done in one day starting from St. Peter's Basilica and ending at the Basilica di Santa Maria Maggiore. The street which links Basilica of Saint Paul Outside the Walls with S. Sebastiano is still called "Via delle Sette Chiese".

The current edifice is largely a 17th-century construction, commissioned by Cardinal Scipione Borghese in 1609 from Flaminio Ponzio and, after Ponzio's death in 1613, entrusted to Giovanni Vasanzio, who completed it.

== Overview ==
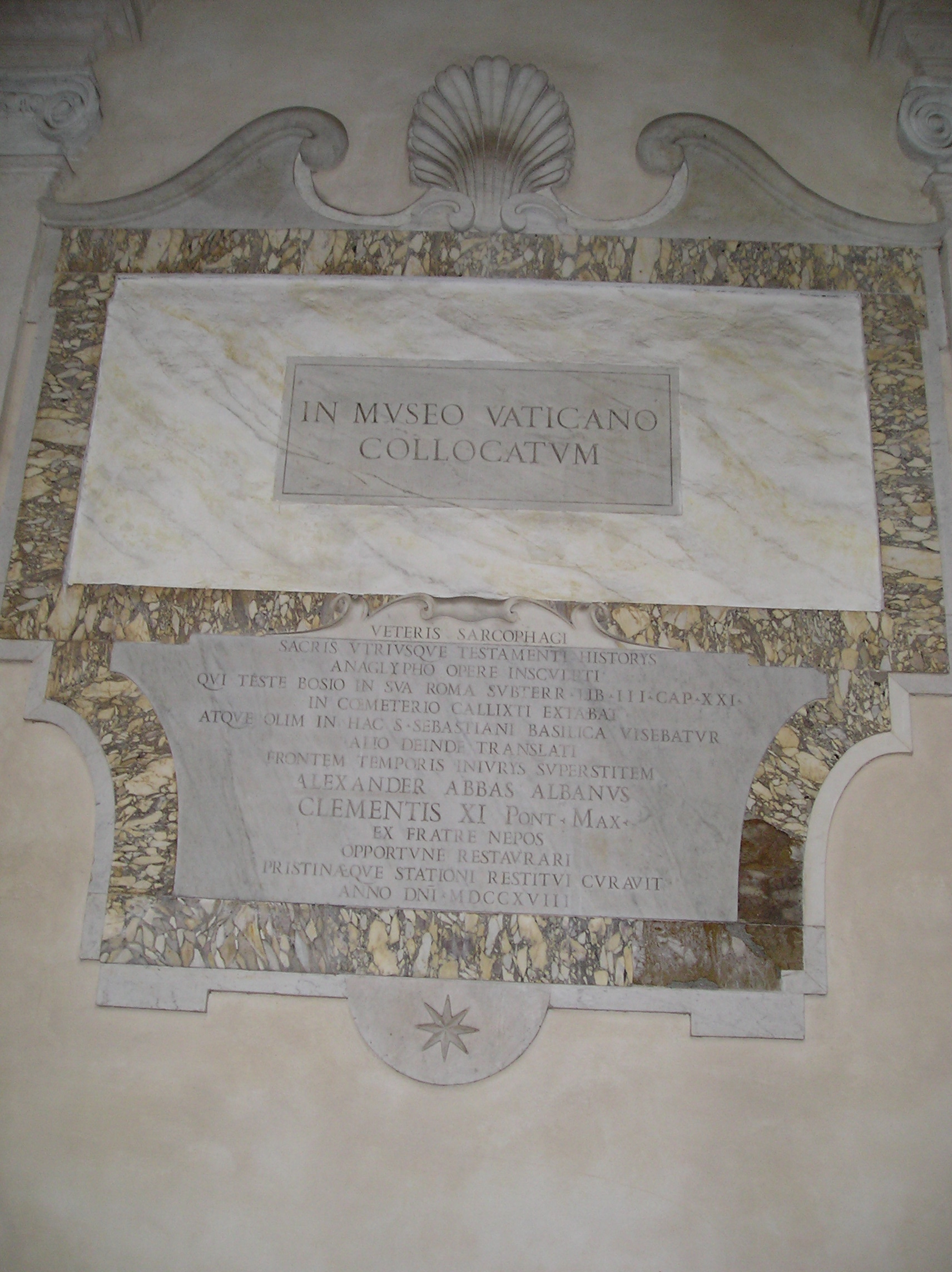
Catacombs of San Sebastiano – entrance detail

The statue of St Sebastian at the altar in the first chapel on the left is by Giuseppe Giorgetti. The Chapel of Relics, located directly across the nave, houses a stone allegedly imprinted with the footprints of Jesus related to the episode of "Quo vadis?" in the apocryphal Acts of Peter; and one of the arrows which struck St Sebastian together with part of the column to which he was tied during the martyrdom. Noteworthy is the Albani Chapel (built 1716) and designed by Carlo Maratta, Alessandro Specchi, Filippo Barigioni and Carlo Fontana; commissioned by Pope Clement XI; and dedicated to Pope Fabian. Fabian had been Bishop of Rome during the persecution of Decius. Flanking the altar, busts of Saints Peter and Paul by Nicolò Cordier recall the first dedication of the basilica.

== Bernini ==
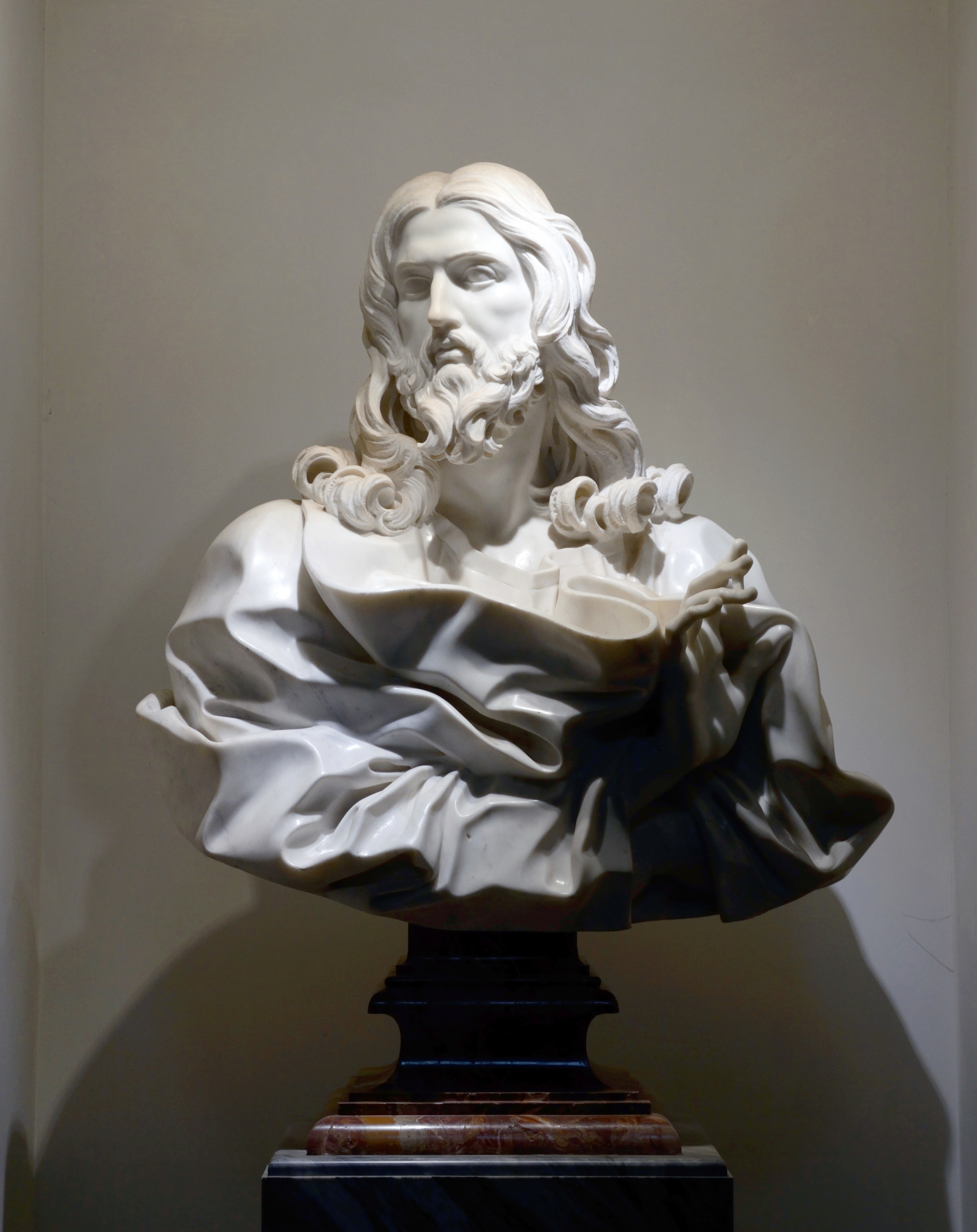
Jesus of Gian Lorenzo Bernini

On the right side in a niche, the famous Bust of the Saviour (Salvator Mundi), the last masterpiece by Gian Lorenzo Bernini rediscovered in 2001 in the convent adjacent to the church, is shown.

== List of Cardinal-Priests ==
- Ildebrando Antoniutti (24 May 1962 - 13 September 1973 appointed cardinal bishop of Velletri)
- Sebastiano Baggio (21 December 1973 - 12 December 1974 appointed cardinal bishop of Velletri)
- Johannes Willebrands (6 December 1975 - 2 August 2006 deceased)
- Lluís Martínez Sistach, since 24 November 2007

== Burials ==
- Quirinus of Sescia
- Pope Fabian

== See also ==
- Santa Maria in Palmis

== Notes ==
Preceded by Sacro Cuore di Gesù a Castro Pretorio	Landmarks of Rome; San Sebastiano fuori le mura	Succeeded by San Silvestro in Capite
