= Sant'Eligio degli Orefici =

Church in Rome, Italy

Coordinates: 41.8957°N 12.468°E

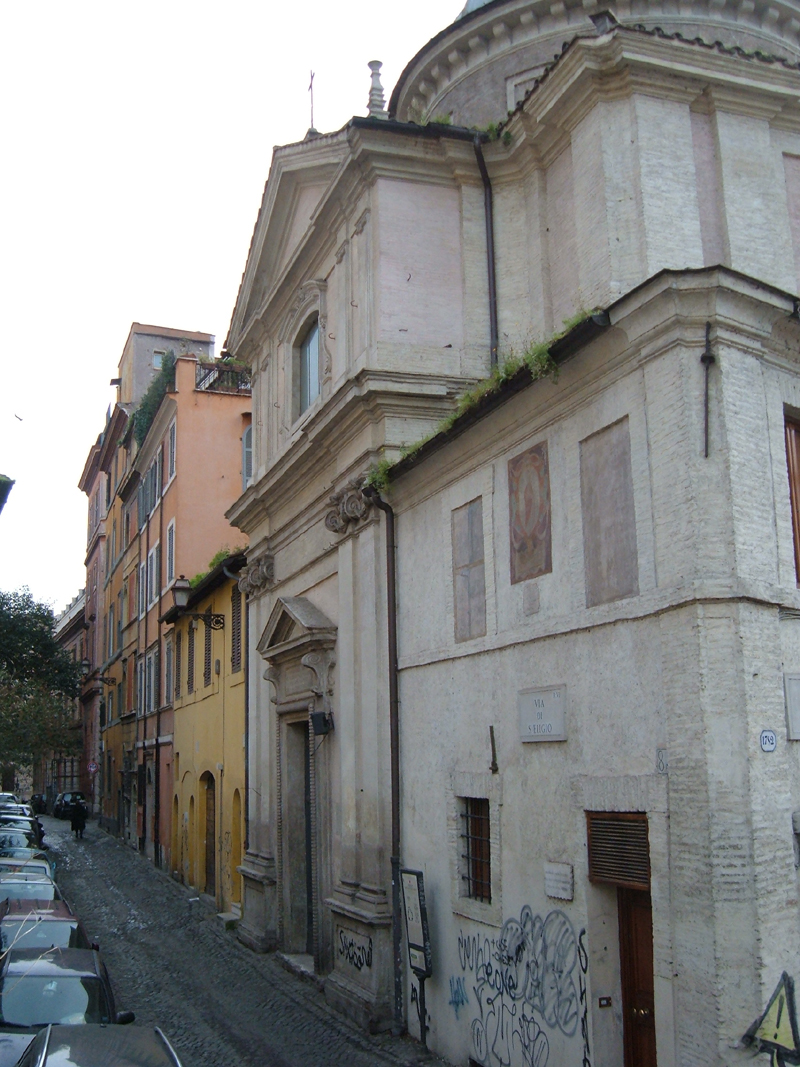
Sant'Eligio degli Orefici

Sant'Eligio degli Orefici is a church in Rome, Italy. It is located in the rione Regola, near via Giulia, on a corner of the via of the same name that ends below the Lungotevere dei Tebaldi, a few blocks northwest of the Palazzo Farnese.

Initially designed by Raphael for the Guild of Goldsmiths when they split off from the Guild of Ironworkers in 1509 and dedicated to their patron saint Eligius, it was completed by Baldassarre Peruzzi and Bastiano da Sangallo. Besides his work on St Peter's Basilica, this is the only church in Rome that, although partially, can definitely be attributed to Raphael. Its cupola is attributed to Baldassare Peruzzi and the interior is also by Raphael, in a Bramante-like style, though the present façade is early 17th century and by Flaminio Ponzio.

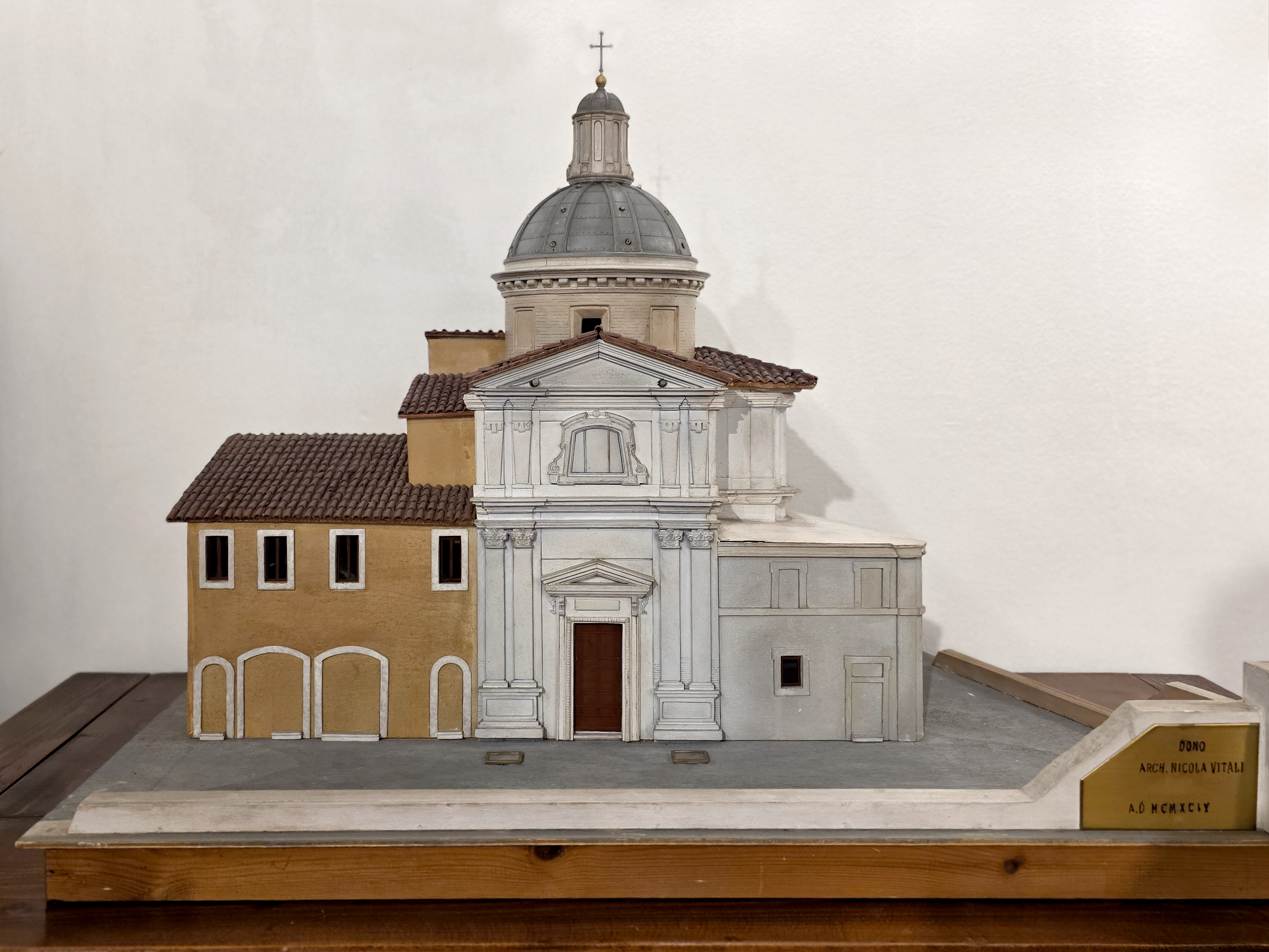
Model of Sant'Eligio degli Orefici

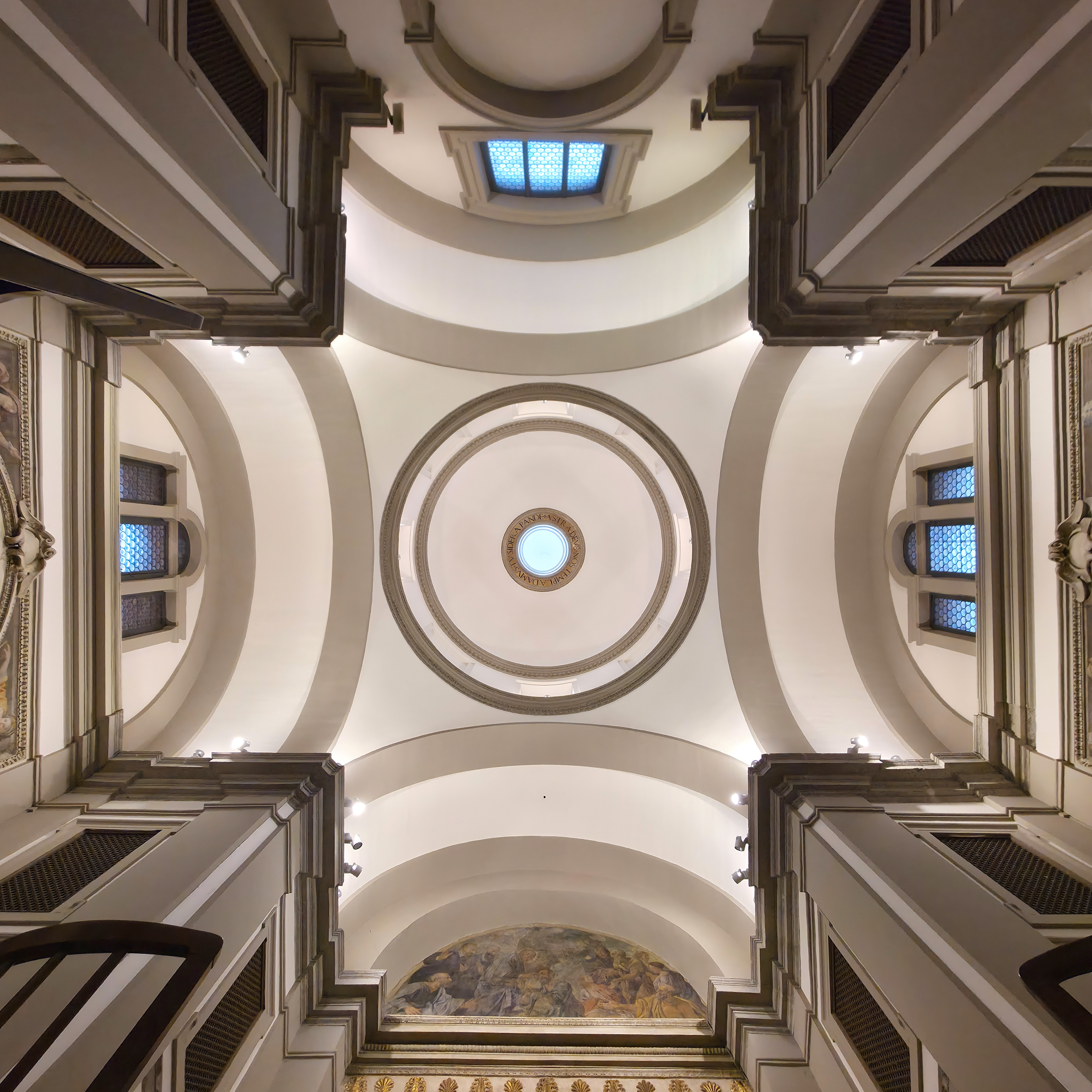
Dome and Greek Cross layout

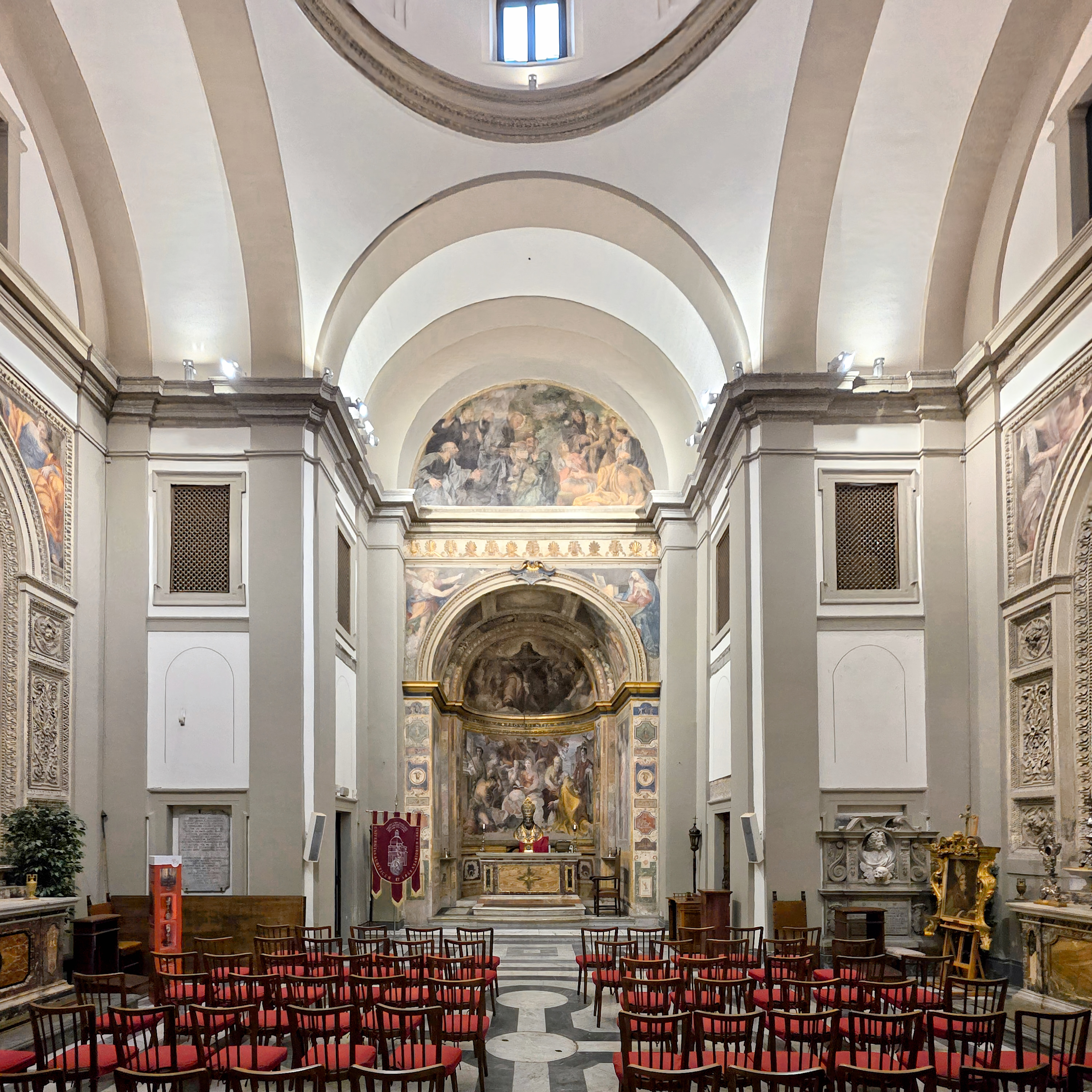
Church interior

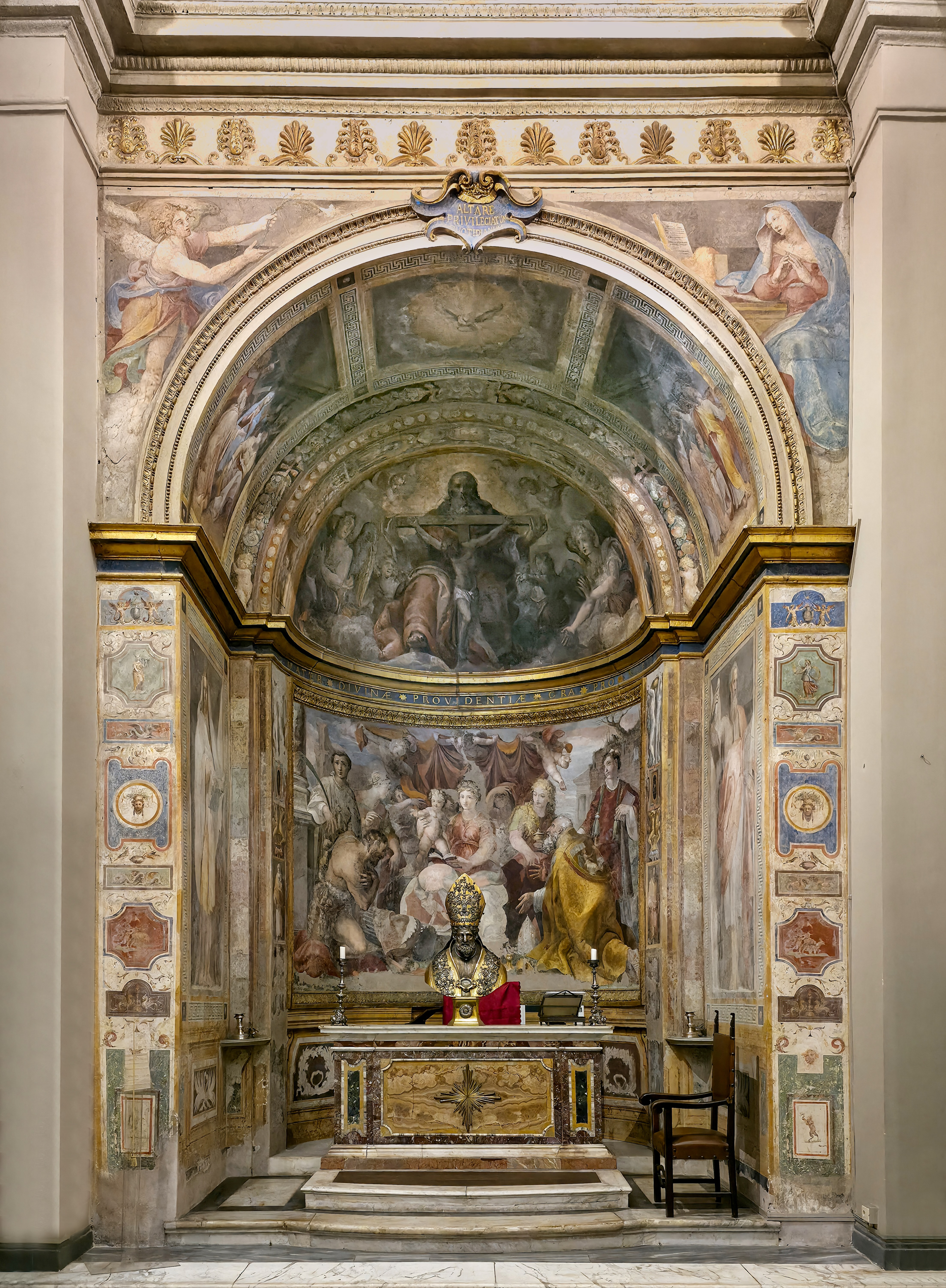
Apse paintings by Matteo da Lecce
