= Tomb of Pope Alexander VII =

Tomb monument by Gianlorenzo Bernini

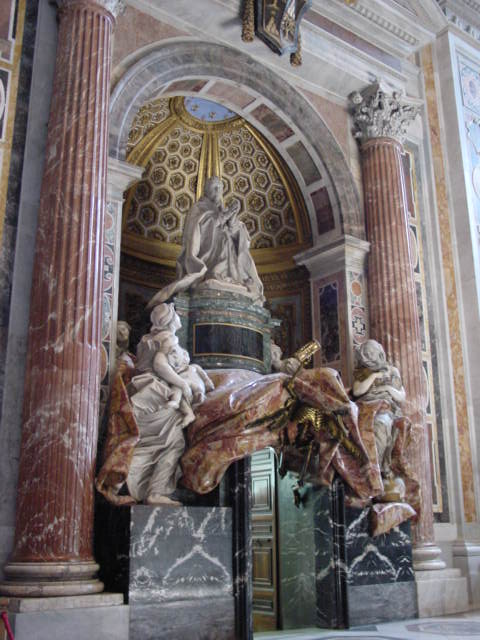
- Artist: Gian Lorenzo Bernini
- Year: 1671–1678
- Catalogue: 77
- Type: Sculpture
- Medium: Marble
- Subject: Pope Alexander VII
- Dimensions: Over life-size
- Location: St. Peter's Basilica; Vatican City; 41°54′8″N 12°27′12″E
- Preceded by: Blessed Ludovica Albertoni
- Followed by: Statue of Pope Clement X

The Tomb of Pope Alexander VII is a sculptural monument designed and partially executed by the Italian artist Gian Lorenzo Bernini. It is located in the south transept of St. Peter's Basilica in the Vatican City. The piece was commissioned by Pope Alexander VII himself. However, construction of the monument did not start until 1671 and was completed in 1678, eleven years after the Pope's death. At the age of 81, this would be Bernini's last major sculptural commission before his death in 1680.

== Figures ==
There are six significant figures in the monument. At the apex is Alexander kneeling in prayer. Below him are four female statues representing virtues practiced by the Pontiff. On the foreground is Charity with a child in her arms. To the right of that is Truth, whose foot rests on a globe. More precisely, Truth's foot is placed directly over England and is driving a thorn into it, where Pope Alexander had striven to subdue the growth of Anglicanism. On the second level are Prudence and Justice. These statues were carved in white marble. Most dramatically, below Alexander, the figure of Death is represented in gilded bronze, shrouded in a billowing drapery of Sicilian jasper. He raises an hourglass to symbolize that time has passed. The hourglass is also an artistic symbol of "memento mori" which translates from Latin to "remember you will die". The plinth is in black, as a sign of mourning for the Pope. The expansive billowing drapery of dark Sicilian jasper contrasts dramatically with the still white marble figures. In situations where Bernini needed a great mass of material, he could not depend just on marble recovered from ancient buildings and chose to work with a more modern marble. Thus he chose the Sicilian red jasper, the coloring rich in red tones with green streamed in. Even though the decision was based upon need, you can see Bernini's artistry throughout the tomb. The white marble contains a more pure feeling surrounding the figures of the Pope and the four virtues. This greatly contrasts to the dramatic drapery and the bronze figure of Death, both rich in color, adding emphasis to their meaning.

The monument was a collaboration between Bernini and his assistants, the latter doing most of the work under the close supervision of Bernini. These collaborators included G. Mazzuoli, L. Morelli, G. Cartari, M. Maglia, and L. Balestri. Bernini himself most likely worked on the statue of the Pope. Known for his portrait sculptures, he probably put the finishing touches to Alexander's face.

== Execution ==
Early in his pontificate, Alexander knew he would need a monumental tomb to immortalize him; like his predecessors he commissioned the celebrated artist Bernini. The papal diary first mentions the monument as early as August 9, 1656. After his death, the project was directed and paid for by Alexander's nephew, Cardinal Flavio Chigi. Under Pope Clement IX, the tomb was originally to be placed in the choir of Santa Maria Maggiore. After Clement's death, the idea was abandoned and the location changed to St. Peter's Basilica. The tomb was to be placed in a niche containing a door of the south transept. Bernini cleverly incorporated Death and the marble shroud hanging slightly over the door since it could not be moved.

Bernini began working on a design and model of the whole tomb and on October 7, 1672, and was paid one thousand scudi for the start of his work. There are many surviving early designs of the tomb that still exist today. An early design of the tomb that was made in Bernini's studio survives in the Royal Library at Windsor. Two small clay bozzetti have survived which include Charity, in the Istituto delle Belle Arti in Siena, and the kneeling pope of Alexander in the Victoria and Albert Museum in London. In December 1671, the actual construction of the tomb began with wooden and clay framework or the full-scale model of the tomb. The last payment to Bernini is recorded on April 9, 1672. After receiving his payment, Bernini had drawings sent out to the quarry specifying the size of the marble blocks on July 23 of that same year. The tomb was almost finished but there was another pope who had something to say about it. Pope Innocent XI, once the tomb was unveiled, had objected to not only the nudity of Truth but also the bare breasts of Charity. Thus Bernini was forced to dress the figures. The last commissioned piece of Gianlorenzo Bernini was finally finished and unveiled in 1678.

== See also ==
- List of works by Gian Lorenzo Bernini

== Gallery ==
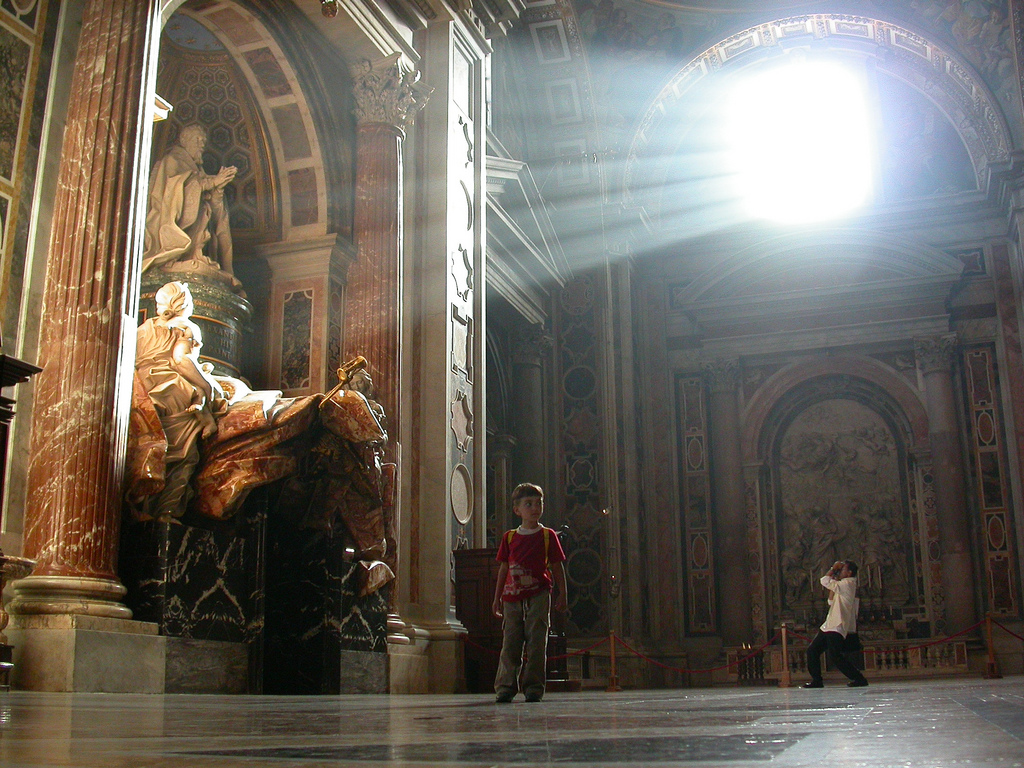
Side View of Tomb of Alexander VII

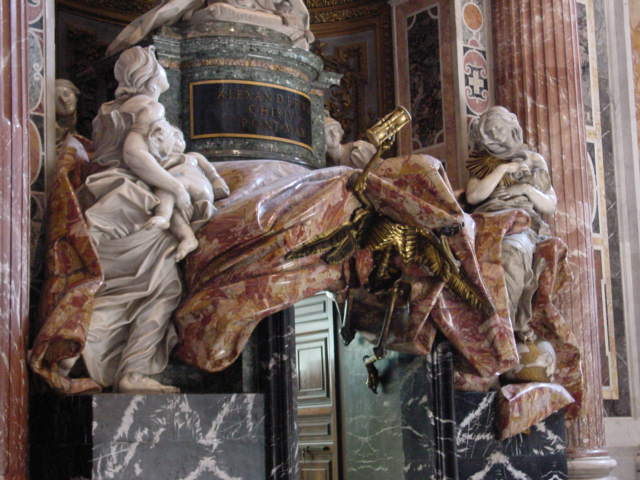
Detail of the Tomb of Alexander VII

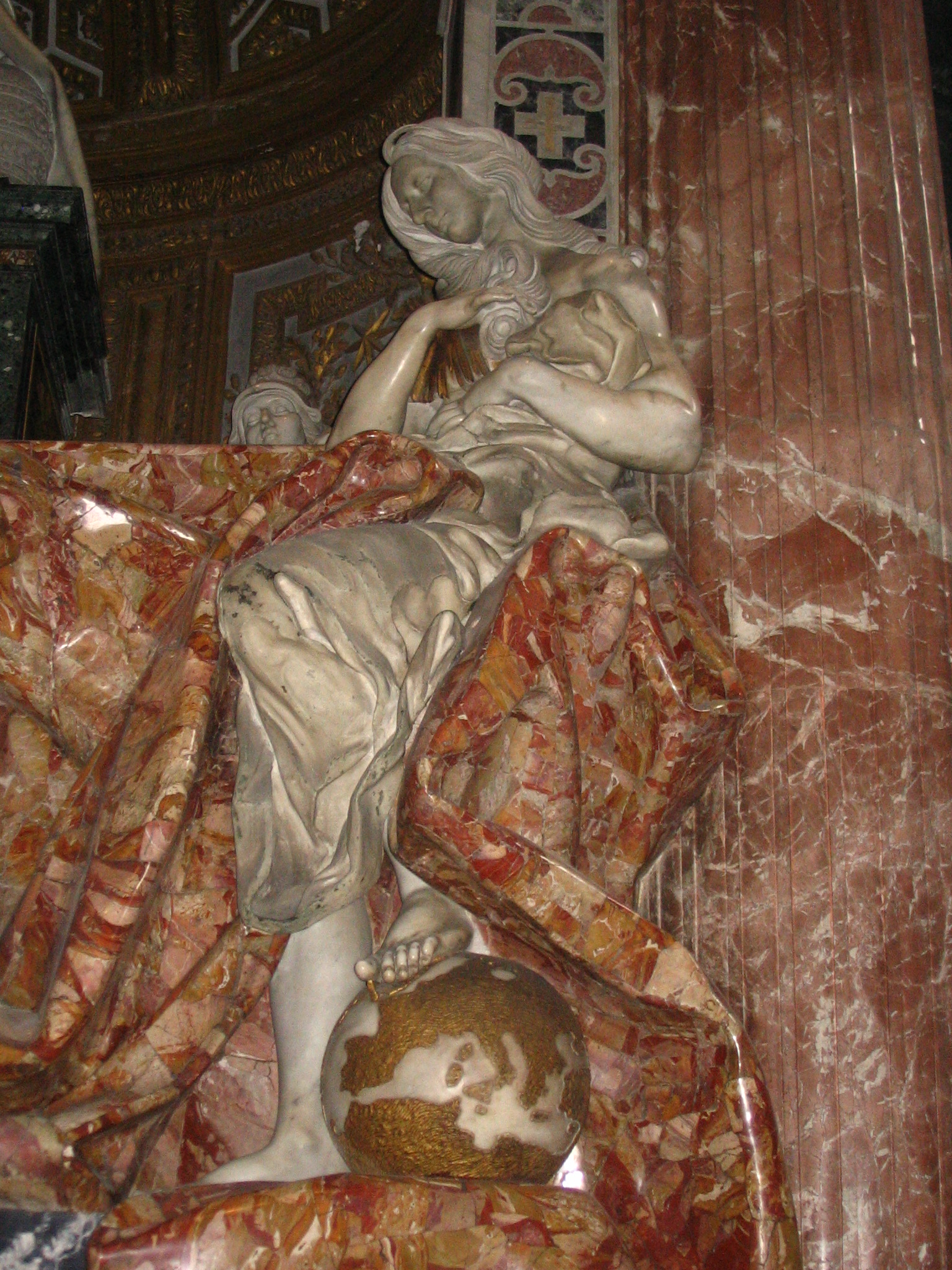
Figure of Truth, sculpted by Lazzaro Morelli and Giulio Catari
