= Bust of the Saviour =

Sculpture by Gianlorenzo Bernini

- Salvator Mundi
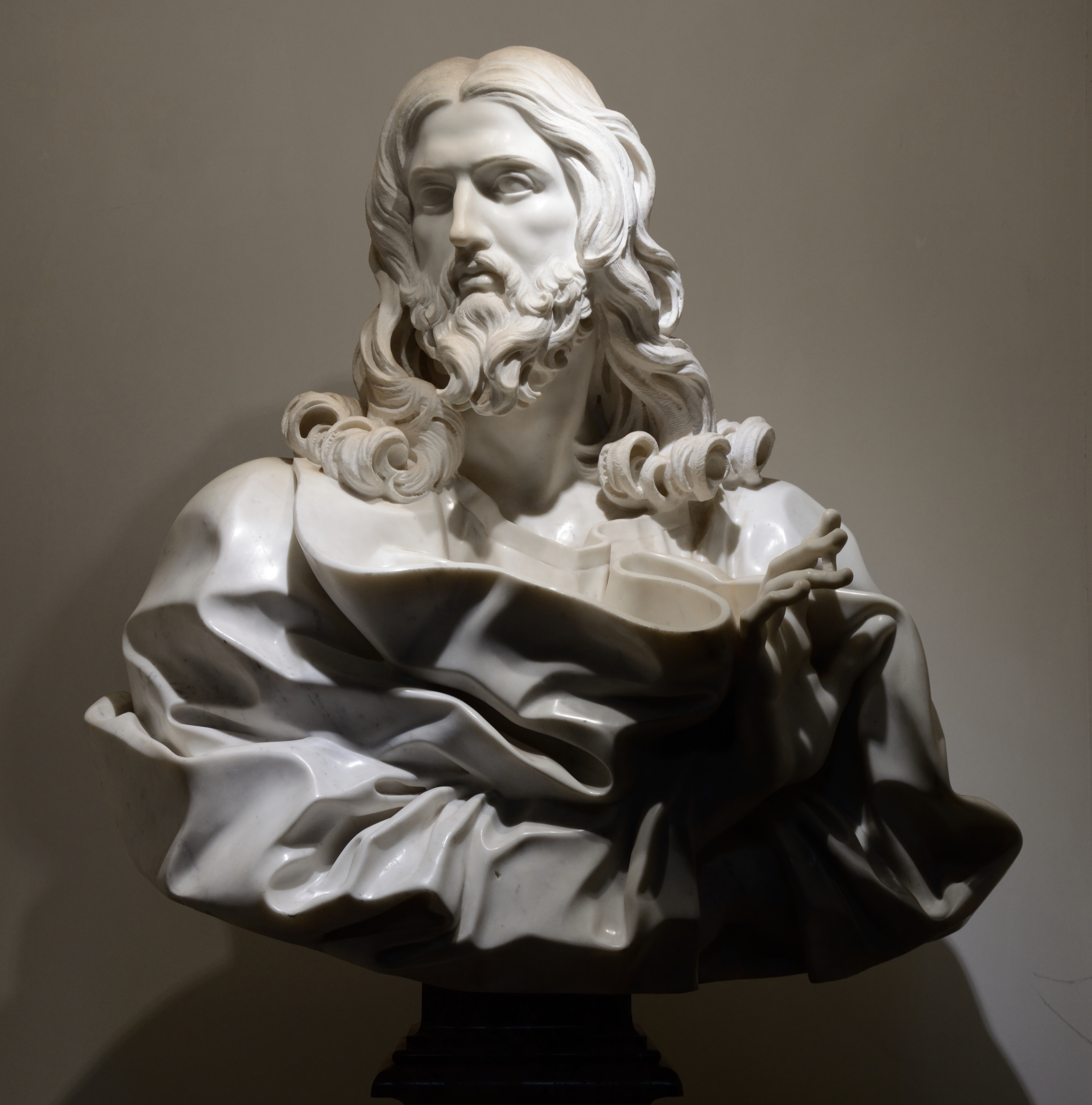
- Bust of Jesus Christ by Gianlorenzo Bernini
- Artist: Gian Lorenzo Bernini
- Year: 1679
- Location: San Sebastiano fuori le mura, Rome
- Preceded by: Statue of Pope Clement X

The Bust of the Saviour (Salvator Mundi) is the last sculpture created by baroque artist Gian Lorenzo Bernini, who died from the after-effects of a stroke, when the artist was 81 years old. He left the sculpture in his will to his friend and patron queen Christina of Sweden. Considered lost and "rediscovered" in 2001, by Francesco Petrucci, it is currently held in the basilica of San Sebastiano fuori le mura in Rome.

== Dispute ==
However, there is some dispute over the authorship of the bust. The art historian Tomaso Montanari believes this version is not by Bernini, pointing instead to the version in the Chrysler Museum in Norfolk, USA, which the museum also attributes to Bernini.

== See also ==
- List of works by Gian Lorenzo Bernini
