= Palazzo Borghese =

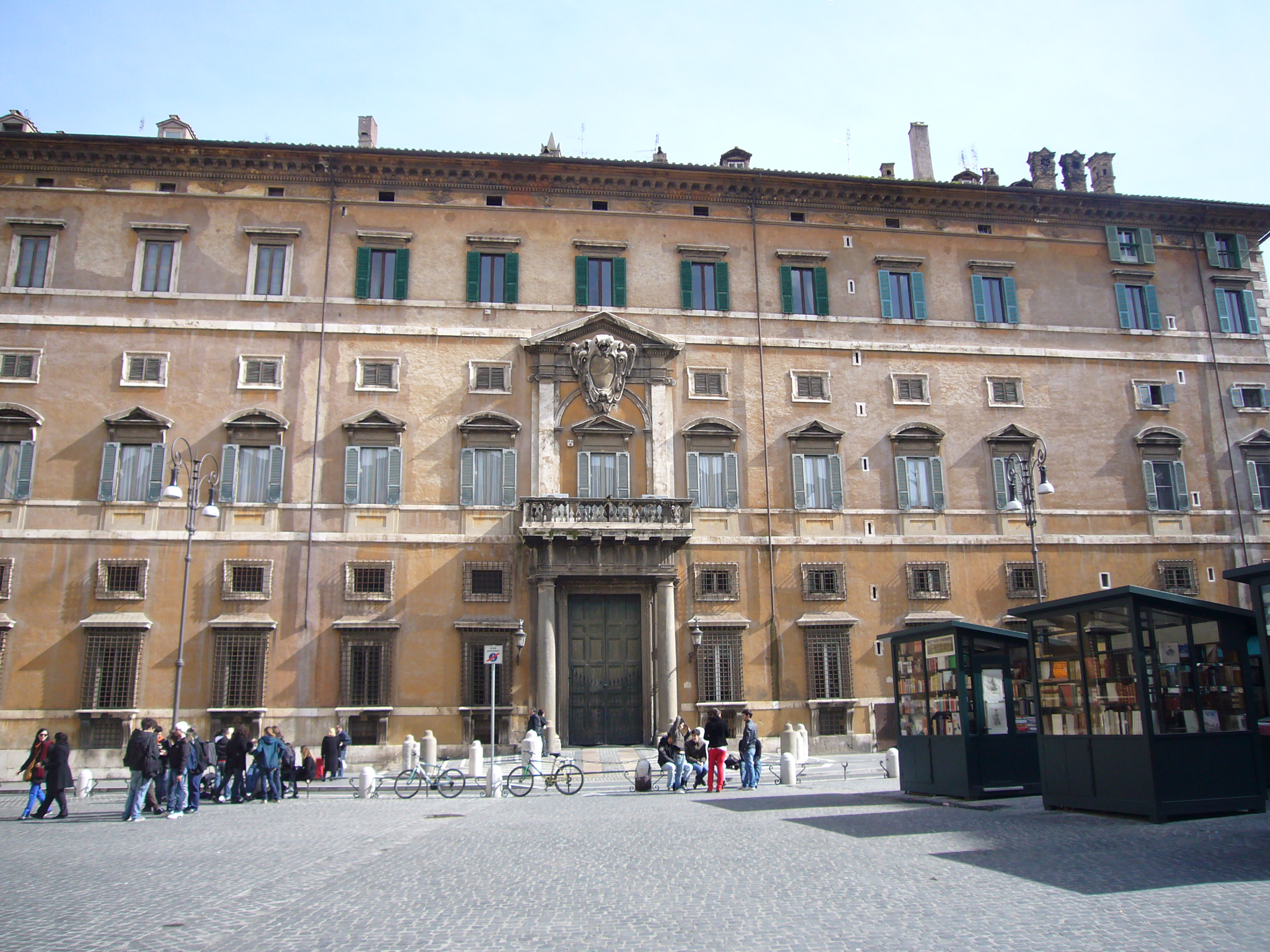
- The main façade
- Click on the map for a fullscreen view

General information
- Location: Rome, Italy
- Coordinates: 41°54′14″N 12°28′35″E

Palazzo Borghese is a palace in Rome, Italy, the main seat of the Borghese family. It was nicknamed il Cembalo ("the harpsichord") due to its unusual trapezoidal groundplan; its narrowest facade faces the River Tiber. The entrance at the opposite end of the building, the "keyboard" of the cembalo, faces onto the Fontanella di Borghese, with another in a great flanking facade to the Piazza Borghese that is extended by a slightly angled facade leading down Via Borghese towards the river. Both these entrances lead into a large courtyard on one side of which is a two level open arcade, with paired Doric and Ionic columns, that frames the garden beyond.

The first floor of the palace is the seat of the Embassy of Spain in Italy since 1947.

== History ==
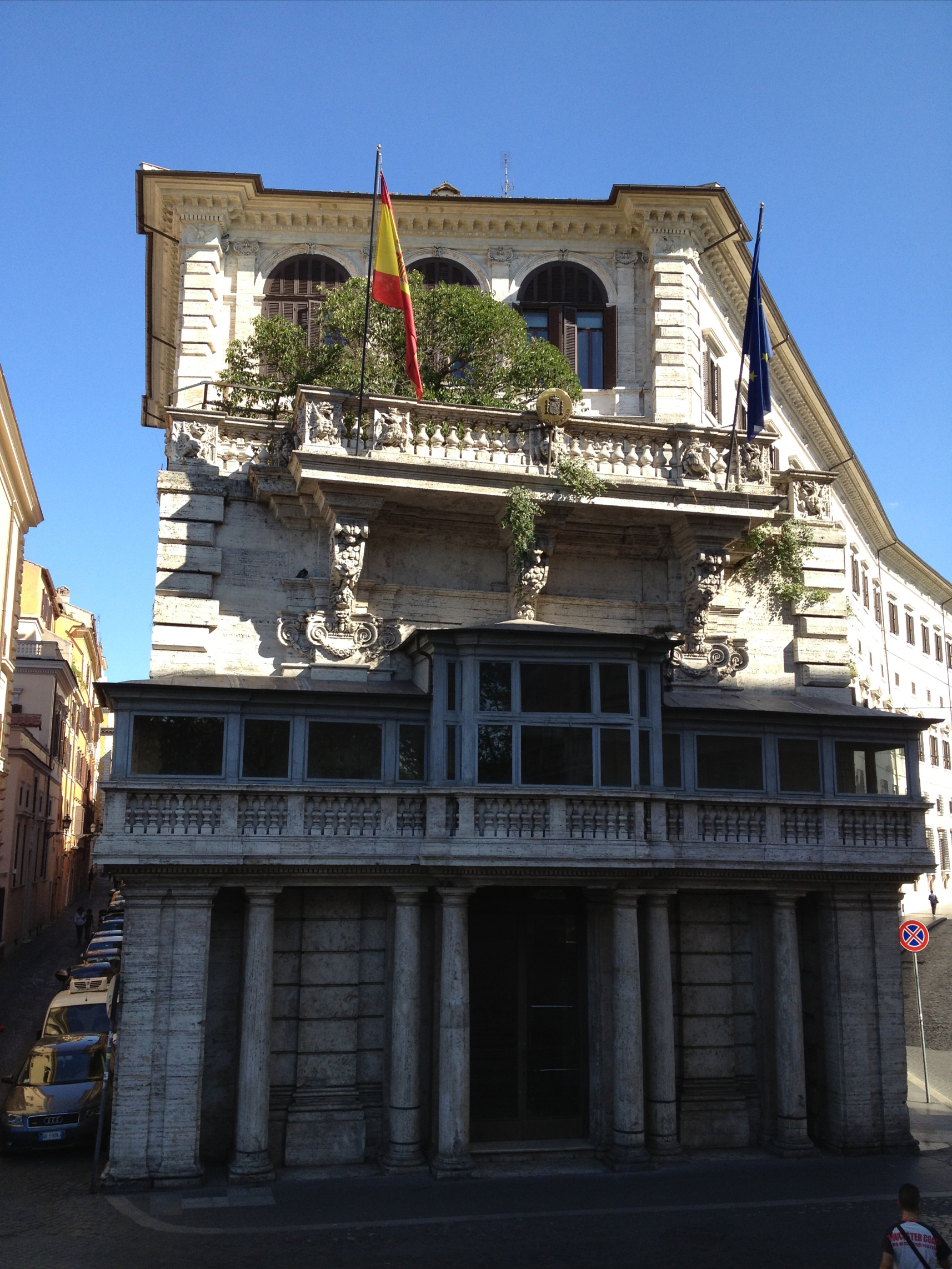
Flaminio Ponzio's rear façade of Palazzo Borghese on the Tiber River

The architectural historian Howard Hibbard has demonstrated that the nine-bay section of the palace on Piazza Fontanella Borghese was begun in 1560/61 for Monsignor Tommaso del Giglio, whose coat of arms or stemma remain over the door in Piazza Borghese, and he suggests that the architect was Vignola, an attribution accepted by Anthony Blunt, considered conclusive by James S. Ackerman and followed by other scholars since, with more or less reduced interventions by Longhi. Before Tomasso del Giglio died in 1578, the façade and the unique but undocumented double-columned two-storey arcade of the courtyard had been established, a conceptual scheme of Vignola's, Hibbard suggested, but which was carried out in 1575-78 by Martino Longhi the Elder. Longhi was retained by Pedro Cardinal Deza, who bought the property in 1587, but seems to have done little more than continue the great courtyard.

Cardinal Camillo Borghese purchased the structure in 1604 and acquired further adjacent properties towards the river. When the Cardinal became Pope Paul V in 1605, he gave the palace to his brothers but continued to commission the work, which was carried forward vigorously, at first by Flaminio Ponzio, and completed after Ponzio's death in 1613 by Carlo Maderno and Giovanni Vasanzio. Ponzio extended the square courtyard from five to seven bays, and the oval stair between the courtyard and a garden that stretched as far as the Ripetta. He also constructed the secondary facade onto the Piazza Borghese and down towards the Tiber, with balconies above the rusticated entrance on the Via di Ripetta.

On the death of his uncle, Cardinal Scipione Borghese took up residence and undertook changing the garden to a loggia and hanging garden.

In 1671-76 Carlo Rainaldi added new features for Prince Giovan Battista Borghese; the most extensive changes were made on the newly raised ground floor of the long wing extending towards the Tiber, ending with river views, which the Borghese found the most congenial dwelling spaces: Rainaldi added the columnar loggia to Ponzi's end facade (illustration, right), and on the interior a richly stuccoed oval chapel, and the narrow barrel-vaulted galleria, the highly charged Cortonesque decorative details of which were designed by Giovan Francesco Grimaldi (1606–1680).

The Porto di Ripetta, the port of Rome, was along the river bank of the Via di Ripetta. From 1707, the Tiber side of Palazzo Borghese would have overlooked the scenographic steps of the Porto di Ripetta designed by Alessandro Specchi. The port was destroyed in the 19th century with the development of Lungotevere.

== Overview ==
The main façades have three stories with two mezzanines inserted between them and the two majestic portals are flanked by columns and a balcony. Through the portal on the Piazza Fontanella Borghese, a view across the courtyard is centred on one of the wall fountains in the garden beyond.

The edifice has a magnificent inner courtyard, surrounded by ninety-six granite columns and decorated with statues, a nympheum, and other features, as well as an enclosed garden with three niche wall-fountains built to designs by Johann Paul Schor and finished by Rainaldi for Prince Giovan Battista Borghese in 1673. The court has been described as "one of the most spectacular existing, not only in Rome".

The façade towards the Piazza Fontanella Borghese faces another Borghese palace, rebuilt in the 16th century by Scipio Borghese to house the lesser members of the family, the stables and the servants.

Palazzo Borghese was the original seat of the family's art collection, with works by Raphael, Titian and many others, transferred in 1891 to the Galleria Borghese in Villa Borghese.

The balcony scene in the 1968 film Romeo and Juliet was filmed not at this Palazzo Borghese but at Palazzo Borghese in Artena outside Rome.

== Notes ==
Preceded by Palazzo Barberini	Landmarks of Rome; Palazzo Borghese	Succeeded by Palazzo della Cancelleria
