= Scipione Borghese =

Italian Cardinal, art collector and patron of the arts

His Eminence Scipione Caffarelli-Borghese
- Cardinal Bishop of Sabina
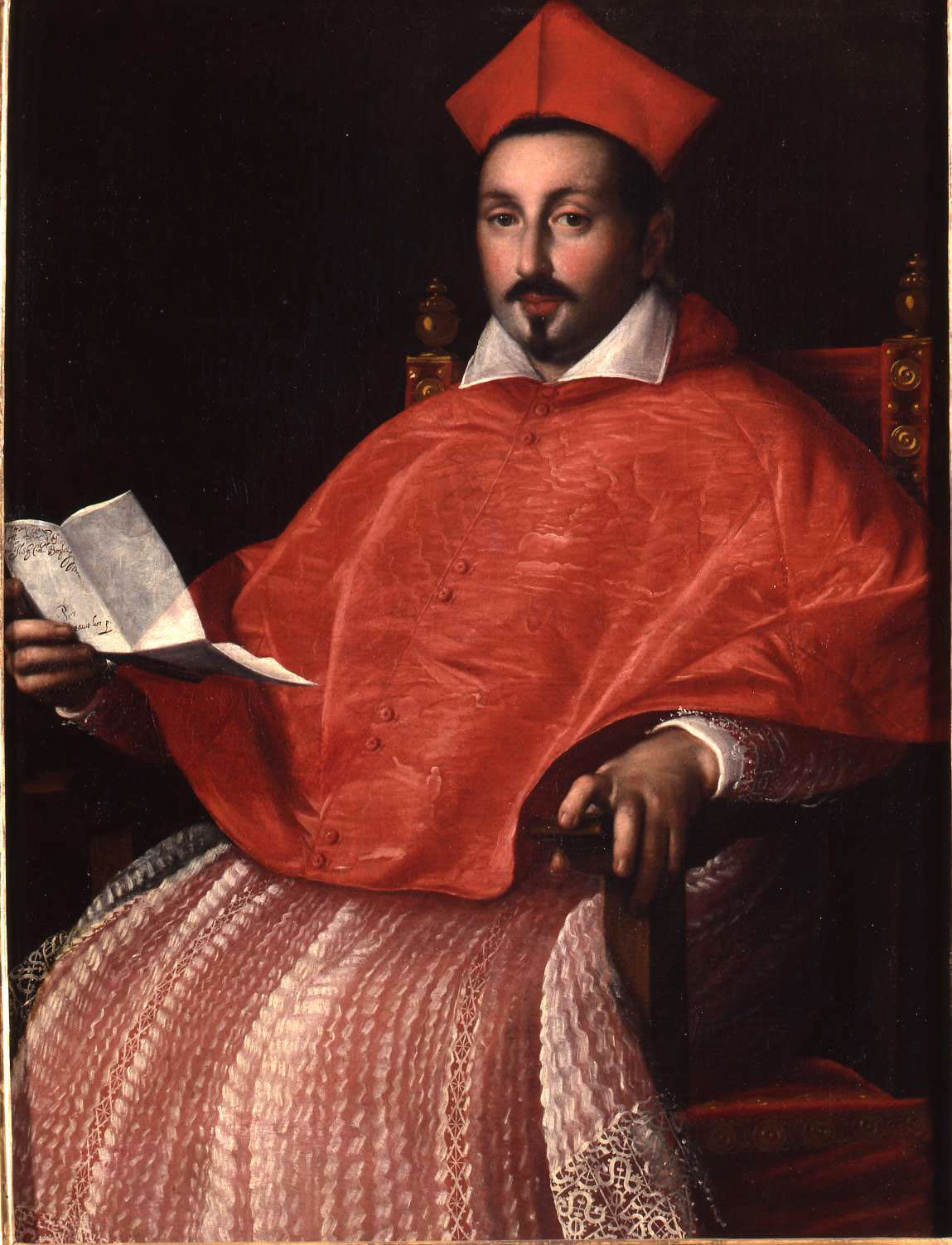
- Portrait by Ottavio Leoni
- Church: Catholic Church
- Archdiocese: Bologna
- Installed: 25 October 1610
- Term ended: 2 April 1612
- Predecessor: Alfonso Paleotti
- Successor: Alessandro Ludovisi
- Other post: Grand Penitentiary

Orders
- Ordination: 7 August 1605
- Consecration: 8 December 1610 by Paul V
- Created cardinal: 18 July 1605 by Paul V
- Rank: Cardinal Priest (1605-1629); Cardinal Bishop of Sabina (1629-1633)

Personal details
- Born: Scipione Caffarelli; 1 September 1577 Artena, Papal States
- Died: 2 October 1633 (aged 56) Rome, Papal States
- Buried: Basilica of St Mary the Major
- Denomination: Roman Catholicism
- Residence: Villa Borghese
- Parents: Francesco Caffarelli, Ortensia Borghese
- Coat of arms

Scipione Caffarelli-Borghese (Italian pronunciation: [ʃiˈpjoːne borˈɡeːze; -eːse]; 1 September 1577 – 2 October 1633) was an Italian cardinal, art collector and patron of the arts. A member of the Borghese family, he was the patron of the painter Caravaggio and the artist Bernini. His legacy is the establishment of the art collection at the Villa Borghese in Rome.

== Biography ==
=== Early life and cardinalship ===
He was born in Artena with name Scipione Caffarelli, the son of Francesco Caffarelli and Ortensia Borghese. Because his father ran into financial difficulties, Scipione's education was paid for by his maternal uncle Camillo Borghese. Upon Camillo's election to the papacy as Pope Paul V in 1605, he quickly conferred a cardinalship on Scipione and gave him the right to use the Borghese name and coat of arms.

In the classic pattern of papal nepotism, Cardinal Borghese wielded enormous power as the Pope's secretary and effective head of the Vatican government. On his own and the Pope's behalf, he used the family's fortune, amassed from their Sienese banking operations, to buy up abandoned properties in and around Rome, and, as Governor of the Papal States, he seized properties abandoned or forfeited for unpaid taxes and bought them for the family. In this way, perfectly legal and beneficial to civil administration, he redoubled the family's wealth and spent most of the gains on the city of Rome, restoring and endowing ancient churches, repairing roads and aqueducts, and improving security. He also guided careful excavation of ancient sites, recovered important ancient works of art, and identified and patronized young talents such as Gianlorenzo Bernini and Caravaggio.

=== Cardinal ===
Scipione received many honours from his uncle. He became superintendent general of the Papal States, legate in Avignon, archpriest of the Lateran and Vatican basilicas, prefect of the Signature of Grace, Abbot of Subiaco and San Gregorio da Sassola on the Coelian, and Librarian of the Holy Roman Church. He also assumed the offices of Grand Penitentiary, secretary of the Apostolic Briefs, Archbishop of Bologna, protector of Germany and the Habsburg Netherlands, of the Orders of Dominicans, Camaldolese and Olivetans, of the Shrine of Loreto and of the Swiss Guard, and numerous other ecclesiastical positions. In each of these offices the cardinal received stipends. His income in 1609 was about 90,000 scudi, and by 1612 it had reached 140,000 scudi. With his enormous wealth, he bought the villages of Montefortino and Olevano Romano from Pier Francesco Colonna, Duke of Zagarolo for 280,000 scudi.

As Cardinal Nephew (an official post until it was abolished in 1692), Borghese was placed in charge of both the internal and external political affairs of the Papal States. In addition, Paul V entrusted his nephew with the management of the finances of both the papacy and the Borghese family.

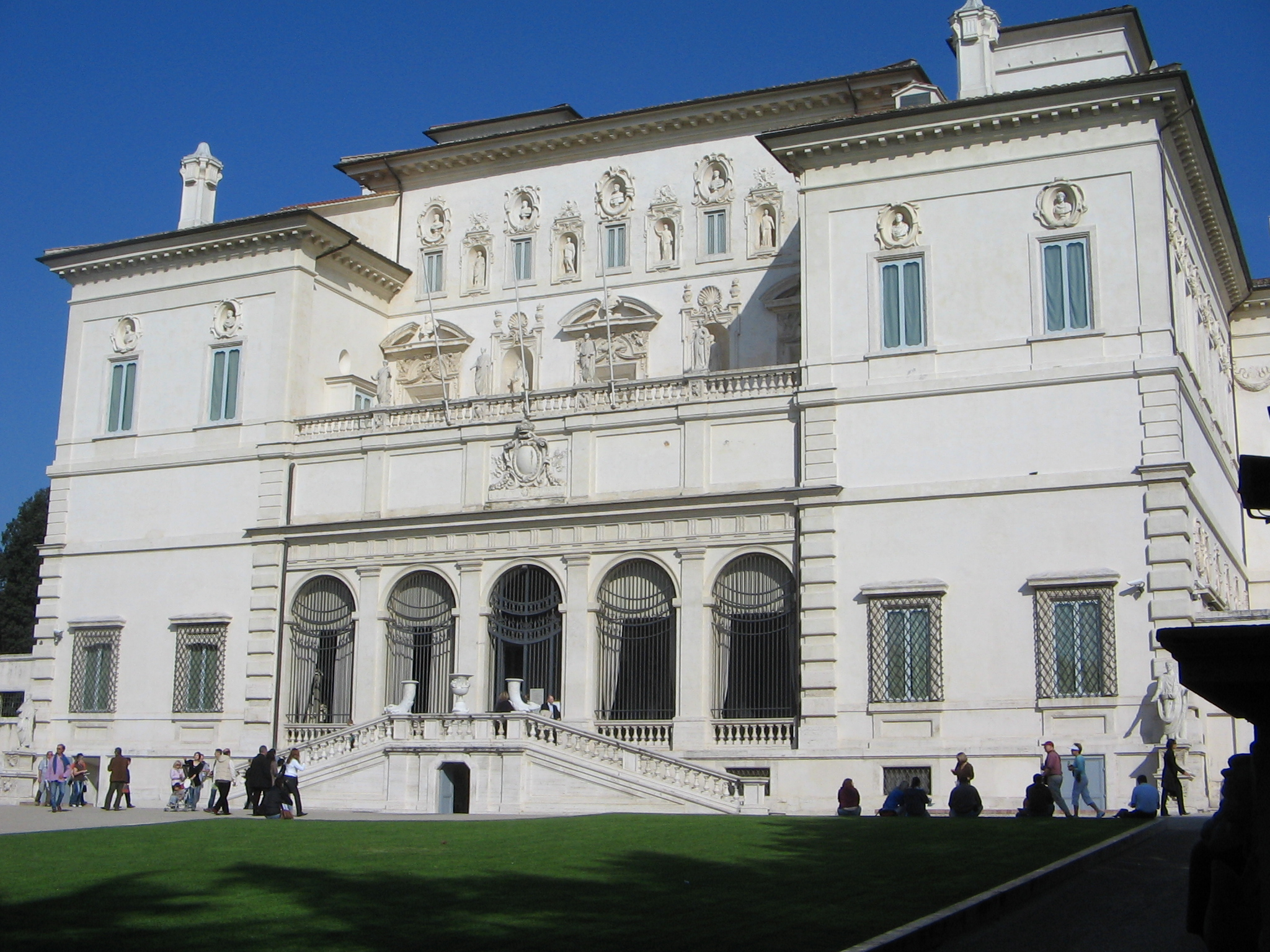
The Villa Borghese

Borghese aroused a great deal of controversy and resentment by utilizing numerous "gifts" from the papal government to fund Borghese family investments. Identifying rental properties as the most efficient means to ensure financial stability, he purchased entire towns and other extensive properties, including approximately one-third of the land south of Rome. Exploiting his authority as Cardinal Nephew, he often compelled owners to sell their holdings to him at substantial discounts. Borghese thus ensured that the fortunes of the family were not permanently dependent on ecclesiastical office.

Cardinal Scipione Borghese died in Rome in 1633 and is buried in the Borghese chapel in Santa Maria Maggiore.

=== Private life ===
Contemporaries commented on the near-public scandals that resulted on occasions from Scipione's possible homosexuality, reflected in his taste for collecting art with strong homoerotic overtones. In 1605, Scipione allegedly angered his uncle the pope by bringing Stefano Pignatelli, to whom Scipione was closely attached, to Rome.

According to the later writer Gaetano Moroni, Scipione:

...mindful for Stefano's affection, invited him to Rome and admitted him to his court, where Stefano acquired such an ascendancy over the cardinal that he did everything according to his advice. It was enough for envy and jealousy among courtiers to utter malicious and venomous calumnies against him, which prompted cardinals and ambassadors to report to the pope that Stefano was full of loathsome vices, and that for his nephew's honour, it was necessary to banish him entirely.

Scipione subsequently fell into a long and serious sickness, and only recovered when Pignatelli was allowed to come. The pope decided to keep a check on Pignatelli and had him ordained, the beginning of a career which led to him becoming a cardinal in 1621. Indeed, the Italian historian Lorenzo Cardella notes that Pignatelli was cleared twice by the Roman Inquisition of having "improper influence" on Cardinal Borghese.

However, more recently published espionage reports of Giovanni Antonio Marta speak against the results of such official investigation and substantially confirm the homosexual inclinations of Cardinal Scipione. They include a report of a nobleman whom Scipione was said to love "to the point of insanity", and for whom he was determined to secure a cardinal's hat; as well as a darker episode where a young man of eighteen was supposedly murdered in Scipione's ante-chamber by his servants after leaving the cardinal's bed.

== Building projects ==
=== Development of Gardens ===
Borghese took special interest in the development of the extensive gardens undertaken by various artists at his Roman residences, the Palazzo Borghese on the Quirinal (primarily 1610–16) and the Villa Borghese (initiated in 1613 and elaborated for the rest of the Cardinal's life). Both these influential gardens featured innovative elements such as waterfalls, and they incorporated dense groves of trees, which provided rural seclusion within the city.

=== Restoration of Churches ===
In the first half of his career, Scipione's church building was associated with his commendatrial or titular duties; in the latter half his public patronage was more wide-ranging, intervening at San Crisogono, Santa Maria sopra Minerva, Santa Maria della Vittoria, Santa Chiara a Casa Pia, San Gregorio Magno, as well as building new churches in the nearby towns of Montefortino and Monte Compatri. During the Ludovisi papacy the major focus of Borghese's ecclesiastical patronage was on commemorative projects. The first was the embellishment of the Caffarelli chapel in Santa Maria sopra Minerva (1620–23). The second was the massive timber catafalque decorated with life-size plaster figures designed by Gian Lorenzo Bernini, erected in Santa Maria Maggiore (1622).

Borghese's first work after entering the Sacred College where he studied was the building and decoration of the oratory chapels of St. Andrew and St. Sylvia beside San Gregorio Magno al Celio. For Borghese to complete such a project declared his devotion to the city's Christian heritage, while also marking a gesture of respect for the great Church reformer of the previous generation. The restoration of San Sebastiano fuori le mura (November 1607 – 1614), a church built under Constantine (c. 312) housing the greatest collection of relics known at the time. San Sebastiano was in addition one of the Seven Pilgrim Churches of Rome and its restoration was a key element in the pilgrimage-driven revival of the circuit. Borghese's restoration was in effect a complete modernization: rebuilding the main façade, adding a rear entrance, and thoroughly overhauling the interior in a modern decorative idiom.

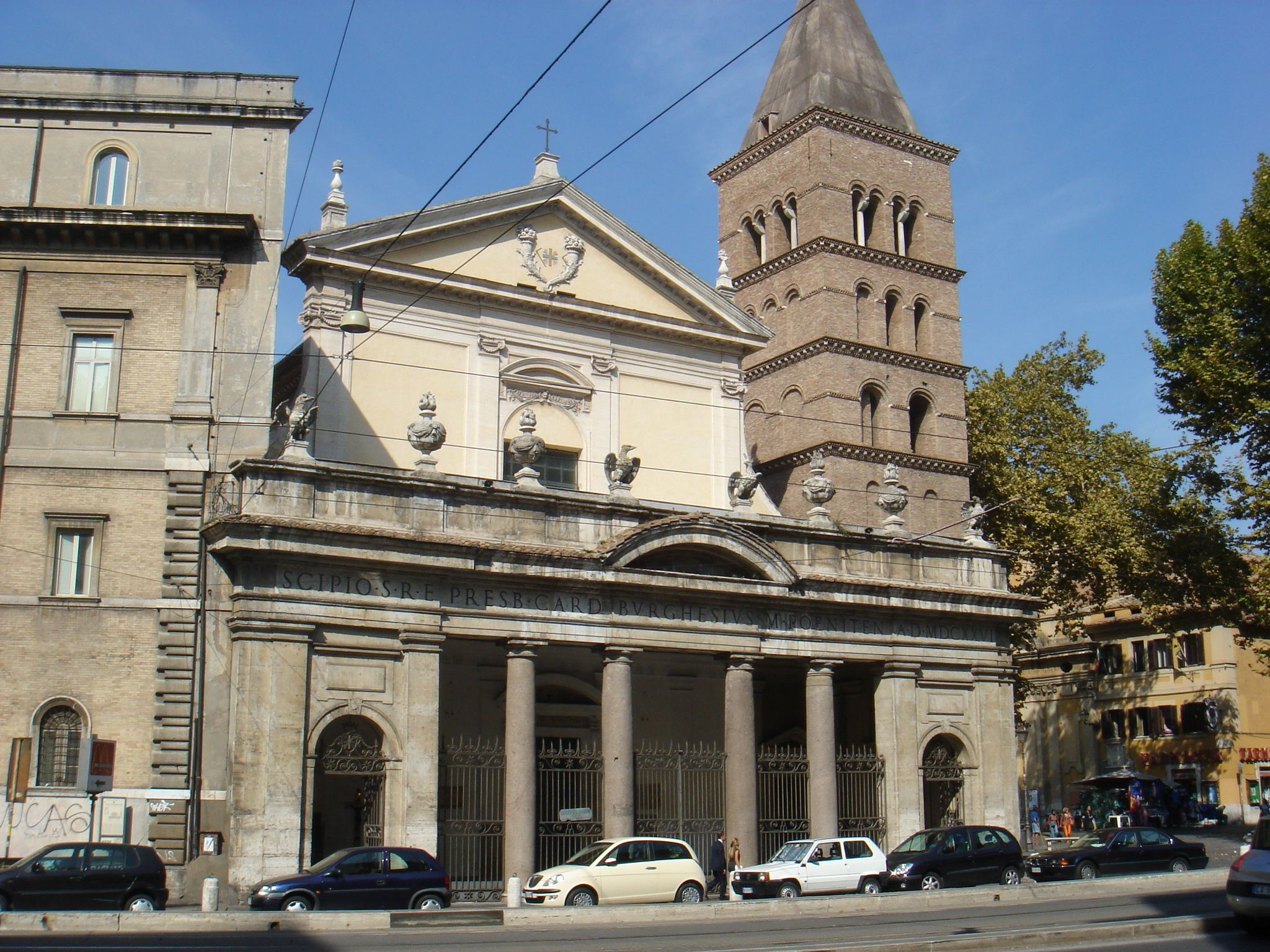
San Crisogono

The most striking feature of the restoration is the incidence of Borghese's name and symbols. Atop the portico's parapet stand eagle and dragon (the Borghese symbols) statuettes; underneath is the façade dedication: Scipione Borghese, Grand Penitentiary, Cardinal and Priest of the Holy Roman Church, 1626. His coat of arms in the major panels of the ceiling's long axis is mounted not as normal in excucheons, but directly in the frame, the keystone of the proscenium arch at the end of the nave; underneath an inscription at the base of the baldachin dome there is another inscription.

As Cardinal, Borghese took seriously his responsibility to contribute to the care and decoration of the churches under his supervision. Particularly after the death of his uncle, he seems to have utilized the embellishment of church buildings to demonstrate concern for the well-being of the faithful. The reconstruction of San Crisogono, Rome (1618–28) was probably the most costly project of redecoration undertaken in any church in the city during the early seventeenth century. Gold covers the ceiling and many other surfaces.

Such public undertakings helped Borghese rehabilitate his reputation, though he never regained his political influence.

== Art collector ==
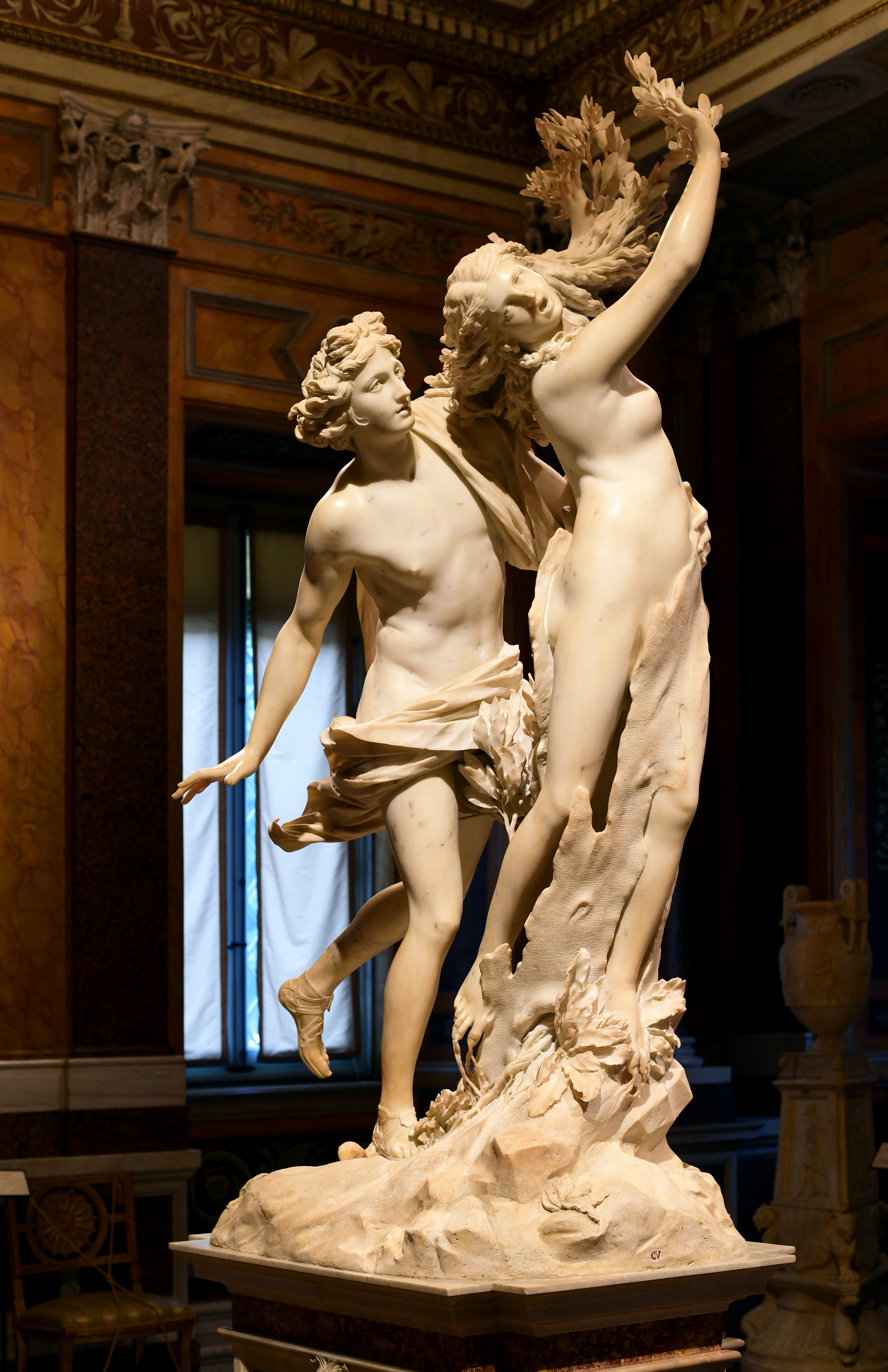
Apollo and Daphne, 1622–1625, Bernini commission (Galleria Borghese, Rome)

Borghese used the immense wealth that he acquired as Cardinal Nephew to assemble one of the largest and most impressive art collections in Europe. The Borghese Collection began around a collection of paintings by Caravaggio, Raphael, and Titian, and of ancient Roman art. Scipione also bought widely from leading painters and sculptors of his day. Even though later generations dispersed some of his acquisitions through sales and diplomatic gifts, the works that he assembled form the core of the holdings of the Galleria Borghese, a museum housed in the villa commissioned by Scipione (1613–15) from the architect Giovanni Vasanzio. Additional holdings were exhibited at the Villa Mondragone. His collection was poetically described as early as 1613 by Scipione Francucci.

The Satyr and Dolphin (Roman marble copy of lost Greek bronze, 4th century BCE) typifies the elegant and sensual depictions of young male figures that were prominently featured in Borghese's collection. One of his most prized works was the Hermaphrodite (Roman copy after Greek original of 2nd century BCE). From the young sculptor Gian Lorenzo Bernini, Scipione commissioned in 1620 a realistically rendered mattress on which to lay this sensuous nude figure. Borghese is reported to have kept this statue in a specially made wooden cupboard, which he would open with a theatrical flourish to the amusement of his close friends. However, this sculpture was given in the early 19th century to Napoleon upon Camillo Borghese's marriage to Pauline Bonaparte, sister of Napoleon, and is now in the Louvre. The Borghese collection today contains another 2nd-century copy that was found.

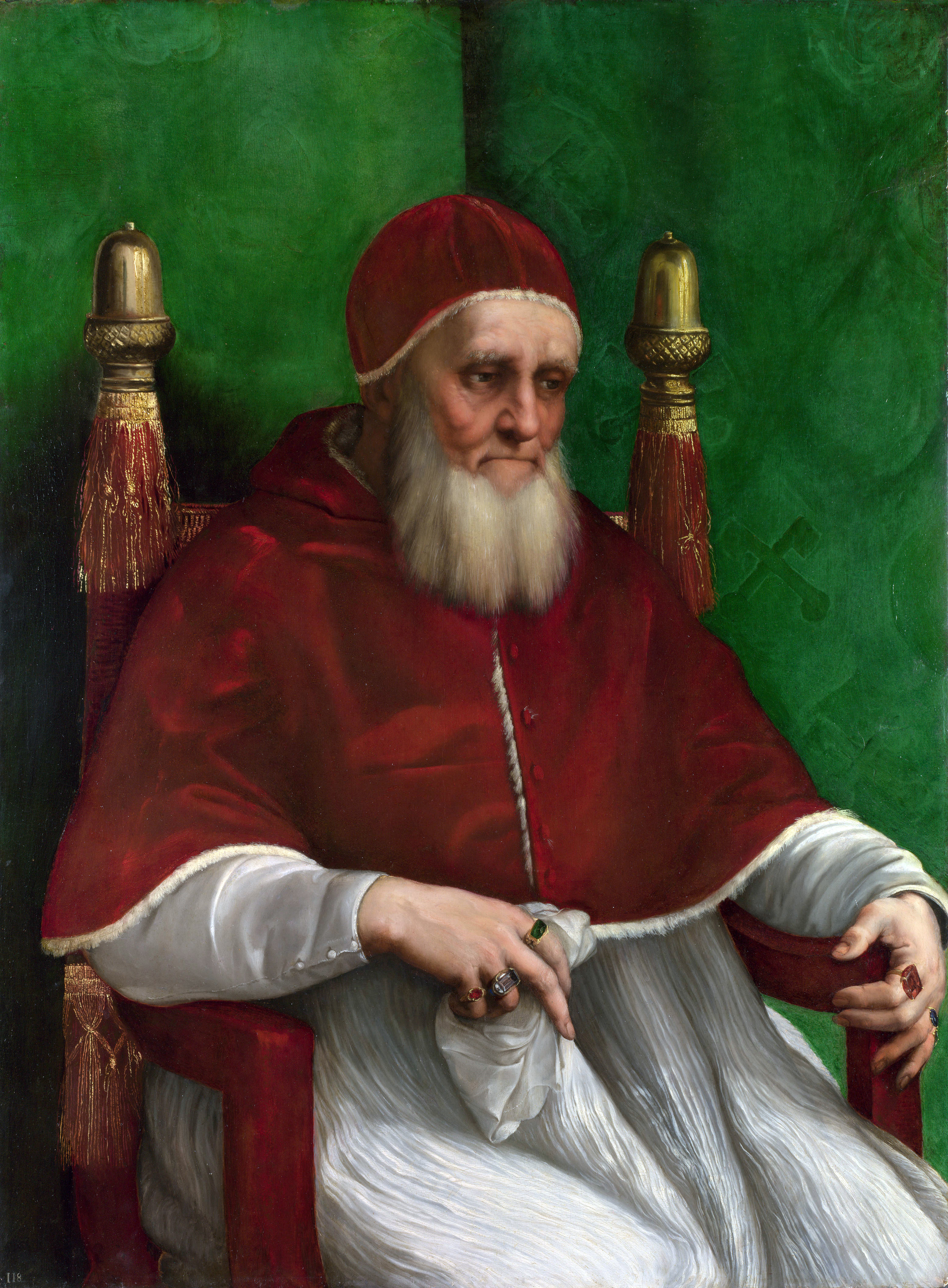
Raphael's Portrait of Julius II, purchased in 1608 by Scipione from Cardinal Sfondrati (National Gallery, London)

Pope Paul V willingly assisted his nephew's efforts to obtain the art works that aroused his interest. In 1607, the Pope gave the Cardinal a collection of 107 paintings which had been confiscated from the painter Cavalier D'Arpino after the artist did not pay a tax bill. In the following year, Raphael's Deposition was secretly removed from the Baglioni Chapel in the church of San Francesco in Perugia and transported to Rome to be given to Scipione through a papal motu proprio. The Borgheses were forced to provide Perugia with two excellent copies of the painting to avoid conflict with the angered city becoming violent, but the original remains in the Borghese collection.

=== Caravaggio ===
Among the pictures that Borghese acquired through the 1607 seizure from Cavaliere d'Arpino were two important early works by Caravaggio (both 1593, still in Galleria Borghese): a probable self-portrait, usually called Sick Bacchus, and Boy with a Basket of Fruit, an overtly homoerotic image of a youth extending a large basket of fruit seductively toward the viewer.

Borghese also greatly admired Caravaggio's naturalistic and psychologically complex later religious paintings, such as the brooding Saint John the Baptist (1605/6), which the collector acquired from the artist's estate shortly after his death, and the intense David with the Head of Goliath (1609/10), which represents the Biblical hero extending outwards a severed head with the features of the artist

Borghese appropriated Caravaggio's Madonna and Child with St. Anne, a large altarpiece commissioned in 1605 for a chapel in the Basilica of Saint Peter's, but rejected by the College of Cardinals because of its earthly realism and unconventional iconography. Recent archival research has established that Borghese intended from the early stages of the commission that the altarpiece would end up in his own collection.

=== Patronage of Bernini ===
Borghese's early patronage of artist Gian Lorenzo Bernini assisted to establish him as the leading Italian sculptor and architect of the seventeenth century. Between 1618 and 1623, Bernini worked primarily for the Cardinal, creating innovative pieces that would become early touchstones of the Baroque style. For the decoration of the Villa Borghese, Bernini produced a life-sized figure of David (1623) and three sculptural groups with mythological themes.

The culminating work in this series that Bernini created for Borghese, Apollo and Daphne (1623–1625), represents an incident popular in Italian poetry of the early seventeenth century, and ultimately derived from the Metamorphoses by the ancient Roman poet Ovid. Bernini depicts Apollo reaching out toward the river nymph Daphne just as she is transformed into a laurel tree by her father in order to prevent her from being burned by the touch of the god of the sun. Understood within its original intellectual context, this group represents frustrated desire and enduring despair and pain, provoked by love.

These meanings may have had special resonance for Borghese, who, at the time, was widely ridiculed for his attraction to other men. The specific moment depicted by Bernini also was thought in the early seventeenth century to signify the fusion of genders, more explicitly depicted in the Hermaphrodite also in the Cardinal's collection.

In 1632 Bernini executed two marble portrait busts of Borghese (both in Rome's Galleria Borghese). These works capture the exuberance that the Cardinal's friends admired and which his critics decried as frivolity inappropriate to his office.

=== Collection ===
Although he is most associated with the development of the Baroque, he also eagerly collected works of many artists of quite different styles.

Borghese's collection includes works as diverse as Early Renaissance altarpieces such as Fra Angelico's Last Judgment (ca 1450); examples of northern art such as two paintings of Venus (early 16th century) by Lucas Cranach; sixteenth-century Venetian paintings such as Titian's Sacred and Profane Love (1514); and classicizing pictures such as Domenichino's Diana (1616/7). The Cardinal even owned a very uncharacteristic work by Michelangelo, a depiction of Cupid now called "The Manhattan Marble".

Catholic Church titles
Preceded by Alfonso Paleotti	Archbishop of Bologna; 25 October 1610 – 2 April 1612	Succeeded by Alessandro Ludovisi
Preceded by Cinzio Passeri Aldobrandini	Grand penitentiary 5 January 1610 – 2 October 1633	Succeeded by Antonio Marcello Barberini
Preceded by Giacomo Sannesio	Chamberlain of Sacred College of Cardinals; 11 January 1621 – 9 January 1623	Succeeded by Maffeo Barberini
