= Giovanni Vasanzio =

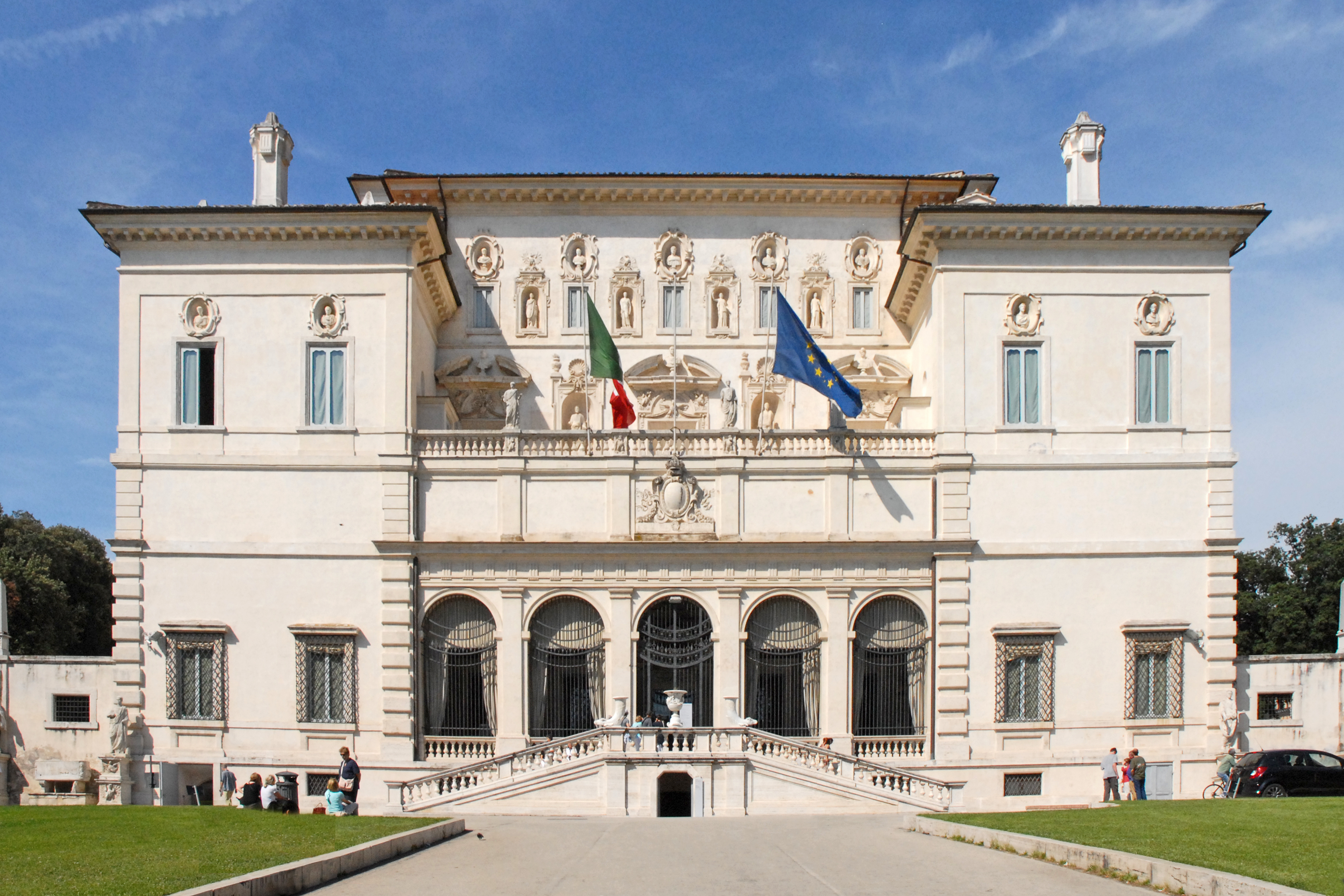
erected in 1613, the villa Pinciana (now the Villa Borghese) built by the architect Flaminio Ponzio, and after his death finished by his assistant Giovanni Vasanzio

Giovanni Vasanzio or Jan van Santen (1550 – 21 August 1621) was a Dutch-born architect, garden designer and engraver who spent his mature career in Rome, where he arrived in the 1580s.

Vasanzio was born in Utrecht. He worked as assistant to Flaminio Ponzio and completed works in progress at Ponzio's death (1613); he became in some sense the "house architect' for the Borghese, responsible for ephemeral decorations to provide settings for dynastic events both gay and grave. Vasanzio died in Rome. After his death, Giovanni Battista Soria assumed his role with the Borghese.

== Main commissions ==
- Palazzo Borghese, where he worked with Carlo Maderno after the death of Flaminio Ponzio.
- Built Ponzio's façade of San Sebastiano fuori le Mura (1612)
- Villa Borghese on the Pincio; Vasanzio designed the façade (1613–15); decoration continued 1618-19.
- Additions to Martino Longhi the Younger's Villa Mondragone, Frascati (1615)
- Fountain of the Acqua Paola, to Ponzio's design (1613)
- Fountain "della Galera", in the gardens of the Vatican Palace (1620).
- Ceiling of San Sebastiano fuori le mura.
