= Paolo Borghese =

Paolo Borghese may refer to:

- Paolo Borghese (1622–1646), Italian nobleman, first husband of Olimpia Aldobrandini
- Prince Paolo Borghese (1904–1985), Italian nobleman
