= Marcantonio III =

Marcantonio III may refer to:

- Marcantonio III Colonna (1585–1595) - grandson of Marcantonio II
- Marcantonio III Borghese, 5th Prince of Sulmona (1730–1800)
