= Borghese (skincare company) =

Italian skincare company

- Type: Privately held company
- Industry: Luxury skincare
- Founded: 1957; 69 years ago in Rome, Italy
- Founder: Princess Marcella Borghese
- Headquarters: New York City, New York, U.S.
- Products: Advanced Fango Active Mud for Face and Body (1985–present)
- Website: borghese.com

Borghese (also known as Borghese Roma) is an Italian luxury skincare company founded in Rome in 1957 by Princess Marcella Borghese, a member of the historic Borghese noble family. Based on Italian spa traditions and the thermal muds and mineral waters associated with Tuscan spa culture, the brand developed skincare products drawing on botanical ingredients.

Borghese became known for pioneering the 'at-home spa' experience through treatments intended to replicate professional spa therapies. The company is headquartered in New York City and is best known for its hero product, the Advanced Fango Active Mud for Face and Body. Its product lines incorporate botanically derived ingredients alongside contemporary skincare formulations and technology. As of 2024, Borghese is privately held and led by Chief Operating Officer Dawn Hilarczyk.

== History ==
=== Origins and founding ===
The Borghese family is one of the oldest and most prominent noble families in Italian history, with documented prominence dating to at least the 13th century. The family's best-known landmark, the Villa Borghese in Rome, was constructed in the 17th century as a family residence and repository for one of Italy's most significant private art collections. The Borghese eagle, originally conferred as a heraldic honor, remains a central element of the brand's logo to this day.

=== Founder ===
Princess Marcella Borghese (15 February 1911 - 19 January 2002) was an Italian socialite and businesswoman who founded the Borghese cosmetics line. Born Marcella Fazi in Umbria, in 1937 she became the second wife of the widowed nobleman Paolo Borghese, Duke of Bomarzo and Prince of Sant'Angelo e San Polo, acquiring the title of Princess. She had her personal toiletries formulated using botanical ingredients sourced from the gardens of the Villa Borghese, and became an early advocate for what would later be known as the at-home spa philosophy, drawing inspiration from the thermal spa retreats she frequented in Tuscany, particularly the mineral-rich baths and healing muds of the Terme di Montecatini. She was among the first figures in the beauty industry to create a skincare line based on the natural therapies of a spa. In the early 1950s, Princess Marcella resolved to translate her personal skincare rituals into a commercial product line, having previously had lipsticks made for herself color-coordinated to her wardrobe. According to the company, she sought and received a blessing from Pope Pius XII before proceeding with the venture. She commissioned her personal chemist to create eight lipstick shades and invited eight Italian fashion designers to create ensembles to coordinate with each color. Among her earliest and most enduring collaborators was fashion designer Emilio Pucci, whose brightly colored knitwear patterns inspired one of the Princess's first cosmetics collections. She remained involved with the brand bearing her name until her death at age 90 in Montreux, Switzerland. She was buried in the family crypt at the Basilica of Santa Maria Maggiore in Rome.

=== Partnership with Revlon and commercial launch (1956–1992) ===
In 1956, Princess Marcella met Charles Revson, the founder of Revlon, and the two formed a lifelong friendship and business partnership. The brand officially launched in October 1957, with Princess Marcella among the first beauty entrepreneurs to build a skincare line explicitly rooted in the natural therapies of European spa culture, specifically the healing muds and mineral waters of Tuscany. In 1976, Revlon purchased the Borghese cosmetics brand. Through the late 1970s and 1980s, the brand was positioned as Revlon's upscale prestige line, sold through luxury department stores. In 1985, Borghese introduced its most enduring product, the Fango Active Mud for Face and Body, a mineral treatment mask drawing on the volcanic and thermal mud traditions of Tuscany. D Magazine described the product as a 'spa-in-a-jar pioneer in the 1980s.'

=== Acquisition and restructuring (1992–2015) ===
In 1992, Revlon sold both its Borghese and Halston divisions to Halston Borghese International Limited. The sale marked the end of the brand's association with Revlon after more than three decades. Following the later breakup of Halston Borghese, the brand name was shortened to Borghese in 1997.

Between 2010 and 2013, the company was involved in trademark litigation with members of the Borghese family concerning use of the Borghese name in cosmetics. The matter was settled in September 2013.

=== Relaunch and modernization (2015–2023) ===
Following a period of reduced activity in the mid-2010s, the brand undertook a modernization effort beginning in 2018 that included updated packaging, an expanded retail presence at Lord & Taylor, Neiman Marcus, and Saks Fifth Avenue, and a reformulation of the Fango Active Mud.

In 2018, Borghese also announced Dr. Grace Ayensu-Danquah, a Fellow of the American College of Surgeons and Skin Reconstructive Surgeon, as Global Skin Expert, as the brand emphasized clinically tested formulations.

=== Recent developments (2024–present) ===
In March 2024, Borghese appointed Dawn Hilarczyk, formerly of Noble Panacea, as chief operating officer. Writing in WWD, Hilarczyk described the company's strategy as a 'renaissance,' focused on re-establishing the brand's Italian heritage, its 'at-home spa' positioning, and an omnichannel retail expansion. The brand discontinued its color cosmetics line to focus exclusively on skincare. Industry sources reported that the brand, previously estimated at $100 million in annual revenue, had contracted to approximately $50 million by 2024.

In 2024 and 2025, the brand expanded its retail presence, launching at Neiman Marcus, Ulta Beauty, Bloomingdale's, HSN, QVC and Nordstrom building on its existing presence at Dillard's, Macy's, and Amazon alongside direct-to-consumer sales through Borghese.com. In August 2025, Borghese opened a spa residency at Printemps New York City, coinciding with celebrations of the 40th anniversary of the Advanced Fango Active Mud Mask. The brand also has a retail presence in Asia, and South Africa markets. Fango sales were reported to be up 60 percent year-over-year in 2025, with the brand's direct-to-consumer business growing 21 percent and its Amazon business growing 61 percent.

== Products ==
Borghese offers a range of skincare and body care products, with a stated philosophy of combining botanical ingredients with modern science to replicate professional spa treatments at home. As of 2024, the brand's lineup consists of 27 core SKUs spanning face masks, cleansers, serums, moisturizers, and body care. The company states that its products are formulated without parabens, talc, sodium lauryl sulfate, phthalates, formaldehyde, petrolatum, mineral oil, and related compounds. Packaging for the Fango Mud mask has been produced in glass jars for approximately 40 years.

=== Advanced Fango Active Mud Mask ===
The Advanced Fango Active Mud Mask for Face and Body, commonly referred to simply as Fango, the Italian word for mud, is the brand's hero product and its best-known product globally. Launched in 1985, it is among the earliest prestige mud masks sold for at-home use, drawing on the tradition of mineral mud treatments historically practiced at Italian thermal spas. D Magazine described the product as 'a spa-in-a-jar pioneer in the 1980s.' As of 2025, more than 20 million jars have been sold, and WWD reported that the product sells at a rate of approximately one unit per minute. It was named winner of the Harper's Bazaar Beauty Icon Award in 2025.

The current formulation centers on mineral-rich bentonite clay, botanical oils, and bio-ferments. Key ingredients include bentonite clay, which draws oil and impurities from pores; avocado oil and vitamins A, C, D and E for nourishment and hydration; a Skin Vitality Booster and radish root ferment to support the skin's microbiome; and an anti-stress complex of chaga mushroom with a botanical adaptogen blend of rhodiola rosea, Siberian ginseng and maral root. The product is designed for a five-minute application and is positioned for combination, normal and oily skin. In 2010, the brand marked the 25th anniversary of Fango with a national 'Do You Fango?' advertising campaign, which ran in print, on taxi tops and buses, and on electronic signs in Times Square. In 2025 Borghese celebrated its 40th anniversary with a nostalgic '1985 is Calling' campaign paying homage to the brand's 1980s heritage.

The Fango line has expanded over the years to include variant formulas including the Advanced Fango Delicato Mud (formulated for delicate, dry skin) and Fango Purificante Purifying Mud (targeting blemish-prone skin, launched April 2026). COO Dawn Hilarczyk told WWD the product was inspired by social listening on Reddit around acne and blemish concerns. Fango Purificante received a Women's Health Beauty Award in 2026.

=== Other notable products ===
- Power-C Firming and Brightening Serum Capsules: Single-dose 20% vitamin C capsules designed to preserve potency and prevent oxidation. Used backstage at Prabal Gurung's Fall/Winter 2026 New York Fashion Week show.
- Curaforte Moisture Intensifier Serum: A hydration serum positioned as part of the brand's core 'Italian Recipe' skincare routine.
- Fluido Protettivo Advanced Spa Lift for Eyes: Eye cream that received the 'The Eyes Have It' award at the New YOU Beauty Awards in 2026.
- Overnight Resurfacing Mask with AHA and BHA: Launched June 2024. Featured in Elle (2024) and Harper's Bazaar editors' picks (September 2025).

== Corporate affairs ==
=== Ownership and leadership ===
Borghese Inc. is a privately held company headquartered in Midtown, New York City. The company has been privately held since 1992, when it was acquired from Revlon by Halston Borghese International Limited.

=== Retail distribution ===
As of 2025, Borghese products are available in the United States through Neiman Marcus, Bloomingdale's, Dillard's, Macy's, Ulta Beauty, HSN, QVC, Nordstrom, and Amazon, as well as through direct-to-consumer sales via Borghese.com. The brand also serves as the exclusive skincare line at select luxury spas. In the second half of 2024, the brand expanded its U.S. spa presence, adding locations including The Standard Spa, Miami and Frankie Shay Aesthetics in West Hollywood. Internationally, the brand has a presence in China, selling through platforms including Little Red Book, Tmall, Douyin, and JD.com, as well as in Hong Kong and South Africa, with travel retail and duty-free environments identified as expansion targets.

=== Sustainability ===
Borghese has stated a commitment to sustainable packaging, noting that its hero product, Fango Mud mask has been sold in recyclable glass jars for approximately four decades. In 2024 and 2025, the company launched a social campaign encouraging customers to upcycle empty Fango jars.

=== Licensing ===
Borghese licenses its brand across several categories including hotel toiletries, home, bath and beauty accessories and tools.

== Reception and legacy ==
=== Cultural references ===
Borghese products have appeared in American popular culture across several decades. In the television series Sex and the City, the character Miranda Hobbes references Borghese Hand Sheet Masks as part of her 'secret single behavior' in Season 4, Episode 13. The New York Magazine Strategist noted this connection in a 2022 review of the Fango mask, describing Borghese as 'the brand that makes Miranda Hobbes's favorite conditioning gloves.' Mercedes 'MJ' Javid of the Bravo television series Shahs of Sunset publicly described the Fango Active Mud Mask as her 'favorite' mask in a 2020 social media post covered by Bravo. Reality television personality Bethenny Frankel was reported by Page Six in both 2025 and 2026 to endorse the Fango mud mask.

=== Press recognition ===
The Advanced Fango Active Mud Mask has received recognition from several beauty publications. The brand's Overnight Resurfacing Mask was featured in Elle in 2024 and in Harper's Bazaar editors' picks in September 2025. In January 2025, D Magazine described the brand as staging a comeback and characterized Fango as 'undoubtedly the brand's hero product.' In 2025, Borghese was named 'Best Beauty Product – North America' at the World Luxury Spa Awards, its Deep Hydration Hand Sheet Masks won 'Best Hand Care' at the Shape Beauty Awards, and the company was named a finalist for 'Best Amazon Storefront' at the BeautyMatter Awards. In 2026, the Fluido Protettivo Eye Cream won the 'The Eyes Have It' award at the New YOU Beauty Awards, and Fango Purificante received a Women's Health Beauty Award.

=== Fashion partnerships ===
Borghese has partnered with fashion designers for New York Fashion Week. In February 2026, Borghese served as the official skincare partner for Prabal Gurung's Fall/Winter 2026 show, with the Fango Active Mud Mask used backstage on approximately 40 models. In 2025, Borghese was announced as Christian Siriano's first skincare partner for his Spring/Summer 2026 show. The brand previously engaged Italian supermodel Mariacarla Boscono as a brand ambassador in April 2017, a relationship that was not renewed after one year.

== See also ==
- Revlon
