= Borghese Collection =

Art collection owned by the Roman Borghese family

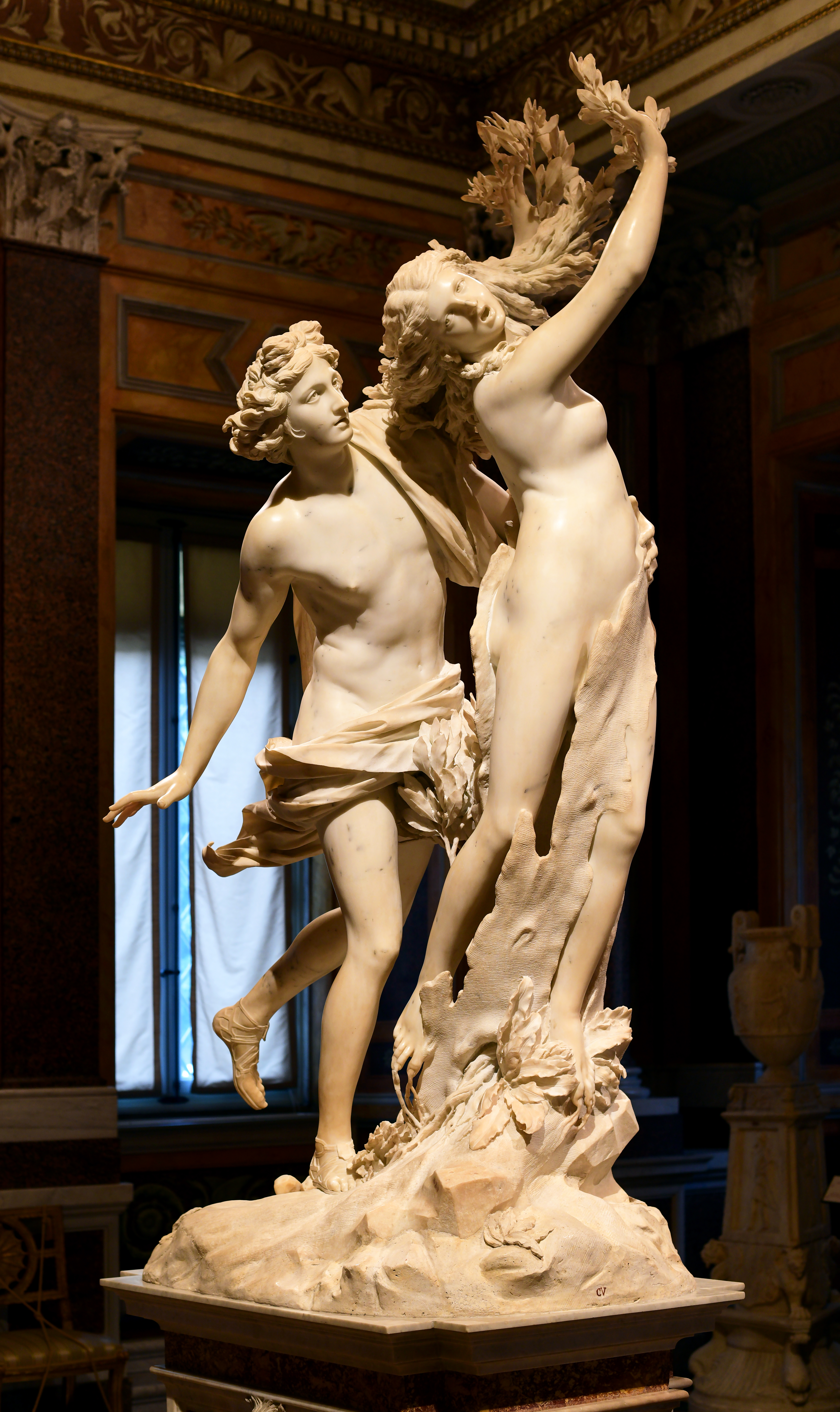
Bernini's Apollo and Daphne in the Galleria Borghese

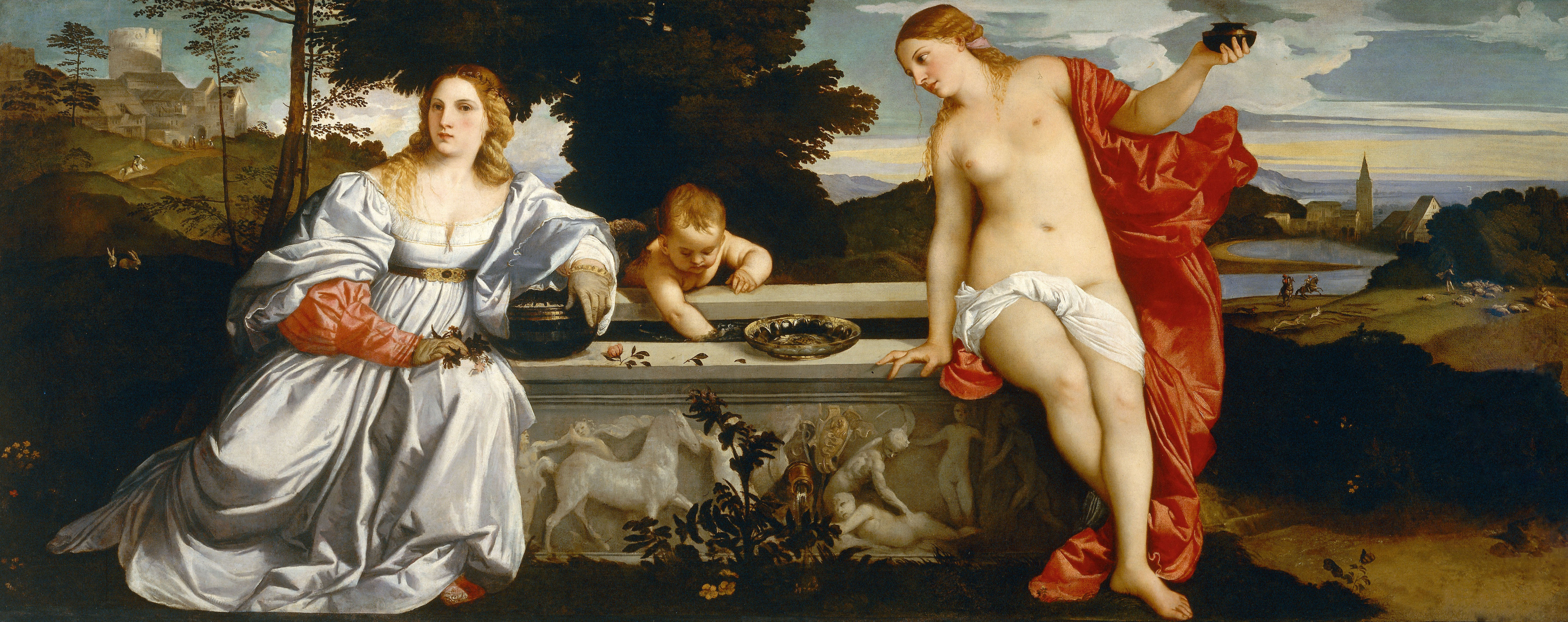
Titian's Sacred and Profane Love

The Borghese Collection is a collection of Roman sculptures, old masters and modern art collected by the Roman Borghese family, especially Cardinal Scipione Borghese, from the 17th century on. It includes major collections of Caravaggio, Raphael, and Titian, and of ancient Roman art. Cardinal Scipione Borghese also bought widely from leading painters and sculptors of his time, and Scipione Borghese's commissions include two portrait busts by Gian Lorenzo Bernini. Most of the collection remains intact and on display at the Galleria Borghese, although a significant sale of classical sculpture was made under duress to the Louvre in 1807.

== Scipione Borghese ==
Cardinal Scipione Borghese, an important art collector, was the collection's instigator and collected the majority of the collection. His collection was poetically described as early as 1613 by Scipione Francucci. In 1607, the Pope gave the Cardinal 107 paintings which had been confiscated from the studio of the painter Cavalier D'Arpino. In the following year, Raphael's Deposition was removed by force from the Baglioni Chapel in the church of San Francesco in Perugia and transported to Rome to be given to the Cardinal Scipione through a papal motu proprio.

== Later additions ==
In 1682, part of Olimpia Aldobrandini's inheritance entered the Borghese collection; it included works from the collections of Cardinal Salviati and Lucretia d'Este.

== Housing the collection ==
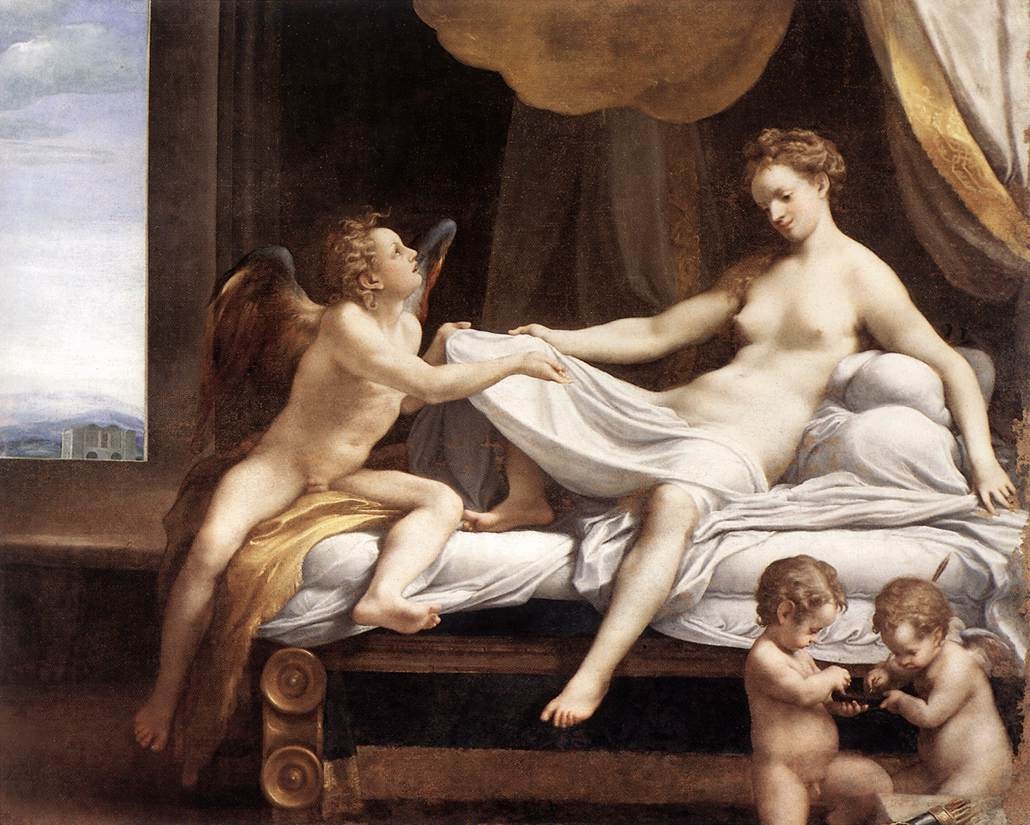
Danaë by Correggio

Scipione developed a large estate and vineyard on the Pincian Hill in Rome into a vast garden and complex of palaces, the Villa Borghese, to house his collection. He also used the Villa Mondragone for this purpose. In 1775, in homage to his Borghese ancestors, Prince Marcantonio IV Borghese and the architect Antonio Asprucci embarked upon renovations to Villa Borghese, which had always been a semi-public museum since the 17th century. Integrating the sculptures of the Borghese collection and existing vast Baroque ceiling decors, they created a spectacular monument to the Borghese family (Paul 2000).

== Galleria Borghese ==
The Villa still houses a major part of the collection, as the Galleria Borghese. Many of the sculptures there are displayed in the spaces they were intended for, including early works by Gian Lorenzo Bernini.

=== Caravaggio paintings ===
- Boy with a Basket of Fruit
- St. Jerome
- Sick Bacchus
- John the Baptist (John in the Wilderness)
- Madonna of the Palafrenieri
- David with the Head of Goliath
- Portrait of Pope Paul V

=== Other notable paintings ===
- Sacred and Profane Love by Titian
- Deposition by Raphael
- Danaë by Correggio
- Portrait of a Man by Antonello da Messina (See also Image)
- Diana by Domenichino
- Venus and Cupid by Cranach
- Circe by Dosso Dossi
- The Deposition by Rubens
- Tobias and the Angel by Savoldo
- Madonna and Child with Saints by Lorenzo Lotto
- The Last Supper by Jacopo Bassano
- Various works by Federico Barocci
- Leda and the Swan by followers of Leonardo da Vinci

=== Bernini collection ===
The small collection of works by Bernini (whose first patron was Scipione) comprises a large proportion of his lifetime output of secular sculpture; in this collection one can see the sponsored Bernini mature from juvenile, but talented works, such as The Goat Amalthea with the Infant Jupiter and a Faun (1615) to his supreme and dynamic Apollo and Daphne (1622–25) and David (1623), considered seminal works of baroque sculpture. In addition, the gallery contains three busts, two of Pope Paul V (1618–20) and one marvellously conversive and stunningly innovative portrait of his patron, Borghese (1632). Finally it has some early, somewhat mannerist, but masterful works such as Aeneas, Anchises, and Ascanius (1618–19) and the Giambologna-emulating Pluto's Rape of Proserpine (1621–22), and also a personal allegory of Truth Unveiled by Time (1646–52).

== At the Louvre ==
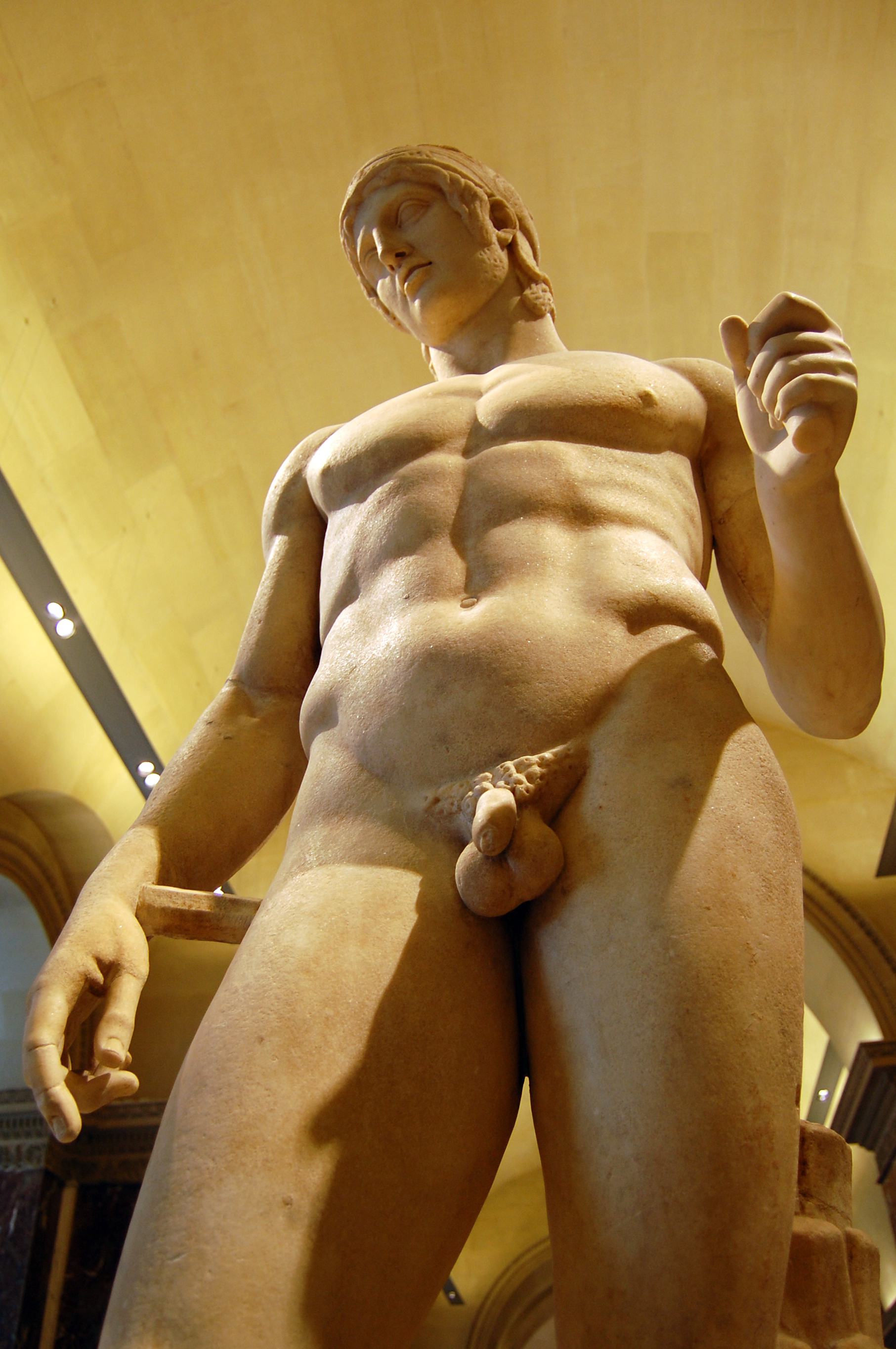
Ares Borghese in the Louvre

In 1807, due to financial difficulties and pressure from his new brother-in-law Napoleon Bonaparte, Camillo Filippo Ludovico Borghese sold 344 antiquities (154 statues - including some major examples -, 160 busts, 170 bas-reliefs, 30 columns and various vases), from the collection to the French state at below their market price. These pieces, which now reside at the Louvre Museum, include:

- sculptures recently excavated at Gabii
- the Antinous Mondragone
- the Borghese Gladiator
- the Borghese Hermaphroditus
- the Borghese Vase

He replaced them in the Villa with other pieces from excavations on Borghese property (e.g. the Gladiator Mosaic, found in 1834) and paintings from his residences' stores and cellars, so that already by the 1830s these gaps seem to have been filled and despite the losses the collection was still reckoned as one of the world's finest. Camillo even bought Correggio's celebrated Danaë in Paris in 1827.
