= Paolo Borghese (1622–1646) =

Italian nobleman

Paolo Borghese (1622/24–1646) was an Italian nobleman of the Borghese family. He was the son of Marcantonio II Borghese (1598–1658) and his wife Camilla Orsini.

Paolo was the first husband of Olimpia Aldobrandini, whom he married in 1638. They had five children:

1. Giovanni Giorgio Borghese
2. Camillo Borghese
3. Francesco Borghese
4. Giovanni Battista Borghese, Principe Borghese (1639-1717) married Eleonora Boncompagni and had issue (including Camillo Borghese, Prince of Sulmona, husband of Pauline Bonaparte).
5. Maria Virginia Borghese (1642-1718) married Agostino Chigi, Prince of Farnese, Duke of Ariccia and had issue.
