= Tirailleurs du Po =

Expeditionary Piedmontese Battalion Po Tirailleurs
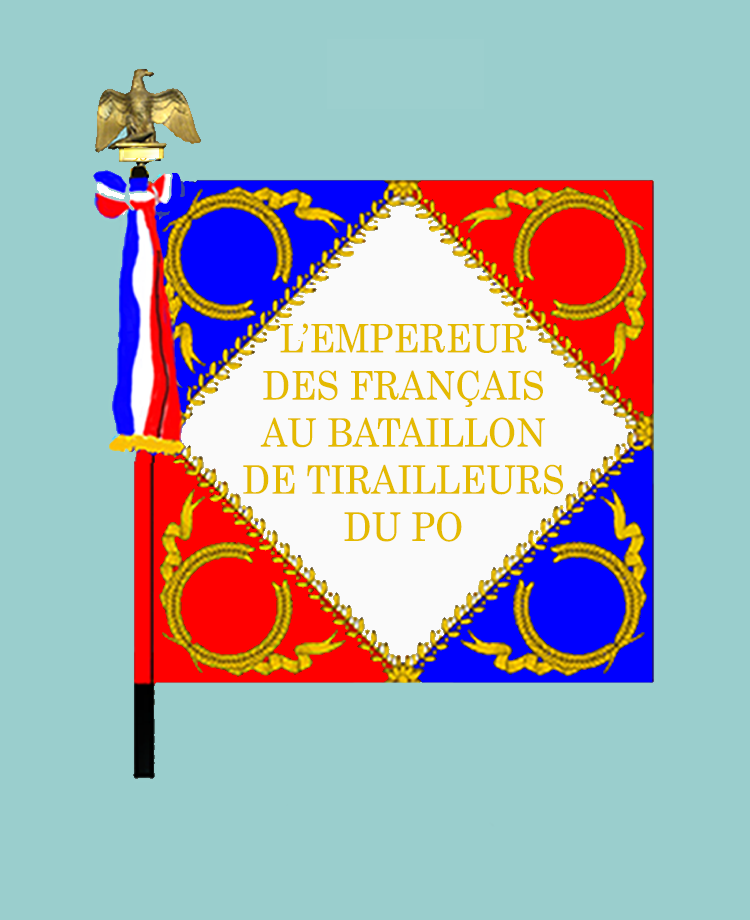
- Regimental Eagle of the Tirailleurs
- Active: 20 April 1803–August 1811
- Country: France
- Branch: French Imperial Army
- Type: Tirailleurs (Light Infantry)
- Size: Battalion
- HQ & Depot: Turin, Piedmont
- Engagements: Napoleonic Wars; War of the Third Coalition; Battle of Austerlitz; War of the Fourth Coalition; Battle of Jena; Battle of Eylau; Battle of Heilsberg; Battle of Königsberg; War of the Fifth Coalition; Battle of Eckmühl; Battle of Wagram

The Tirailleurs du Pô (Note: Note: the "Pô" is only in the French version of the spelling, English and Italian versions only have "Po".) (English: Tirailleurs of the Po) was a specialist light infantry corps of the French Imperial Army, forming part of the Italian Corps of the Foreign Troops Contingent. Though a short-lived unit, the Po Tirailleurs would, along with the Corsican Tirailleurs, serve with distinction in the early campaigns of the Napoleonic Wars. Actions included the Battle of Austerlitz, Jena, Eylau, Heilsberg, and Wagram, where both units were notably engaged. Following a reorganisation of the independent foreign units in 1811, several battalions were merged to form the 11th Light Infantry Regiment, which the Po Tirailleurs continued into.

== Formation ==
Following the dissolution of the old Kingdom of Piedmont-Sardinia, the old Piedmont territory was handed over to the French Empire, and Napoleon immediately took advantage of the situation by recruiting local Italian and French soldiers. Therefore, on 20 April 1803, the Expeditionary Piedmontese Battalion (Bataillon Expéditionare Piémontais) was formed in Turin. The new battalion was formed entirely (minus senior officers) of Northern Italians, the majority of those coming from the Alps and Northern Apennine Mountains. In December 1803, the battalion was retitled the Tirailleurs du Po (Tirailleurs of the Po), named after the Po river, which ran straight through the recruiting grounds (roughly correlating to today's Piacenza, Parma, Lombardy, and Piedmont).

Soon after formation, a regimental recruiting centre and depot were set up in Turin and its establishment was 1,000 men but had only raised 700 men by July 1804. The battalion itself was composed of eight chasseur companies and one of carabiniers.

The battalion's uniform was similar to that of the light demi-brigades (soon to be redesignated as Régiments d'Infanterie de Ligne). Black bicorn with a large red downwards drooped plume with two small red tassels on either end of the bicorne, 'imperial blue' jacket and trousers, red epaulettes, facings, reserves, turnbacks, and cuffs (all with white trim), and white buttons. Carabiniers wore an un-crested bearksin bonnet.

== Third Coalition ==
Unlike the many other foreign battalions in service, or being formed throughout Western Europe by Napoleon, the Po Battalion was immediately sent to the front, arriving in Bavaria by mid-1805.

After arrival, the battalion was grouped with a fellow light infantry unit, the Tirailleurs Corses (Corsican Tirailleurs) and joined the 3rd Division in Maréchal d’Empire Jean-de-Dieu Soult's IV Corps. When Napoleon reviewed the battalion at Ulm at the end of October 1805, he noticed that the unit was in a serious state of disorganisation and decided to take swift remedial action. Napoleon turned to the commander of IV Corps, Marshal Soult and requested to know the name of the officers. Soult replied "Sire, I know just the man, take Hulot". Hulot was initially held in suspicion because of his young age and, but Napoleon and Soult knew he would be perfect, made better by the fact he was in fact a Piedmont.

Several weeks later, Napoleon once again reviewed the battalion quickly noted his satisfaction at the excellent appearance of the unit and the transformation of the men. The new commander quickly became well known in the battalion, and was known to be a good officer, and even spoke Italian to comfort his men. Furthermore, while arriving in Austria the men were surprised to learn Hulot had specially ordered large amounts of polenta, a favourite and local food which they had been deprived of when on campaign. This continued for the remainder of the time Hulot was in command, and became a common place meal when available.

On 16 November, the corps along with the V Corps and Reserve Cavalry [Corps] intercepted a small Austrian-Russian force near Hollabrunn. Both units distinguished themselves and both were noted as "[they] rapidly became a crack battalion". At Hollabrunn, the battalion suffered one officer wounded.

=== Austerlitz ===
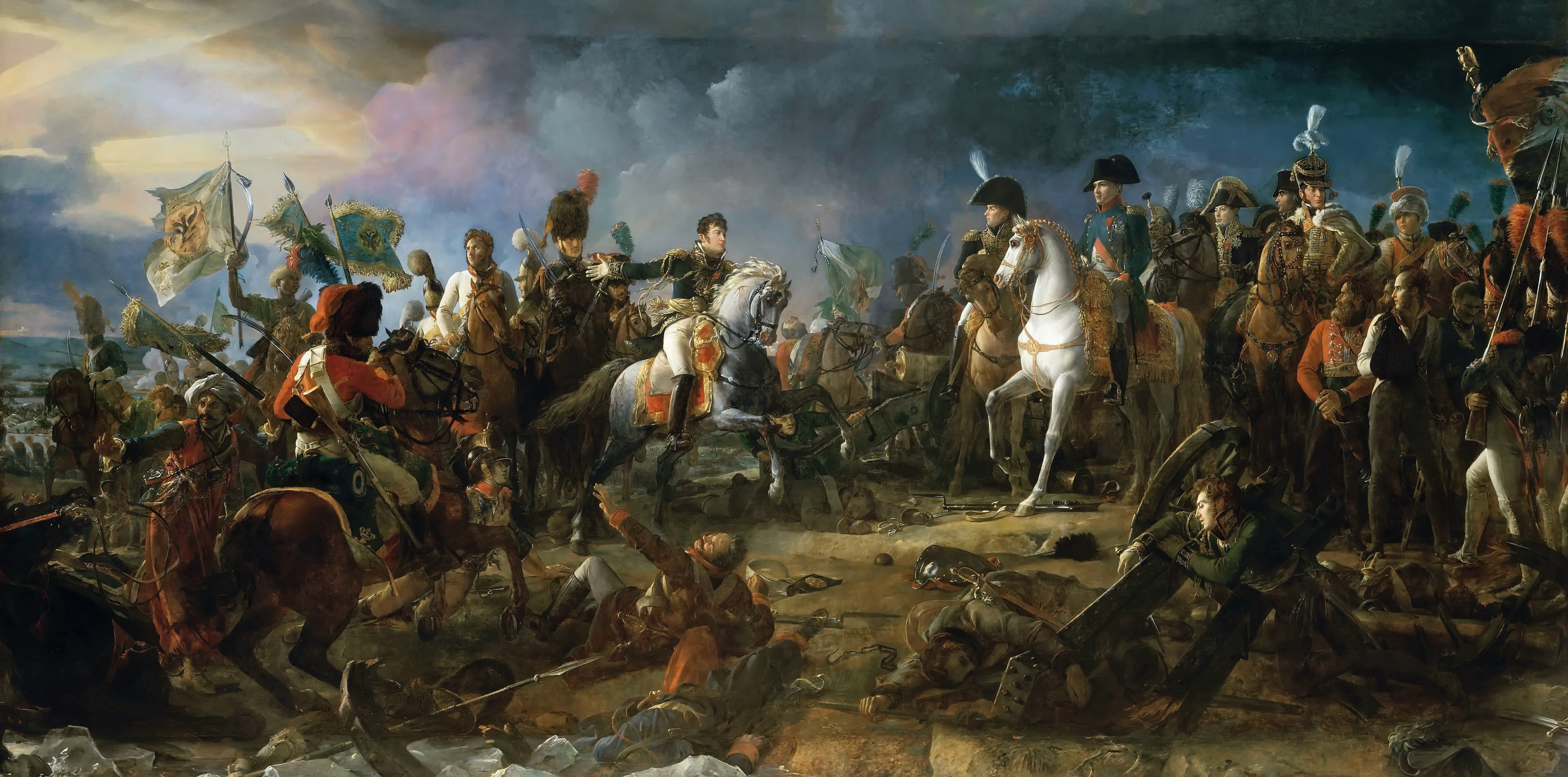
Napoleon and his staff following the end of the Battle of Austerlitz.

On the morning of 2 December, the Tirailleurs du Po were still part of the 3rd Division in Marshal Soult's IV Corps and would play an important role that afternoon. During the night, the corps was discretely moved towards the extreme right flank and was deliberately extended. Legrand's Division was itself split between the villages of Kobelnitz, Zokolnitz, and Tellnitz. The division itself was also extremely spread out, though was assigned a role which they needed to carry out in-order for the battle to go according to Napoleon's plans. The division was tasked with holding back the anticipated Austrian attacked until Marshal Louis-Nicolas Davout's III Corps could come up to its aid. At the same time, the French left would push forward and shift the entire line clockwise.

At 07:00 hours Generalmajor Michael von Kienmayer's advance guard moved towards Tellnitz, and clashed with the garrison. At first all went well for the French, but a little later the bulk of the Russian 1st Column, commanded by Lieutenant General Dmitry Dokhturov (made up of 24 x battalions and around 13,730 men) loomed out of the fog and by 08:00 hours, the 1,2000 survivors of the 3rd Infantry battalion were forced to relinquish their hold on the village. Further north meanwhile, French Royalist General Louis Alexandre Andrault de Langeron and General Przyseweski were in the act of storming Zokolnitz. General Magneron's handful of the Tirailleurs du Po repulsed the first attack and were then reinforced by General Merle's 26th Light Brigade, bringing the garrison to a strength of 1,800 men and 6 x guns. But by 08:30 no less than 30 x enemy cannon had been brought to bear, and a renewed attack by 8,000 allies proved too much for the defense, and so Zokolnitz, in its turn, fell into enemy hands. However, away behind Tellnitz, III Corps commanded by Maréchal d’Empire Louis-Nicolas Davout arrived and was organising a counterattack towards the village.

The 54,000 men of General of Infantry Friedrich Wilhelm von Buxhoeveden's wing were continually getting in each other's way during the early stages due to the fog, and this confusion undoubtedly assisted the sustained defence of Legrand's gallant division. But the fatal consequence of this was that the main attack absorbed every possible soldier that could be spared and deprived the allies of a formed reserve with which to meet unexpected crisis.

During the battle, the Tirailleurs du Po were part of Brigade General Ferey's brigade, part of Division General Claude Juste Alexandre Legrand's Division, itself part of the IV Corps, commanded by Maréchal d’Empire Jean-de-Dieu Soult. The battalion totalled around 308 officers and men during the battle, making it the weakest in the entire corps (as far as infantry). Following the end of the battle, the battalion would be held in high regard and earned a reputation for gallantry for their defence of Napoleon's right wing. In total, the battalion had two officers wounded, along with 29 killed and 154 wounded out of a total strength of only 340.

== Fourth Coalition ==
Before the beginning of the impending conflict, Napoleon passed a series of decrees to set a new general uniform for the army, in addition to several of the new foreign regiments. The new uniform of the battalion was as follows: Dark 'Imperial Blue' tunic, pants, and collars, black shako with a red plume (yellow on top and red bottom for the carabiniers), red epaulettes, facings, cuffs, turnbacks, and small clothes, white shirt, buttons, and trim for turnbacks, and collars. Carabiniers wore an un-crested bearskin bonnet.

=== Prussian Campaign ===
==== Battle of Jena ====
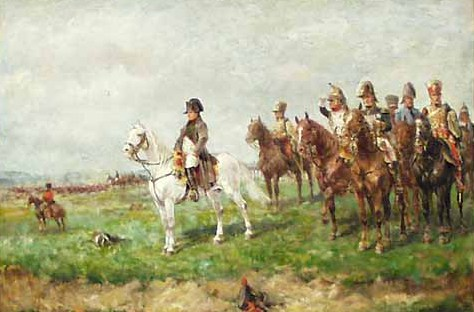
Napoleon and his staff at the Battle of Jena.

In mid 1807, the battalion re-joined the IV Corps, and was placed under command of Divisional General Legrand once more in his 3rd division. When the War of the Fourth Coalition broke out, Soult's IV Corps advanced alongside Napoleon and his Imperial Guard through Saxony. At the town of Jena they met the advance guard Frederick Louis, Prince of Hohenlohe-Ingelfingen's first Prussian field army. The IV Corps, alongside the VI Corps and Bavarian Contingent advanced along the eastern roads towards the town, while the remainder of the army advance from the central and western plains. However, by the time of the beginning of the engagement at Jena, the IV Corps was the farthest, having been near Gera.

The IV Corps was the first (besides Marshal Jean Lannes' V Corps and the Imperial Guard), which had been the first to engage the Prussians. The IV Corps advanced through the town and had to climb steep tracks in-order to reach the plains where Lannes' V Corps had been advancing. By the time Napoleon had his main force move in, the Corps had been holding off Prussian Generalleutnant Julius von Grawert's Right Wing, and around 10:00, the corps secured the town of Closwitz, but was counterattacked on its right flank by Holtzendorff's Division. However, after a decisive charge by cavalry of the VI Corps, the IV Corps was once again able to hold their ground.

Napoleon then order an all out charge, with the IV Corps holding the far (right, by now the north) advancing easily through the Prussian Right Wing. At first, the Prussians kept good discipline, but it soon became a general rout. With the battle over, the Tirailleurs were able to rest, having been able to rout an entire army.

==== North West Push ====
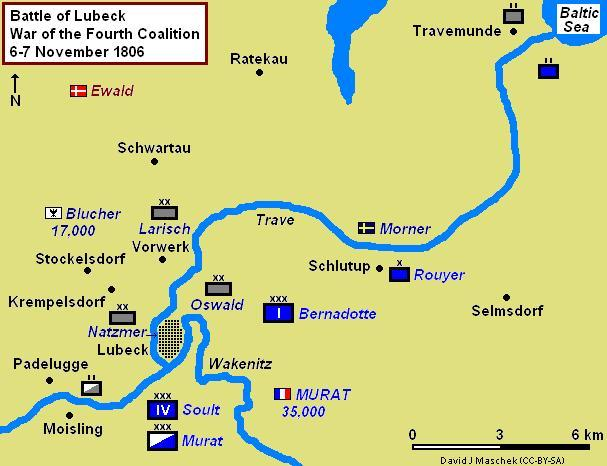
Situation in late 1806 with the French and Allied Forces advancing towards Lübeck.

By 22 October, the two bridgeheads over the Elbe were taken and the Cavalry Reserve, IV, and VI Corps were closing into the fortress of Magdeburg. The battalion subsequently saw service at the Siege of Magdeburg (20 October–10 November), Battle of Rathenau (28 October), Battle of Waren-Nossentin (1 November), Battle of Schwerin (3 November), and finally the Siege of Lübeck (6 November–7 November). On 26 October I Corps, IV Corps, and Reserve Cavalry smashed the Reserve Army of the Prince of Hohenlohe, where he finally surrendered with 14,000 men at the Battle of Prenzlau.

Hot on Gebhard Leberecht von Blücher's heels, the Reserve Cavalry, I Corps, and IV Corps (with some 35,000 troops), along with King Louis Bonaparte of the Kingdom of Holland and Édouard Mortier's VIII Corps advanced from the Rhine through Westphalia and French Hanover and encircle him at Lübeck. The next day, on 6 November, the French forces arrived and their men proceeded to put the hapless free city to the sack, with terrible atrocities being committed. Legrand's Division comprised some 9 battalions during the battle.

=== Poland and East Prussia ===
As Prussian forces routed and surrendered en masse, Napoleon's Grande Armée continued moving east towards the Russo-Austrian-Prussian occupied region of Partitioned Poland. As Napoleon's troops arrived, they were seen as liberators, and soon after the Duchy of Warsaw was created, and IV Corps was quartered between Toruń and Warsaw.

In January 1807, Napoleon began his new campaign against the Russians and Prussians by moving east towards Białystok while both I Corps and VI Corps withdrew, drawing the Russians west towards Danzig and Poznań. IV Corps was sent north to try and encircle the Russian 1st Army. However, treacherous rains and tired troops caused slow progress. Napoleon's courier was caught by Russian cossack2and the Russians promptly withdrew.

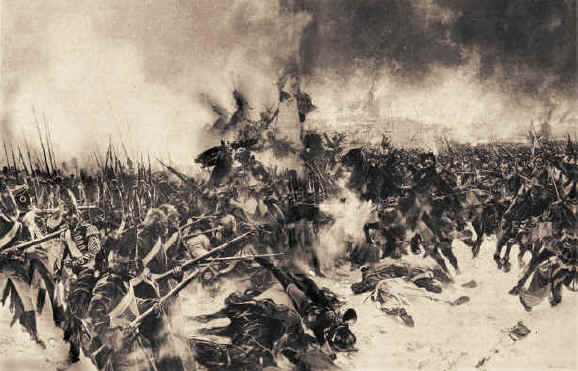
Action at the Eylau, the French cuirassiers of Soult's Cavalry charging the Pavlovsk Grenadiers during the push from the far right flank.

==== Battle of Eylau ====
On 8 February IV Corps arrived in the area of Preußisch Eylau, where a major fight was unfolding. The corps was sent to the far west and began an assault on Russian positions, however the Russians stopped the corps and when the vanguard of III Corps arrived, they were intercepted by the Cavalry Reserve, thereby causing IV Corps to be held up. By 22:00 hours both sides disengaged, with both armies losing at least 15,000 troops, and by 23:00 the Russians withdrew with the French barely victorious.

Though tactically indecisive, the French are widely credited with gaining a pyrrhic victory over the Russians. Soult's IV Corps is also credited with helping 'win' the battle because they were able to divert the majority of the Russian reserve, commanded by Barclay de Tolly.

==== Battle of Heilsberg ====
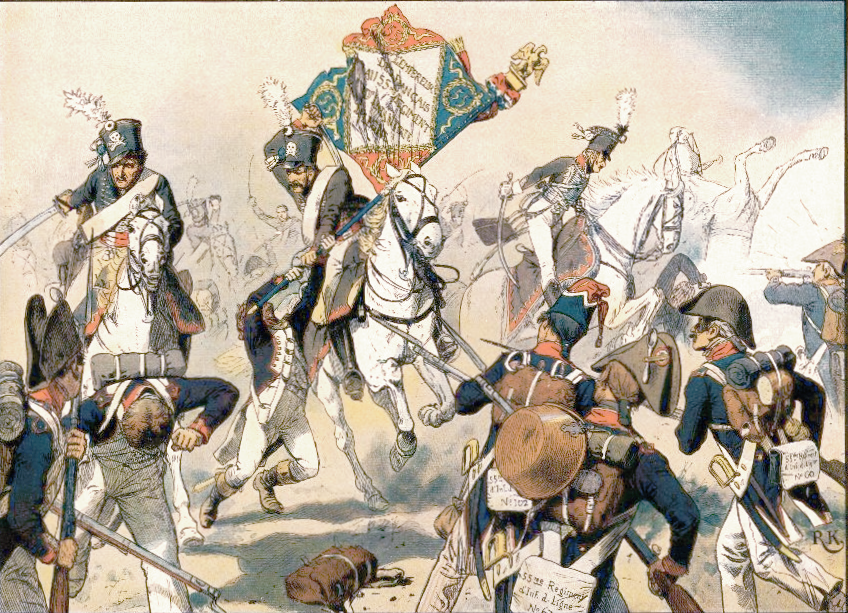
Prussian Hussars steal the regimental colours of the 55th (French) Line Infantry Regiment at the Battle of Heilsberg.

Following a brief pause in action during the Winter and Spring of 1807, the IV Corps returned to their winter quarters near Warsaw. In May Napoleon opened up his plans to invade East Prussia and destroy Levin August von Bennigsen Russian Field Army once and for all. At Heilsberg the two armies met near the River Alle with the IV Corps being the only full 'line corps' engaged. They were joined by Marshal Joachim Murat's Reserve Cavalry Corps, the Imperial Guard's Middle Guard Division along with parts of the second Division, V Corps. The entirety of IV Corps, along with the Tirailleurs du Po were engaged against a strong Russian force.

Napoleon's Advance Force moved towards the town, expected to fight just a small rear-guard of Bennigsen's army. However, Napoleon soon realised that after Ney's failed attack on the actual Russian rear-guard, he had now faced the entirety of Bennigsen's Army. The Tirailleurs du Po were still under Legrand's Division, and would face fear opposition during the battle. Although the Russians had built extensive fortifications on the right (eastern) bank of the Alle, and only a few minor redoubts on the left bank they advance over the river to five battle, thus squandering this advantage and incurring avoidable casualties.

After the initial skirmishes with the Russians, Legrand's division arrived in the area of the 'Lawden Woods', which would become the centre of the battle. The division was reinforced soon after with corps artillery and Maragon's Corps Cavalry brigade. The woods was only defended by three weakened jäger battalions left there by Lieutenant General Feodor Petrovich, Graf von Ovarov. After a long and fierce battle and several bayonet charges made by both sides, the French captured the woods. Tactically it was very important as the woods gave support to the northern flank of the soon to be French line.

The French infantry, notably IV Corps advance several times charging into Russian forces. The 26th Light Infantry battalion was especially brave where they charged a Russian fortified position and captured the redoubt around 19:00 hours. According to the military journal of IV Corps, it was the 26th Lights who took the redoubts and was soon assisted by the Fusiliers-Grenadiers of the Imperial Guard and later the Tirailleurs du Po.

By mid-day, the division was in the area south of the woods and faced General Gorchakov's forces, which held strong positions across from the French. Legrand's division was ordered to assault the positions with support from St Cyr' and St Hilaire's divisions, both from IV Corps.

After taking the former Russian redoubts, the so many prisoners were taken that the division couldn't move any further. Legrand's entire division and Jean Savary's guards cavalry force were forced to hold their position and form a massive square with their newly acquired Prussian and Russian prisoners in the middle. The combined Prusso-Russian cavalry force charged and a bloody melee ensued. The 55th Line Infantry battalion lost its colonel, its battalion eagle and many of its officers before beating off the enemy. However, the squared were continually pummelled and were forced to withdraw back.

After leaving their flank dangerously open, St Hilaire and St Cyr were forced to charge and secure Legrand's flank, which took several hours. By the afternoon, the entire French line was steadily forced back, though the Russians weren't able to chase them, exhausted, and now severely injured. According to their casualty return the French lost 1,391 killed, 10,059 wounded, and 864 captured. The IV Corps alone lost 8,286 men, several high-profile generals were also killed in this corps.

==== Battle of Königsberg ====
Though the French had been beaten, the Russians were in a dire situation and severely hindered by their losses. They were therefore forced to withdraw and leave Königsberg open, though the Prussians felt different. Anton Wilhelm von L'Estocq's Corps had escaped from the battle mostly intact, but like the Prussian Army which had fought Napoleon the previous year, it was badly lead, suffered from a lock of staff, and was extremely old-fashioned.

L'Estocq's Corps therefore retired to Königsberg and prepared for a siege while a combined Anglo-Russo-Swedish would assist, or at least that was the plan. On 14 June, IV Corps along with the 2nd Cuirassier, 3rd Dragoon, and Light Cavalry Divisions of Murat's Cavalry Reserve joined IV Corps (minus St Hilaire's 1st Division) near Königsberg and began to siege the city. Just one day later the terribly organised Prussian defence crumbled, with historian Digby Smith describing the Prussian conduct as "appalling".

The French losses were known, but light, while Prussian losses totalled around 300 killed, wounded, and captured. This would be the last major pitched battle the Tirailleurs were engaged in during the campaign.

=== Later changes ===
Following the losses sustained by the battalion, recruitment was spread to the other French Italian départments and the openings were quickly filled. During its history, in particular conditions, the department came to count 1,300–1,500 effective even if obviously in the campaigns this number tended to drop significantly.

== War of the Fifth Coalition ==
After two years of peace, hostilities once again broke out in Germany when the Austrian Empire once again declared war on France. Before the outbreak of hostilities, the battalion moved back to Turin and recruited back up to strength, replacing the losses it had suffered during the 1806–1807 Prussian campaign.

=== Danube Campaign ===
In January 1809, the battalion was withdrawn from Turin and re-joined the reformed IV Corps, now under command of the flamboyant André Masséna, Duke of Rivoli based in Strasbourg on the border of the Rhine. The reformed corps joined the reformed Army of Germany shortly thereafter and moved across the Rhine into the Confederation of the Rhine. In early March, IV Corps was ordered to Ulm in preparation for the upcoming war.

On 17 April, IV Corps along with Divisional General Nicolas Count of Oudinot's II Corps began moving towards Pfaffenhofen to provide a right flank attack force again the Austrians advancing towards Abensberg. On the 19th, IV Corps was in the area of Geisenfeld and force marched towards the town of Landshut in the east, planning to cut the Austrian's line of retreat towards the Isar.

After the victory at the Battle of Eckmühl, IV Corps was again on the move, now staying south of the Danube and moving towards Linz in Austria. By this point the entirety of the French Army of Germany was advancing towards Ebersberg, but Massena made a mistake. Massena wasn't aware that Marshal Jean Lannes' II Corps had crossed the river several miles south, and was forced to carry out a head-one charge across a small bridge in Ebersberg. Here, the Tirailleurs du Po were part of the 3rd Division and lost one officer killed, one mortally wounded, and eight wounded. IV Corps had heavily hit, but had in the end won the day. The battalion especially distinguished itself by being part of the first group of troops to charge the bridge, and were awarded for their courage and bravery. The 3rd Division, commanded by Michel Claparède along suffered 850 killed, 1,200 wounded, and 800 captured.

=== Moravian Campaign ===
On 9 May, the Tirailleurs were engaged in a skirmish just outside of Vienna, the capital of the Austrian Empire, where 3 officers were wounded. The next day, the French captured the city after the beforementioned skirmish and threat of bombardment.

During the Battle of Wagram, the battalion's last action, one officer was killed (CdB Gassa), three mortally wounded (one of which was CdB Falguières), and four officers wounded. Rather unusually, the battalion doesn't appear in any orders of battle regarding the French Forces present at Wagram. However, it is clear members of the battalion did in-fact serve there.

== Disbandment ==
Throughout the end of 1809, 1810, and into 1811 the battalion returned to Piedmont and brought back up to strength, however recruitment proved to be a difficult issue. Therefore, in August 1811 the battalion was amalgamated with the Valasian Battalion (Swiss), Corsican Tirailleurs, conscripts from Corsica and Piedmont, and the deport of the Légion du Midi to form the new 11th Light Infantry Regiment.

== Regimental honours ==
Though not emblazoned on the regimental colours or eagle, the following actions were granted as honours to the battalion: Austerlitz, Eylau, and Wagram. All of these honours were taken over by the 11th Light Infantry.

== Commanders ==
The battalion was, rather unusually, commanded by a Regimental Chef, and not a colonel as normal for a battalion.

- 20 April 1803 – 24 January 1804, Chef de Bataillon Camillo Borghese, 6th Prince of Sulmorna and Rossano (retired) – held position of Governor of Piedmont between 1800 and 1814, married to Napoleon's sister, Pauline Bonaparte
- 24 January 1804 – 15 June 1805, Chef de Bataillon Bernard Cattanéo (left, joined Royal Corsican Regiment)
- 15 June 1805 – 31 October 1805, Chef de Bataillon Brun-Cussan
- 1 November 1805 – 22 March 1807, Chief de Bataillon Étienne Hulot de Mazerny
- 23 March 1807–May 1809, Chef de Bataillon Chenaud
- May 1809–5 July 1809, Chef de Bataillon Gassa (killed at Wagram)
- 5 July 1809 – 6 July 1809, Chef de Bataillon Falguières (mortally wounded at Wagram on the 2nd day)
- October 1809–July 1811, Chef de Bataillon Mano (raised from the ranks of Lieutenant in the regiment)

== Footnotes ==
Notes

Citations
