= Tirailleur =

Indigenous infantry recruited in the French colonial territories

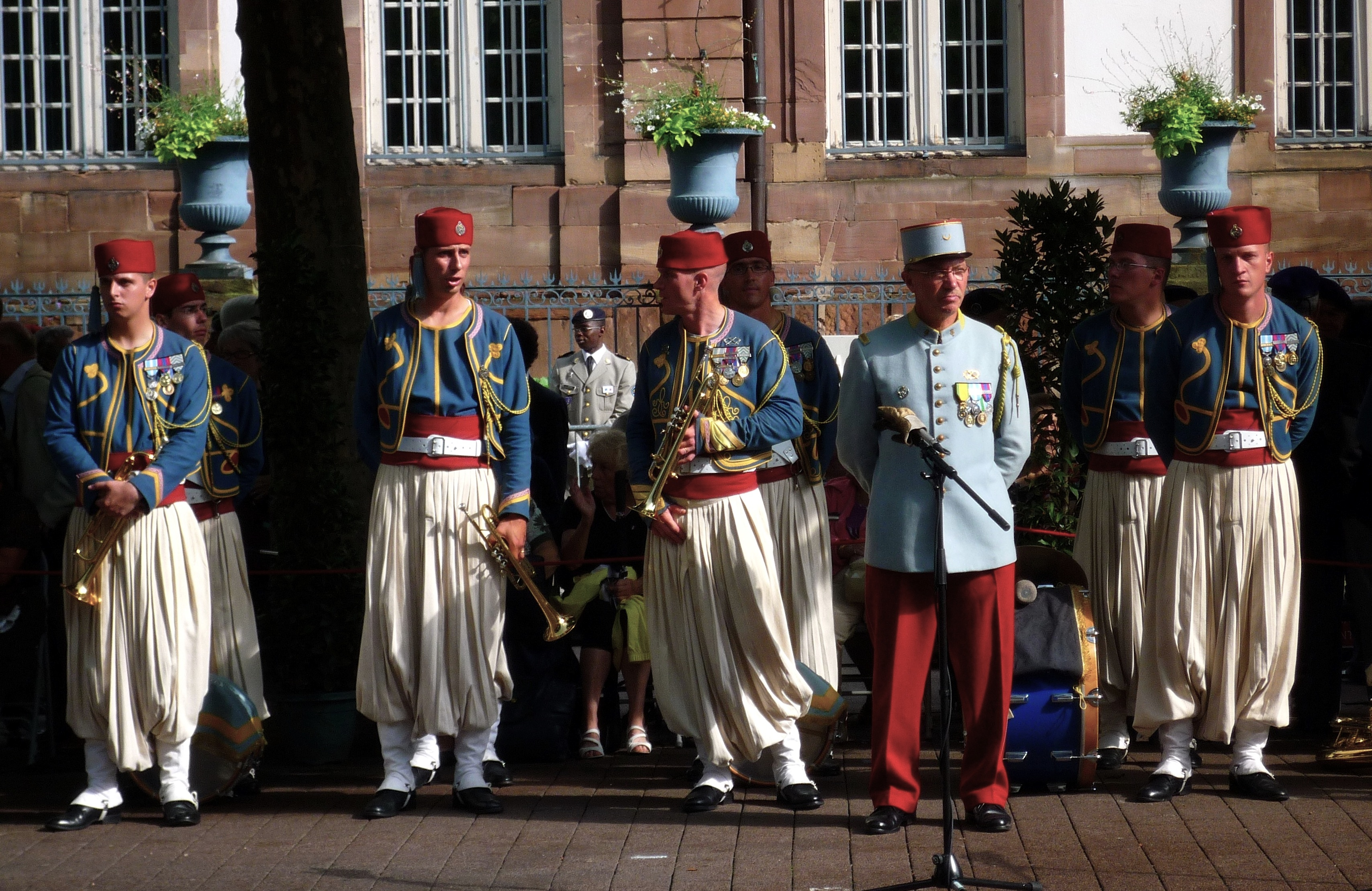
Soldiers of the 1st Tirailleur Regiment of Épinal displaying late 19th- to early 20th-century uniforms for the Bastille Day military parade.

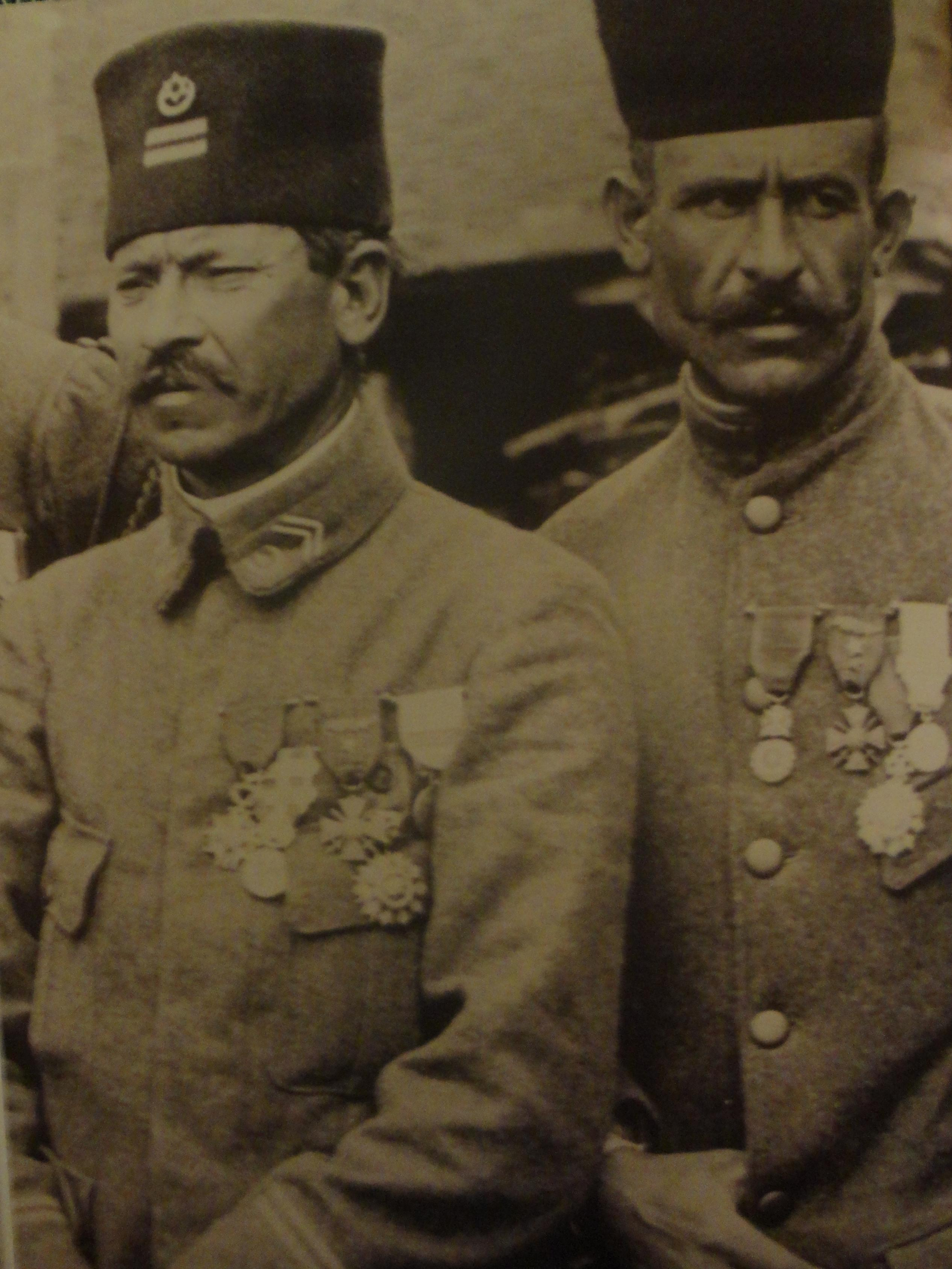
Tunisian lieutenant and tirailleur from the 4th RTA during the First World War (1917) - Both of them are highly decorated (Legion of Honour, Médaille militaire, Croix de guerre with palm)

A tirailleur (French: [tiʁajœʁ] 'skirmisher'), in the Napoleonic era, was a type of light infantry trained to skirmish ahead of the main columns. Later, the term "tirailleur" was used by the French Army as a designation for indigenous infantry recruited in the French colonial territories during the 19th and 20th centuries, or for metropolitan French units serving in a light infantry role.

The French army currently maintains one tirailleur regiment, the 1st Tirailleur Regiment. This regiment was known as the 170th Infantry Regiment between 1964 and 1994. Prior to 1964, it was known as the 7th Algerian Tirailleur Regiment, but changed its name after moving to France following the Évian Accords.

== History ==
=== Napoleonic period ===
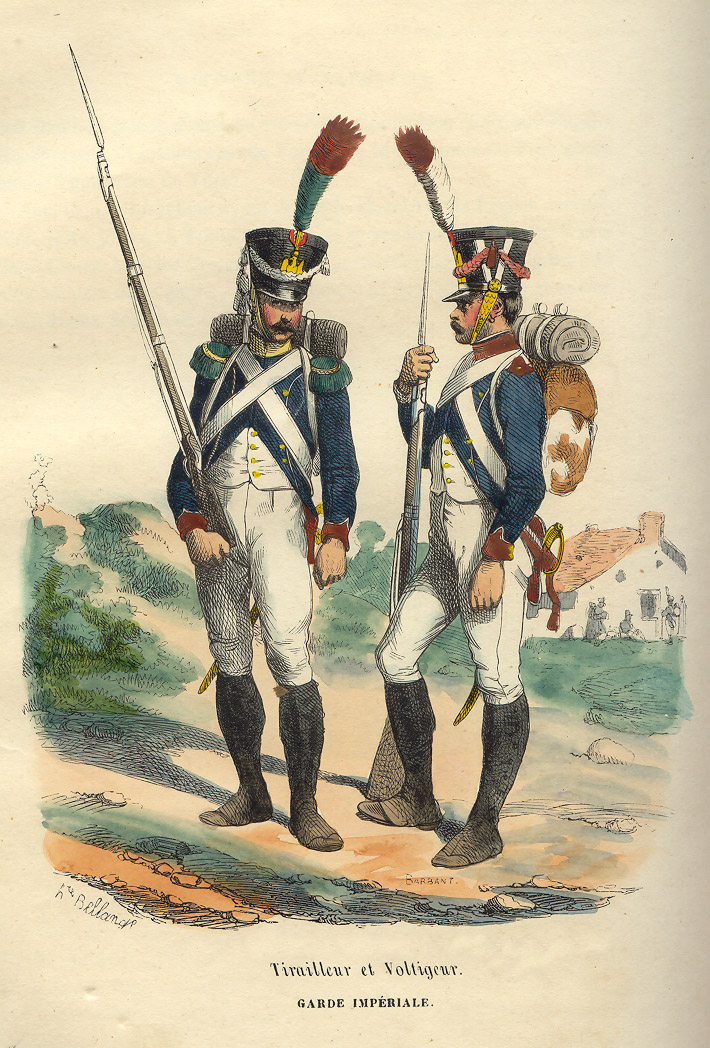
A tirailleur (right) and a voltigeur of the Young Guard.

In the wars of the French Revolutionary and Napoleonic periods, the designation "tirailleur" was a French military term used at first to refer generically to light infantry skirmishers. The first regiments of Tirailleurs so called were part of the Imperial Guard of Napoleon I. By the fall of the Empire, some 16 regiments had been created. The Guard Tirailleurs were usually grouped as part of the Young Guard, along with their sister Voltigeur regiments.

The Guard Tirailleur regiments were disbanded during the reorganization of the French Army in 1814 by the new royal government. On 28 March 1815, during Napoleon I's short-lived return to power (the Hundred Days), Regiments 1-8 of the Guard Tirailleurs were officially re-raised. Only the 1st and 3rd Regiments actually took the field for the Waterloo campaign. All regiments of Imperial Guard Tirailleurs (along with the rest of the Guard) were disbanded following the Emperor's second abdication.

In addition to the regiments within the Imperial Guard, several foreign battalions of tirailleurs were raised, included the Italian Tirailleurs du Po and Corsican Tirailleurs Corses.

=== Colonial period ===
==== Origins ====
The first tirailleurs employed in French North Africa were a metropolitan light infantry unit — the 1er bataillon de tirailleurs de Vincennes which disembarked in Algiers in early 1840. This unit subsequently became the chasseurs d'Orléans but the title of tirailleurs was allocated the next year to newly raised regiments of indigenous Algerian infantry recruited from the Arab and Berber communities.

==== Algerian, Tunisian and Moroccan tirailleurs ====
The tirailleurs from French Algeria subsequently served in the Crimean War, the Second Italian War of Independence, the French intervention in Mexico and the Franco-Prussian War (1870), as well as in French colonial campaigns in Tunisia, Indochina, Morocco, Madagascar and Algeria itself. During the Crimean War, Algerian tirailleurs acquired the nickname Turcos 'Turks', by which they were widely known over the next hundred years. The name reportedly arose from comparisons between the Algerian troops and the Turkish allies serving alongside the French and British forces at the Siege of Sevastopol (1854–1855).

First raised in 1841 as battalions of tirailleurs indigenes, the locally recruited Algerian infantry were organised into three regiments of Algerian Tirailleurs by a decree dated 10 October 1855. The number of such units fluctuated over the next hundred years until in the early 1960s eight regiments of tirailleurs plus a number of independent battalions remained in French service. Two battalions of Algerian Tirailleurs formed the bulk of the Détachement Français de Palestine et de Syrie that participated in the Sinai and Palestine campaign from 1917 onwards.

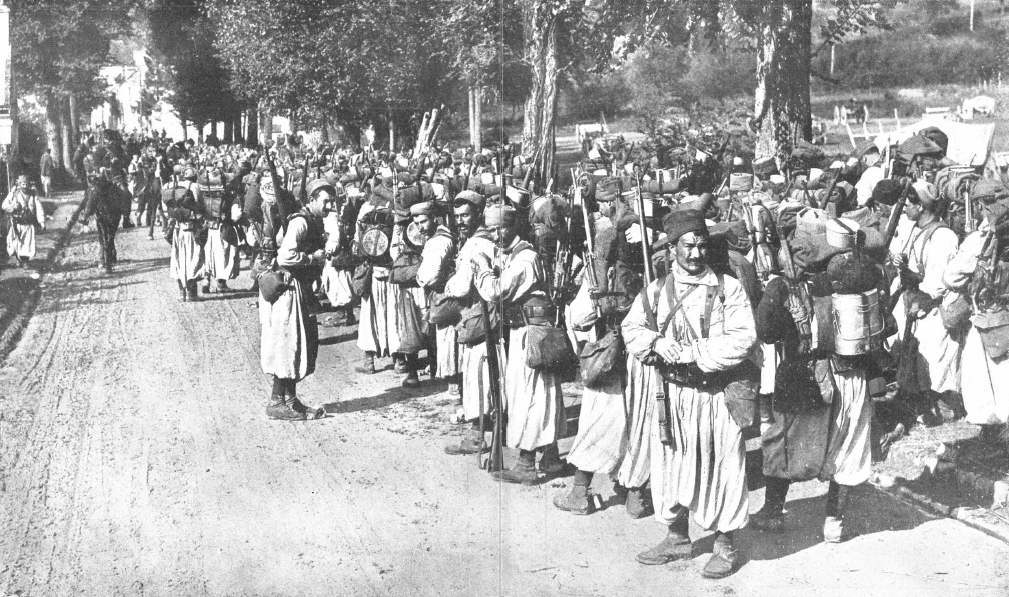
Algerian tirailleurs in France in 1914

In 1884, the 4th Regiment of Tirailleurs was created in Tunisia. Except for minor distinctions in insignia and uniform (their numbering was based on the figure "4" and its multiples, plus light-blue tombeaus (false pockets) on their full-dress zouave jackets), Tunisian tirailleurs regiments had the same appearance as their Algerian counterparts. It was only in 1921 that the French government decided to name them officially "Tunisian Tirailleurs Regiments".

In 1914, during World War I, the 1st Regiment of Moroccan Tirailleurs was created. At the end of the French protectorate in Morocco in 1956, six regiments of Moroccan tirailleurs were still in existence.

The recruitment of Muslim tirailleurs was mainly voluntary with enlistment for three year periods (five for NCOs), although a limited form of conscription by ballot was introduced in Algeria in 1913 and continued until the end of the era of colonial French North Africa. Prior to 1939 up to 90% of the rank and file of each battalion had been indigenous. The proportion of European French (both from metropolitan France and pieds-noirs) to Maghrébin (North African) personnel had, however, increased to about 30% by the end of World War II, as the tirailleur units became increasingly mechanized.

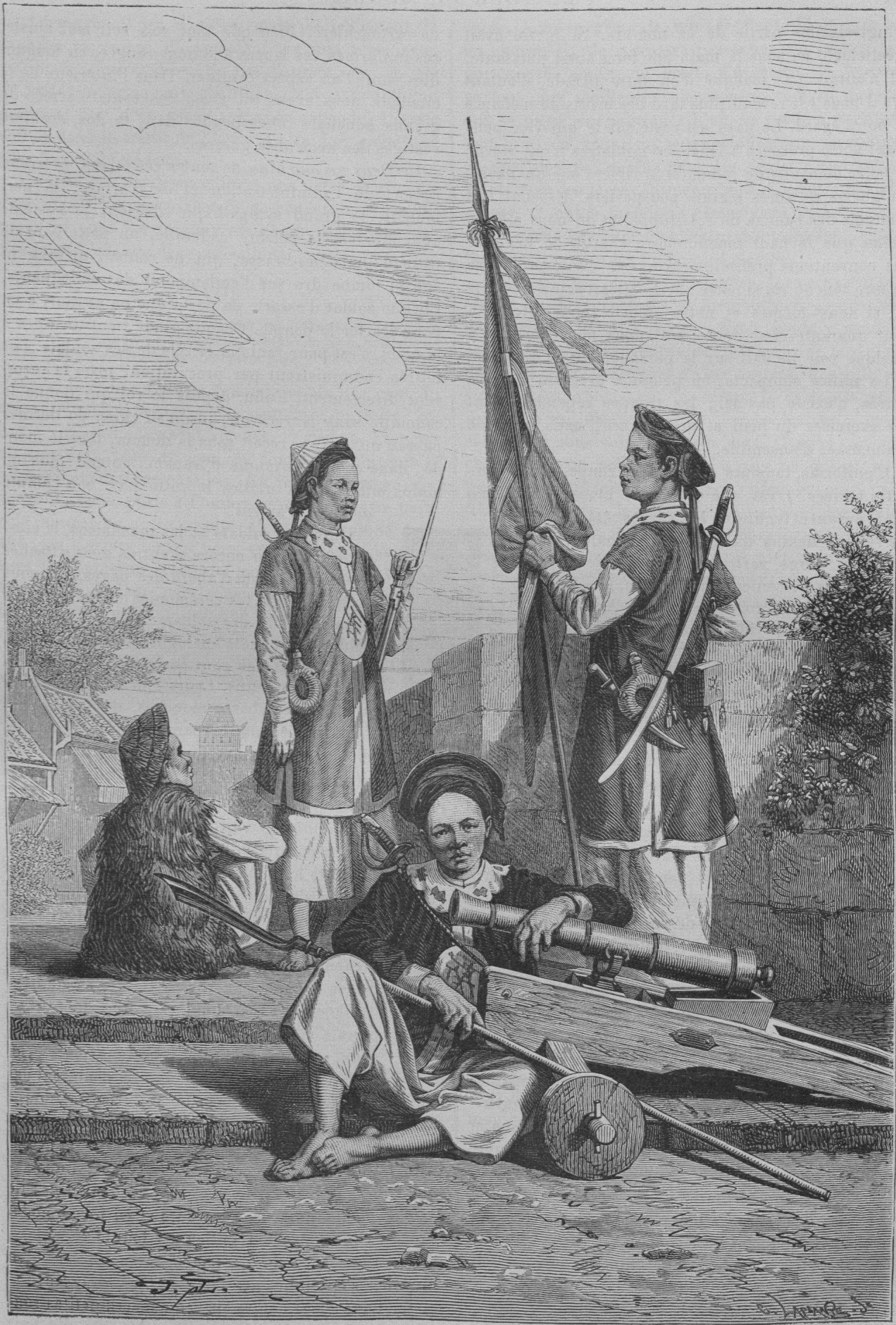
Vietnamese Tirailleurs of Nguyễn Phúc Ánh (later enthroned as Gia Long of Nguyễn Vietnam), circa 1800.

==== Senegalese tirailleurs ====
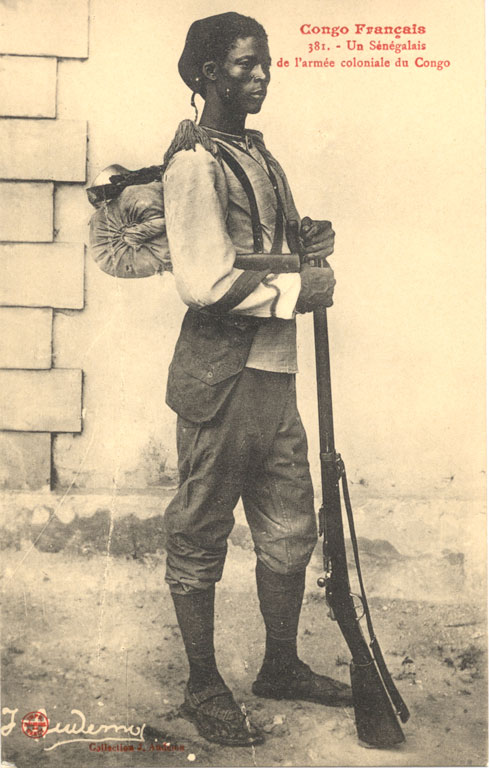
French Congo. A Senegalese tirailleur of the French colonial army. c. 1905. The uniform is the hot-weather light khaki with yellow braiding.

France made extensive use of tirailleurs in its colonial campaigns. The most numerous of these, after the "tirailleurs algériens" noted above, were the "tirailleurs sénégalais" (who were recruited from all of the French possessions in West and Central Africa). Both played an important role in the occupation of Morocco (1908–14) as well as in the Rif War of the 1920s.

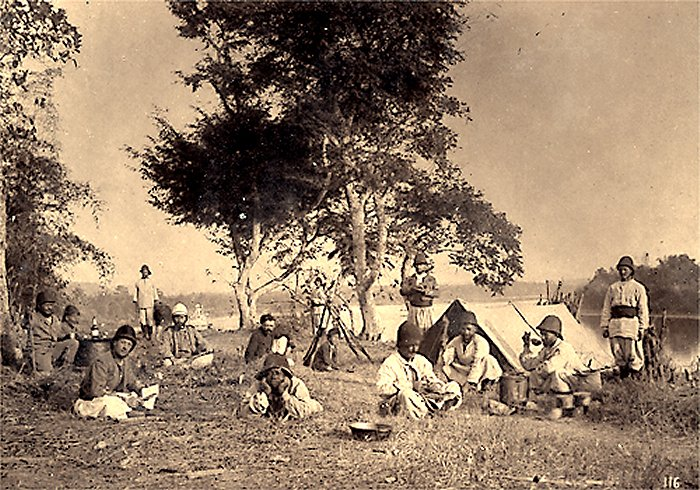
Algerian riflemen in Tonkin, 1884

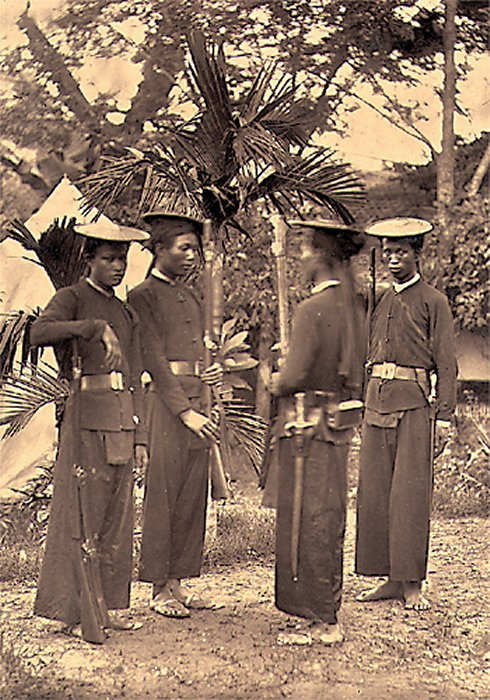
Tonkinese riflemen in Tonkin, 1884

==== Tirailleur regiments from other French colonies ====
Before and during World War II (1939–45), tirailleurs were recruited from the Maghreb (Algerian, Moroccans, and Tunisians), from French West Africa and Madagascar (Tirailleurs malgaches).

==== Tirailleurs Indochinois ====
Regiments were recruited from the regions of French Indochina: Annam, Tonkin, and Cambodia. The regiments were named after the territory in which they were recruited. Thus "tirailleurs Annamites", "tirailleurs Tonkinois" and "tirailleurs Cambodgiens".

==== World War I ====
During World War I (1914–18) tirailleurs from North African territories served on the Western Front, Salonika and in the Levant, incurring heavy losses. In spite of its title, the Moroccan Division (France) which fought on the Western Front contained Tirailleur battalions from all North African regions. The Great Mosque of Paris was constructed afterwards in honour of the Muslim tirailleurs who had fought for France.

==== World War II and subsequent campaigns ====
Tirailleurs from North and Central Africa fought with distinction in Europe during World War II, notably in the Italian campaign. The Indo-Chinese tirailleur regiments were destroyed or disbanded following the Japanese coups against the French colonial administration in March 1945. Algerian, Moroccan and Senegalese tirailleurs served in Indo-China until the fall of Dien Bien Phu and subsequently as part of the French forces during the Algerian War of Independence (1954–62). Even after the French withdrawal from Indochina, a unit of mostly Vietnamese tirailleurs ("le Commando d'Extreme Orient Dam San") continued to serve with the French Army in Algeria until 1960.

==== Disbanding tirailleur regiments ====
Most tirailleur regiments were disbanded as French colonies and protectorates achieved independence between 1956 and 1962. In Morocco, Tunisia and the new African states most serving tirailleurs transferred directly from the French armed forces to the new national armies. In Algeria locally recruited tirailleurs who remained loyal to France were given an option to transfer to units in France, or join a transitional force locale at the end of the Algerian War in 1962. The six remaining Algerian tirailleur regiments (RTA) were disbanded or transformed into metropolitan infantry units between 1962 and 1964. The last Moroccan regiment in the French Army was the 5th RTM (Regiment de Tirailleurs Marocain), stationed at Dijon until it disbanded in 1965.

The modern French Army still has one tirailleur regiment, descended from the Algerian tirailleurs. While these troops are now all French, items of the traditional North African uniform are still worn on ceremonial occasions to commemorate the Algerian "Turcos" who served France for over 130 years. The traditions of the tirailleurs Senegalais are maintained by the 21eme Regiment d'infanterie de marine stationed in Fréjus, via the 4e Régiment de Tirailleurs Sénégalais of the Second World War.

== Uniforms ==
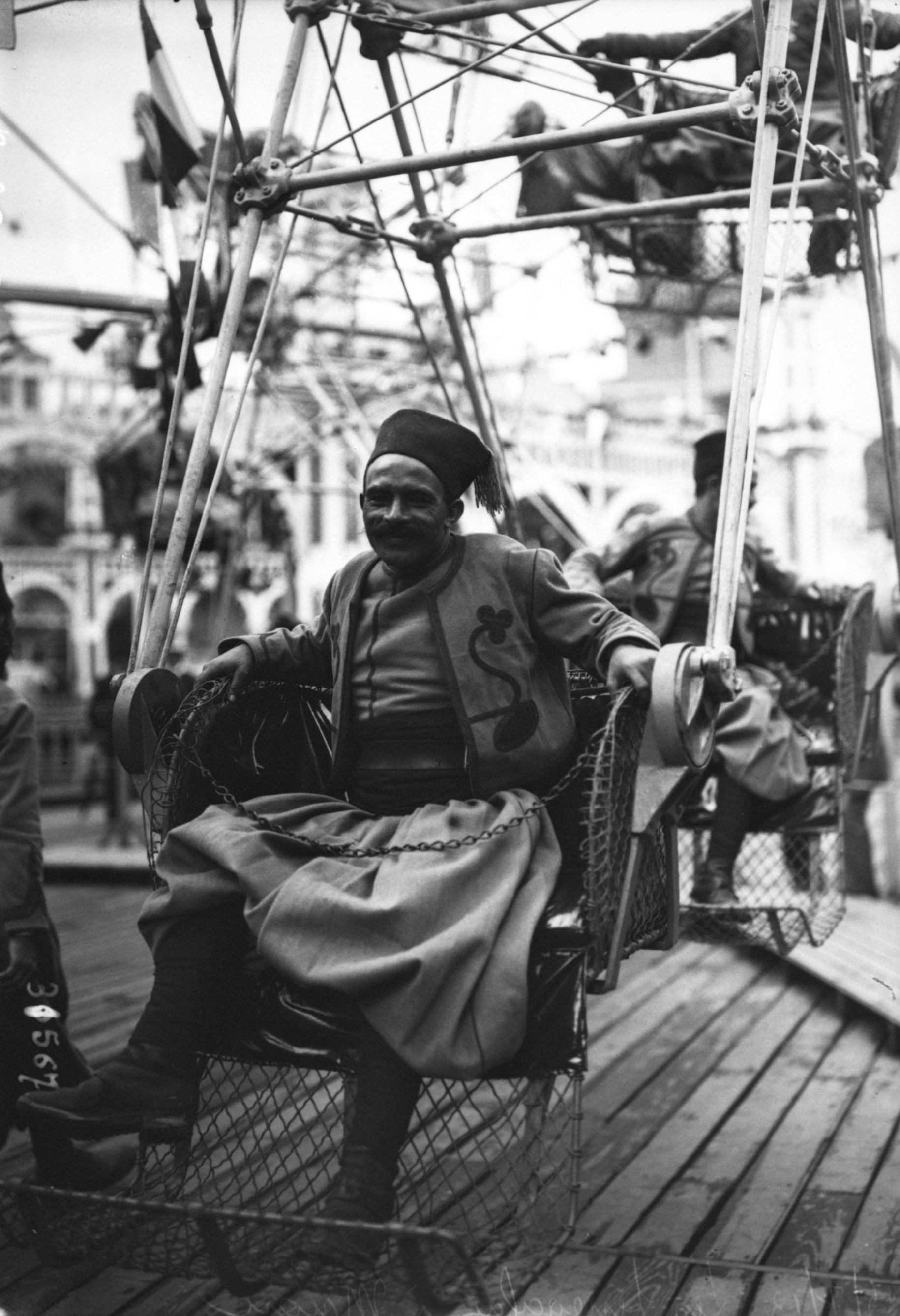
Algerian tirailleurs at Magic-City, Paris, 1913.

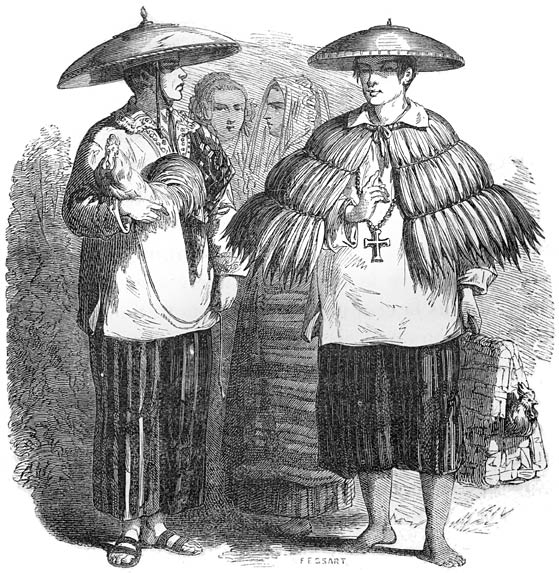
Tagalog people wearing salakot, c. 1855

Until 1914, the Algerian and Tunisian tirailleurs wore zouave-style uniforms of light blue with yellow braiding (see photographs on this page). White turbans for parade dress, red fezzes for daily wear, and sashes were worn with this tenue orientale. A white combat uniform of similar loose cut was worn for North African campaigning and in France during the early months of World War I. They adopted a more practical khaki uniform from 1915 onwards, in common with the other units of the (North African) 19th Military District.

West African and Madagascan tirailleurs wore a dark blue parade dress with a red sash and a fez, while the French Indochina regiments wore an indigenous-style blue, white, or khaki uniform with salakot. Khaki had been widely worn as a hot-weather field dress in Indochina and Africa during the years before the outbreak of World War I, and thereafter became the norm. The North African tirailleurs, however, resumed their colourful full dress uniforms between 1927 and 1939 to assist recruitment. After World War II, they were retained for wear by the noubas (regimental bands) until the present day.

== Decorations ==
In France, citations made during World War I, World War II or colonial conflicts were accompanied with awards of a Croix de Guerre (Cross of War) with attachments on the ribbon depending on the degree of citation: the lowest being represented by a bronze star (for those who had been cited at the regiment or brigade level) while the highest degree is represented by a bronze palm (for those who had been cited at the army level). A unit can be mentioned in Despatches. Its flag is then decorated with the corresponding Croix. After two citations in Army Orders, the men of the unit concerned are all entitled to wear a fourragère.

Regiments of North African Tirailleurs were, together with regiments of Zouaves, amongst the most decorated units in the French Army, ranking after only the Colonial Infantry Regiment of Morocco and the Foreign Legion March Regiment.

=== Médaille militaire ===
As for the Légion d'honneur, this unit award should not be confused with the fourragère in the colors of the Médaille militaire. It is one of the rarest unit awards in the French military.

- 2nd Regiment of Algerian Tirailleurs (1919)

=== Légion d'honneur ===
The Order is the highest decoration in France. In the case of a regiment, its flag is decorated with the insignia of a knight, which is a different award than the fourragère in the colors of the Légion d'honneur. Only 34 French Infantry Regiments were decorated with the Légion d'honneur including seven Regiment of North-African Tirailleurs.

- 1st Regiment of Algerian Tirailleurs (1948)
- 2nd Regiment of Algerian Tirailleurs (1902)
- 3rd Regiment of Algerian Tirailleurs (1863)
- 4th Regiment of Algerian Tirailleurs (1919)
- 7th Regiment of Algerian Tirailleurs (1919)
- 4th Regiment of Zouaves and Tirailleurs (1919)
- 1st Regiment of Moroccan Tirailleurs (1949)
- 1st Regiment of Senegalese Tirailleurs (1913)

=== Fourragère ===
==== World War I ====
Among the 17 French regiments that won the Fourragère in the colors of the Légion d'honneur (at least six citations in Army Orders), nine of them were from the Army of Africa including four regiments of North African Tirailleurs (2nd, 4th, 7th Tirailleurs and 4th Zouaves and Tirailleurs).

By the end of the war, all the 16 North African Tirailleur regiments existing as of August 1918 (12 Algerian/Tunisian, 2 Moroccan and 2 Zouaves and Tirailleurs), were awarded a Fourragère (at least 2 citations in Army Orders). Only one regiment of Senegalese Tirailleurs were awarded a Fourragère in 1919.

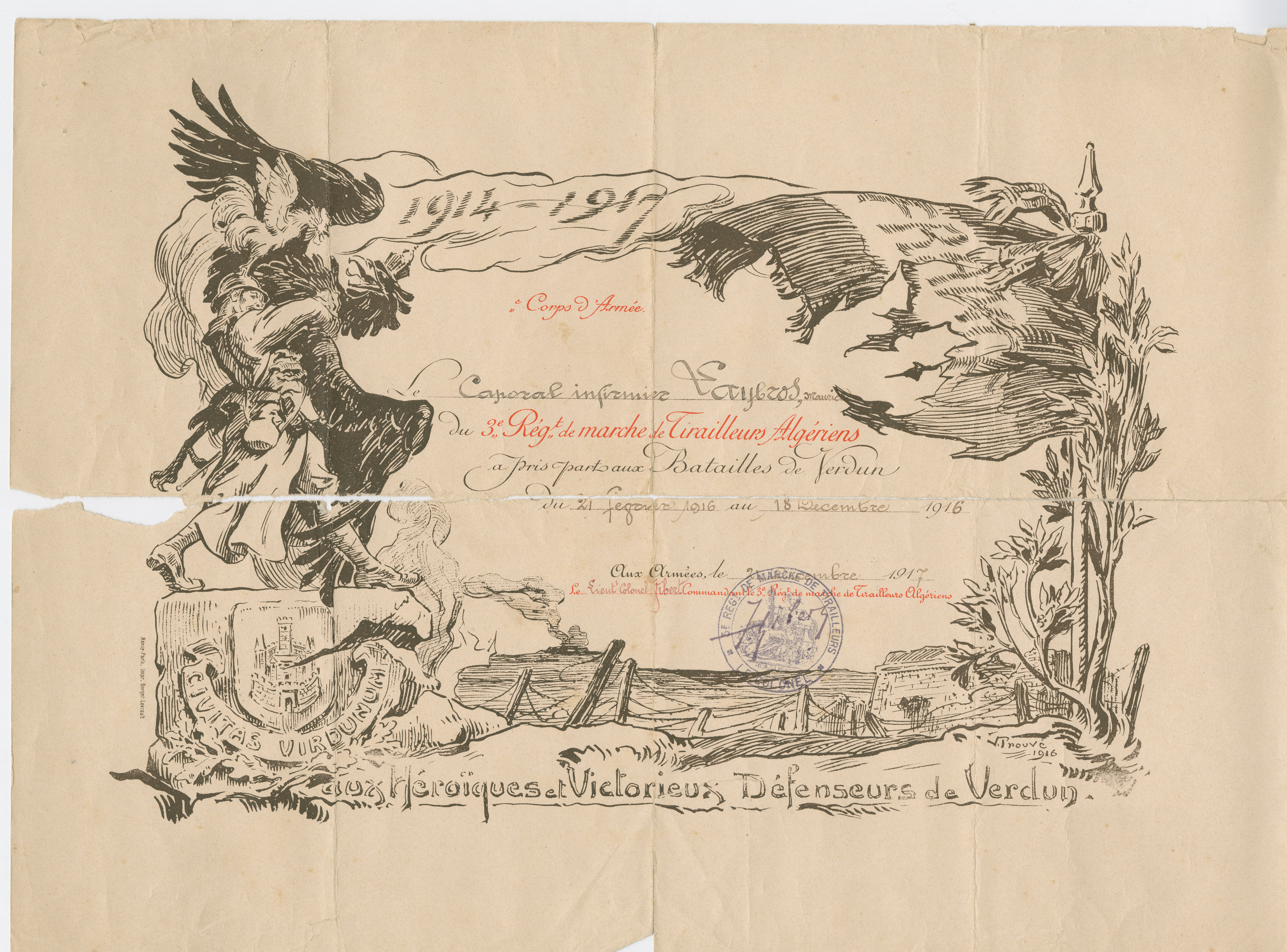
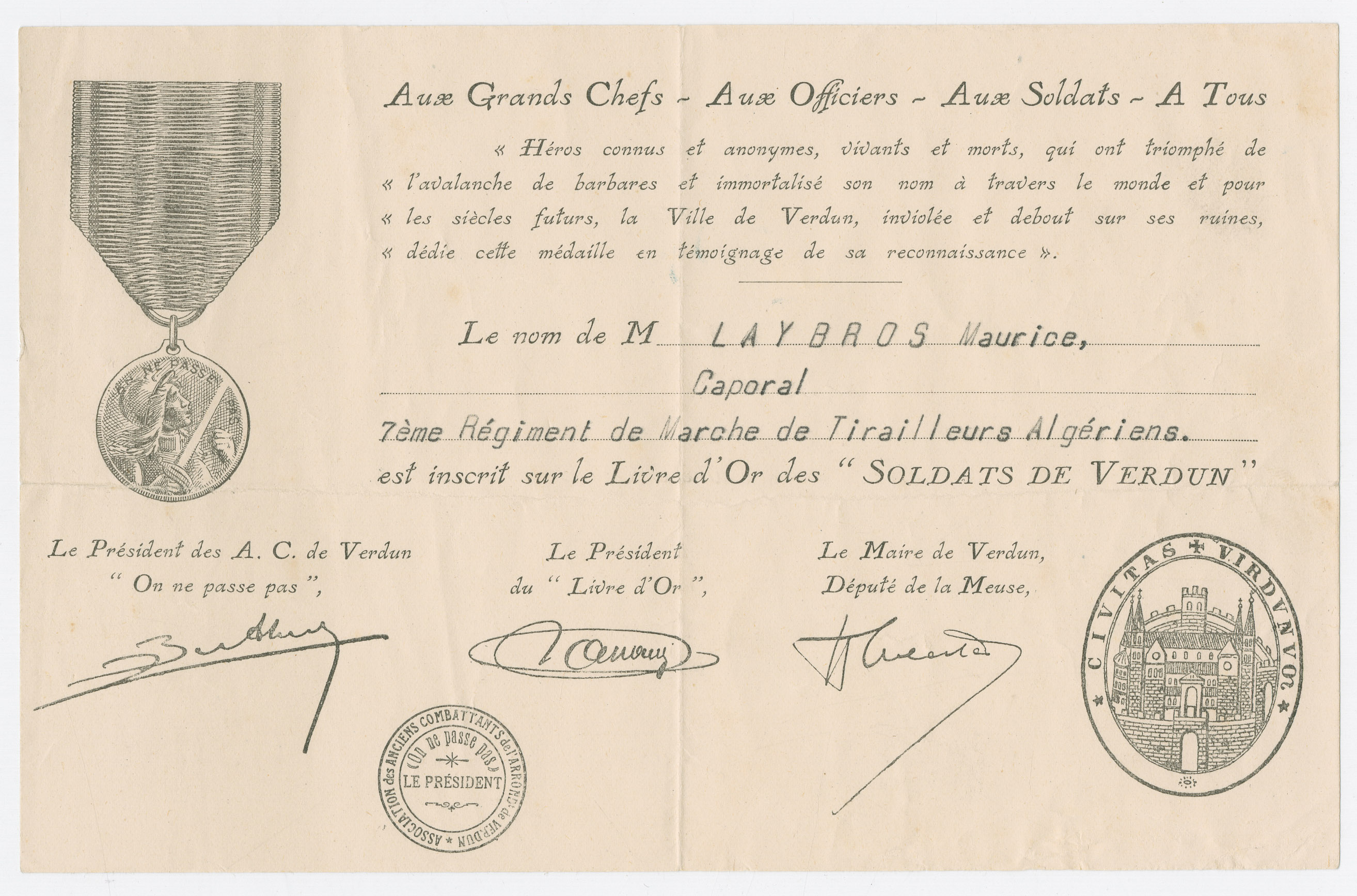
Certificates awarded to a corporal in the tirailleurs algériens for participation in the Battle of Verdun
- Fourragère in the colors of the Légion d'honneur (6 citations in Army Orders)
  - 2nd Regiment of Algerian Tirailleurs
  - 4th Regiment of Algerian Tirailleurs (4th Regiment of Tunisian Tirailleurs in 1921)
  - 7th Regiment of Algerian Tirailleurs
  - 4th Regiment of Zouaves and Tirailleurs (16th Regiment of Tunisian Tirailleurs in 1921)
- Fourragère in the colors of the Médaille militaire (4-5 citations in Army Orders)
  - 1st Regiment of Moroccan Tirailleurs
  - 1st Regiment of Algerian Tirailleurs
  - 1st Regiment of Zouaves and Tirailleurs (43rd Regiment of Algerian Tirailleurs in 1919)
  - 8th Regiment of Algerian Tirailleurs (8th Regiment of Tunisian Tirailleurs in 1921)
  - 13th Regiment of Algerian Tirailleurs
  - 1st Regiment of Senegalese Tirailleurs (from the 43rd battalion)
- Fourragère in the colors of the Croix de Guerre (2-3 citations in Army Orders)
  - 2nd Regiment of Moroccan Tirailleurs
  - 3rd Regiment of Algerian Tirailleurs
  - 5th Regiment of Algerian Tirailleurs
  - 6th Regiment of Algerian Tirailleurs
  - 9th Regiment of Algerian Tirailleurs
  - 10th Regiment of Algerian Tirailleurs
  - 11th Regiment of Algerian Tirailleurs

==== World War II ====
- Fourragère in the colors of the Médaille militaire (4-5 citations in Army Orders)
  - 3rd Regiment of Algerian Tirailleurs
  - 4th Regiment of Tunisian Tirailleurs
- Fourragère in the colors of the Croix de Guerre (2-3 citations in Army Orders)
  - 7th Regiment of Algerian Tirailleurs
  - 1st Regiment of Moroccan Tirailleurs
  - 2nd Regiment of Moroccan Tirailleurs
  - 4th Regiment of Moroccan Tirailleurs
  - 5th Regiment of Moroccan Tirailleurs
  - 6th Regiment of Moroccan Tirailleurs
  - 7th Regiment of Moroccan Tirailleurs
  - 8th Regiment of Moroccan Tirailleurs

== The Thiaroye massacre and compensation controversy ==
As colonial subjects, tirailleurs were not awarded the same pensions as their European counterparts after World War II. The discrimination led to a mutiny of Senegalese tirailleurs in Dakar at Camp Tiaroye in December 1944. The tirailleurs involved were former prisoners of war who had been repatriated to West Africa and placed in a holding camp awaiting discharge. They demonstrated in protest against the failure of the French authorities to pay salary arrears and discharge allowances. French soldiers guarding the camp opened fire, killing between thirty-five and seventy African soldiers. The provisional government of Charles de Gaulle, concerned at the impact of the Tiaroye incident on serving tirailleurs, acted quickly to ensure that claims for back pay and other money owed were settled.

When France's African colonies achieved independence between 1956 and the early 1960s, the military pensions of veterans who became citizens of the new nations were frozen. By contrast, their French counterparts, who might have served in the same units and fought in the same battles, received pensions that were adjusted for inflation in France itself. While the imbalanced situation was widely deplored, successive French governments did not act on the complaints of former French Army soldiers. One rationale for freezing pensions was that higher levels would have created an income gap between former soldiers and the rest of the population in African countries, where the cost of living was significantly lower than in France.

It was only in 2006 that President Jacques Chirac, reportedly moved by Rachid Bouchareb's movie Indigènes, gave instructions to increase the pensions of former colonial soldiers. However, more than forty years after the colonies had gained independence and sixty years after World War II had ended, many of the veterans had already died.

== Spanish Tiradores ==
The Spanish Army of Africa included an indigenous light infantry force under European officers, designated as the Tiradores de Ifni. In existence from 1934 to 1969, this corps was modelled on the North African tirailleurs of the French Army.

== Films ==
- Mathieu Vadepied, 2022. Father & Soldier (on the Senegalese tirailleurs during World War I)
- Rachid Bouchareb, 2006. Indigènes (on the Algerian tirailleurs during World War II)
- Ousmane Sembène, 1988. Camp de Thiaroye (on the Thiaroye insurrection)

== See also ==
- Army of Africa (France)
- Chasseurs d'Afrique
- Colonial troops
- Colonialism
- Français Tirailleur – Extinct French-based pidgin of West Africa
- French Colonial Forces
- French Foreign Legion
- Goumier
- Harkis
- Mehariste
- Senegalese Tirailleurs
- Spahi
- Tonkinese Rifles
