= Prince of Sulmona =

Pontifical noble title

Coat of arms of Camillo Borghese, 6th Prince of Sulmona

Prince of Sulmona (Italian: Principe di Sulmona) is a noble title of Italian origin. The title derives its name from Sulmona, a town in Abruzzo.

It was originally granted in 1526 with Grandeeship of Spain, during the reign of Charles V, Holy Roman Emperor as King of Naples, in recognition of the work done by Charles de Lannoy as Viceroy of Naples. The princely line of the House of Lannoy died out in 1604.

== History ==
The title was recreated in 1610 for Pope Paul V's nephew Marcantonio Borghese by King Philip III of Spain, in his capacity as king of Naples (just like in England, prince titles were alien to the Spanish peerage tradition). King Philip III sold the principality and the town of Sulmona to the Borghese Family, and the title still remains in this family. After the unification of Italy, the title was recognized by the new Kingdom of Italy.

== House of Lannoy, 1526–1604 ==
- Charles de Lannoy (1482-1527), Viceroy of Naples, 1st Prince of Sulmona
- Philippe Charles II de Lannoy (1514-1553), 2nd Prince of Sulmona
- Charles III de Lannoy (1537-1568), 3rd Prince of Sulmona
- Horace de Lannoy (d. 1597), 4th Prince of Sulmona
- Philippe de Lannoy (d. 1600), 5th Prince of Sulmona
- Philippe II de Lannoy (d. 1604), 6th Prince of Sulmona

== House of Borghese, 1610–present ==
Prince	Image	Birth	Marriages	Death
Marcantonio, 1st Prince of Sulmona; 1610–1658	Arms of Borghese	1598 son of Giovanni Battista Borghese and Virginia Lante	Camilla Orsini; 20 October 1619; 1 child	1658 aged 60
Giovanni, 2nd Prince of Sulmona; 1658–1717	Arms of Borghese	14 October 1639; Rome, Papal States son of Paolo, Prince Borghese and Olimpia Aldobrandini, Princess of Rossano	Eleonora Boncompagni; 22 October 1658; 1 child	8 May 1717; Rome, Papal States aged 77
Marcantonio, 3rd Prince of Sulmona; 1717–1729	Arms of Borghese	20 May 1660; Rome, Papal States son of Giovanni Battista, 2nd Prince of Sulmona and Eleonora Boncompagni	Lívia Spinola; 24 January 1691; 2 children	22 May 1729; Rome, Papal States aged 69
Camillo, 4th Prince of Sulmona; 1729–1763	Arms of Borghese	7 April 1693; Rome, Papal States son of Marcantonio, 3rd Prince of Sulmona and Lívia Spinola	Agnese Colonna; 4 October 1723; 10 children	16 September 1763; Rome, Papal States aged 70
Marcantonio, 5th Prince of Sulmona; 1763–1800	Marcantonio, 5th Prince of Sulmona	14 September 1730; Rome, Papal States son of Camillo, 4th Prince of Sulmona and Agnese Colonna	Anna Maria Salviati; 25 April 1768; 2 children	18 March 1800; Rome, Papal States aged 69
Camillo, 6th Prince of Sulmona; 1800–1832	Camillo, 6th Prince of Sulmona	8 August 1775; Rome, Papal States son of Marcantonio, 5th Prince of Sulmona and Anna Maria Salviati	Pauline Bonaparte, Duchess of Guastalla; 28 August 1803; No issue	9 May 1832; Rome, Papal States aged 56
Francesco, 7th Prince of Sulmona; 1832–1839		9 June 1776; Rome, Papal States son of Marcantonio Borghese, 5th Prince of Sulmona and Anna Maria Salviati	Adèle, Countess of La Rochefoucauld; 11 April 1809; 3 children	29 May 1839; Rome, Papal States aged 62
Marcantonio, 8th Prince of Sulmona; 1839–1886	Marcantonio, 8th Prince of Sulmona	23 February 1814; Paris, France son of Francesco, 7th Prince of Sulmona and Adèle, Countess of La Rochefoucauld	Lady Gwendoline Talbot; 11 April 1835; 1 child Marie Therèse de La Rochefoucauld; 2 December 1843; 9 children	5 October 1886; Frascati, Italy aged 72
Paolo, 9th Prince of Sulmona; 1886–1920	Arms of Borghese	13 September 1845; Rome, Papal States son of Marcantonio, 8th Prince of Sulmona and Marie Therèse de La Rochefoucauld	Ilona, Countess Appony of Nagy-Appony; 2 December 1866; 4 children	18 November 1920; Venice, Italy aged 75
Scipione, 10th Prince of Sulmona; 1920–1927	Scipione, 10th Prince of Sulmona	11 February 1871; Rome, Kingdom of Italy son of Paolo, 9th Prince of Sulmona and Ilona, Countess Appony of Nagy-Appony	Anna Maria de Ferrari; 23 May 1895; 2 children Teodora Martini; 8 August 1926; No issue	15 March 1927; Florence, Italy aged 56
Livio, 11th Prince of Sulmona; 1927–1939	Arms of Borghese	13 August 1874; Frascati, Kingdom of Italy son of Paolo, 9th Prince of Sulmona and Ilona, Countess Appony of Nagy-Appony	Valeria Keun; 31 August 1901; 2 children	29 November 1939; Athens, Greece aged 65
Flavio, 12th Prince of Sulmona; 1939–1980	Arms of Borghese	2 May 1902; Smirna, Ottoman Empire son of Livio, 11th Prince of Sulmona and Valeria Keun	Angela Paternò, 7th Princess of Sperlinga dei Manganelli; 10 January 1927; 3 children	28 March 1980; Catania, Italy aged 78
Camillo, 13th Prince of Sulmona; 1980–2011	Arms of Borghese	30 October 1927; Rome, Kingdom of Italy son of Flavio, 12th Prince of Sulmona and Angela Paternò, 7th Princess of Sperlinga dei Manganelli	Rossana Nucci; 26 June 1958; 2 children	22 December 2011; Rome, Italy aged 84
Scipione, 14th Prince of Sulmona; 2011–	Scipione, 14th Prince of Sulmona	19 November 1970; Rome, Italy son of Camillo, 13th Prince of Sulmona and Rosanna Nucci		
