= Paolo Borghese (1904–1985) =

Italian nobleman

Don Paolo Borghese, Duke of Bomarzo, Prince of Sant Angelo of San Paolo (20 October 1904 – 24 April 1985) was an Italian nobleman of the Borghese family. He was born in Cafaggiolo. His father and mother were Marco Borghese, Duca di Bomarzo, and Isabel Fanny Louise Porges.

His first wife was Anne dei Conti Scheibler, whom he married on 21 April 1927 at Castellazo. They had two children, Flavia Maria Pia Isabella Ernesta Ermina (born 1930) and Camila Maria Antonia Pia Isabella Ernesta Erminia (born 1932).

After Anne's death, Paolo married his second wife, Marcella Fazi, on 12 April 1938 at Rome. They had two children, the twin boys Francesco Marco Luigi Costanzo and Livio Marco Luigi Fabrizio (born 1938).

== The Borghese family ==
The Borghese family's coat of arms

Paolo Borghese's ancestors included Camillo Borghese (husband of Napoleon's sister, Pauline Bonaparte), as well as Pope Paul V and Cardinal Scipione Borghese. The latter two had an enormous influence on Italian art and beautifying Rome in the 1600s, and they helped finish St. Peter's Basilica. To honor Pope Paul V's accomplishments, the Borghese family name (spelled in Latin as Bvrghesivs) and coat of arms (an eagle and a dragon) can be found on the façade of the famous basilica.

The Borghese family received their titles (Prince and Princess) from Pope Paul V in the early 1600s. During that time, the Pope often had powers equal to a king, and like a king, he had the power to bestow titles, called Papal titles. These titles were often tied to territories of land. Paolo Borghese's branch of the family received five different titles, which included Prince of San Paolo, Prince of Sant'Angelo and Duke of Bomarzo.

While Pope Paul V was in power, he purchased entire towns and approximately 1/3 of the land south of Rome. As a family, the Borghese became the largest landowners of the "Roman Campagna," the central region in Italy, which is an area of approximately 1,300 square miles.

The Borghese name is displayed throughout Italy, including Florence at the Palazzo Borghese, Siena, and Rome. Rome's largest park, Villa Borghese gardens, was owned by the family until 1902, and one of Rome's largest museums, Galleria Borghese, holds the family's art collection. One of Rome's most famous streets is also named after the family, Via Borghese, and the family's coat of arms can be found in many piazzas throughout Italy.

The Borghese family has a private chapel in one of Rome's most famous basilicas, Santa Maria Maggiore. Beneath this basilica is a private crypt where many famous Borghese family members are laid to rest, including Pope Paul V, Pauline Bonaparte and her husband Camillo Borghese, as well as Paolo Borghese himself and his wife Marcella.
