= Magic-City =

Former amusement park in Paris

Coordinates: 48°51′42″N 02°18′15″E

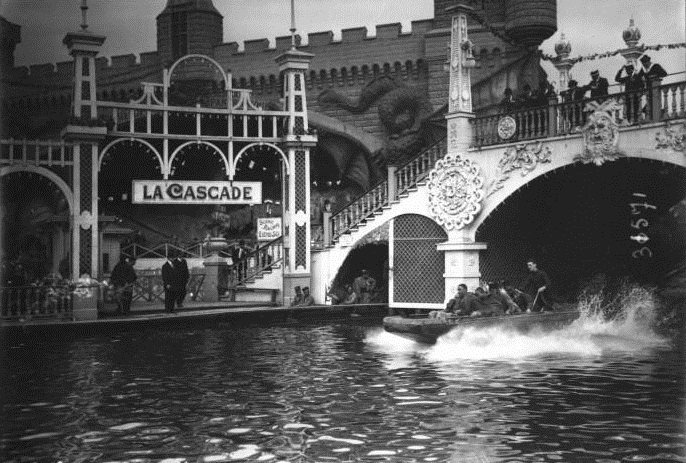
La Cascade, a "Shoot the Chute" ride at Magic-City

Magic-City was an amusement park near Pont de l'Alma, two blocks east of the Eiffel Tower, in Paris from 1900 to 1934.

A large dance hall at 188 rue de l'Université in Paris was located in Magic-City. The venue was known for its "drag balls".

The emblematic event of homosexual life in Paris in the inter-war years was a series of masked balls held annually during Carnival on Mardi Gras (Shrove Tuesday) and Mi-Carême (Mid-Lent) at Magic-City Dancing, an immense dance-hall on the Rue de l'Universite, near the Eiffel Tower. ... Between 1922 and 1939, thousands of men, most costumed and many in extravagant female drag, attended the balls at Magic-City every year. 'On this night,' wrote a journalist in 1931, 'all of Sodom's grandsons scattered throughout the world...seem to have rebuilt their accursed city for an evening. The presence of so many of their kind makes them forget their abnormality.'

— David Higgs, Queer Sites: Gay Urban Histories Since 1600 (1999)

Brassaï, who photographed the events, wrote of an "immense, warm, impulsive fraternity" at Magic-City, saying "The cream of Parisian inverts was to meet there, without distinction as to class, race or age. And every type came, faggots, cruisers, chickens, old queens, famous antique dealers and young butcher boys, hairdressers and elevator boys, well-known dress designers and drag queens..."

Magic-City was closed by the authorities on February 6, 1934, and in 1942 the building was bought by the government and turned over to Paris-Télévision, which began broadcasting there in 1943.

== Gallery ==
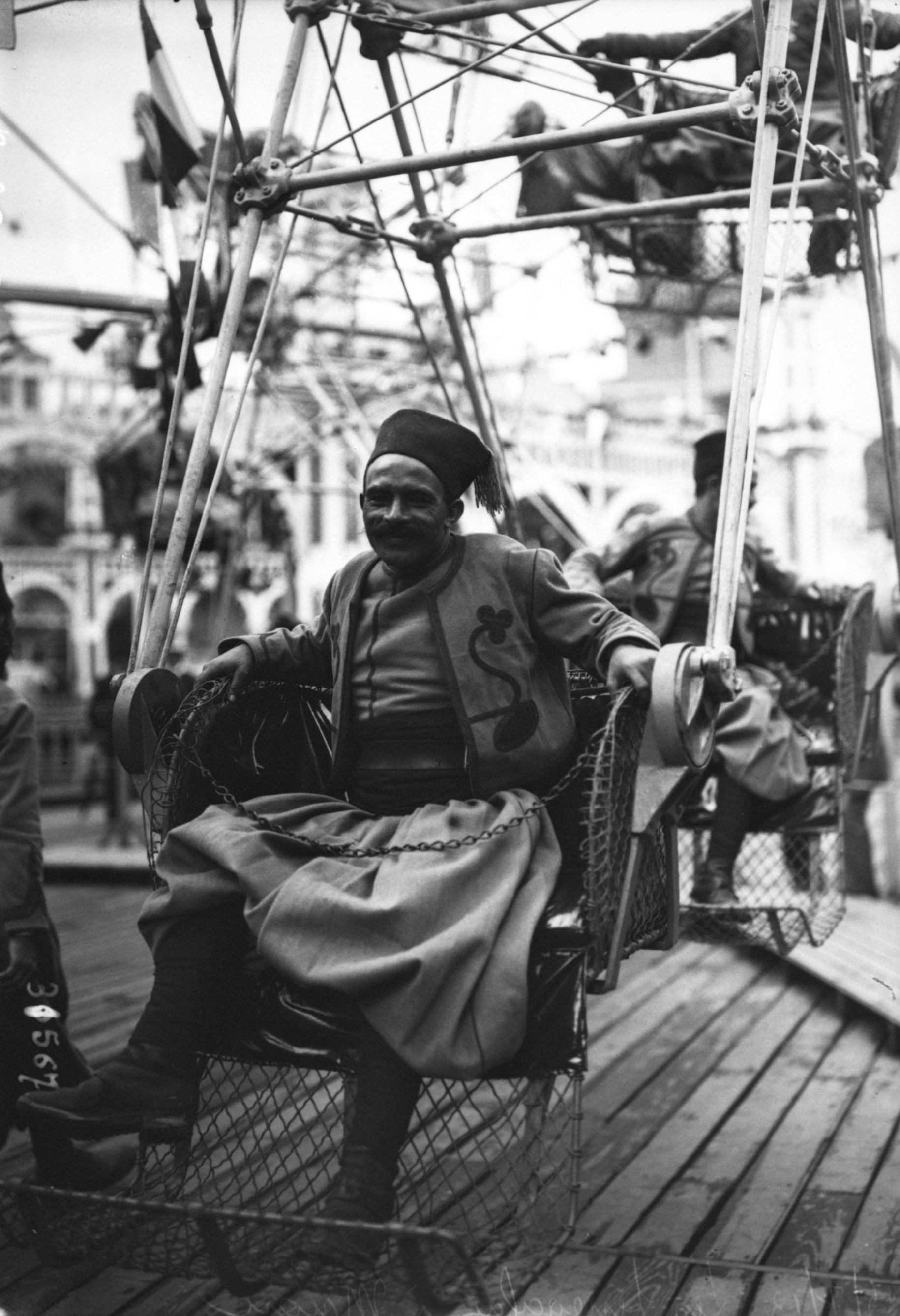
Algerian tirailleur (soldier) at Magic City.

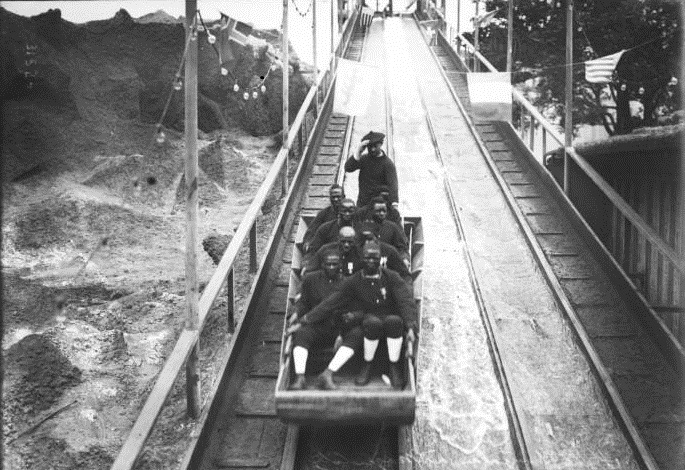
La Cascade, 1913.

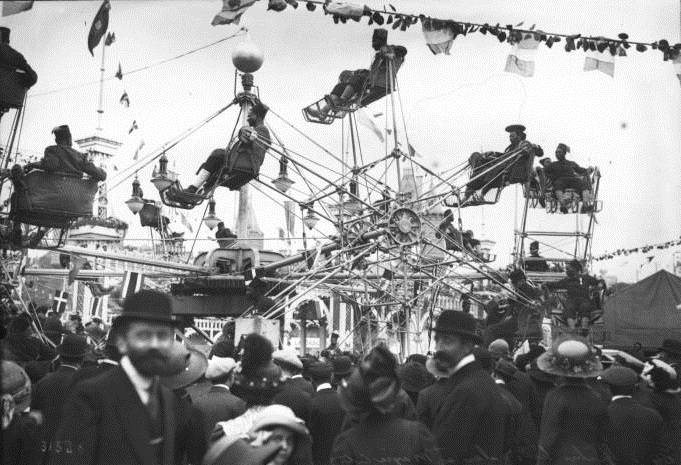
Ferris wheel, 1913.
