= Donna Marcella Borghese =

Italian socialite

Princess Marcella Borghese (15 February 1911 - 19 January 2002) was an Italian socialite, who was the wife of Paolo Borghese. She became a noted businesswoman, manufacturing her own line of cosmetics.

== Early life ==
Marcella Fazi was born in Umbria, Italy in 1911. In 1937, she became the second wife of the widowed nobleman Paolo Borghese, Duke of Bomarzo and Prince of Sant’ Angelo e San Polo, and acquired the title of Princess.

The fashion-conscious princess had toiletries, including makeup, made specifically for her using the natural ingredients found around the Villa Borghese in Rome, where the family lived. She wanted to create a line of lipsticks in a wider variety of shades than what was available at the time, and once Pope Pius XII gave the cosmetics his blessing, pushed forward with the idea.

== Cosmetics and skincare brands ==
In 1956, Borghese met cosmetics magnate, Charles Revson, the founder of Revlon. The two struck up a lifelong friendship, as he helped her to create her cosmetics line, which Revlon then licensed under the Princess Marcella Borghese brand name.

One of Princess Marcella Borghese's first collections included brightly colored lipsticks and nail colors to match the vivid colors of her fashion designer friend, Emilio Pucci's knitwear. Her Montecatini Cosmetic line, named after her favorite spa (and an ancient town in Tuscany), used the purported healing properties of the Terme di Montecatini mud and the mineral waters.

The Princess was one of the first people to create a skincare line which was based on the natural therapies of a spa. In 1992, Revlon sold the Borghese brand to Halston Borghese International Limited, a new company set up in New York by four Saudi investors (all brothers) to buy and hold Revlon’s Halston and Princess Marcella Borghese divisions. Borghese remained involved in the line named after her until her death.

Today, the company is privately held and known as simply Borghese. It is based in New York City. It has been run by CEO and owner Georgette Mosbacher since 2000. The brand is sold primarily through department stores and online. In 2009, Georgette Mosbacher stated that Borghese was a $100 million USD company with a third of their business being in Asia.

== Extended family and death ==
In 1937, the Princess gave birth to twin boys, Francesco and Livio. She also had two daughters, Rosanna and Anita Maurizi, from a previous marriage. She had two grandchildren from her first marriage, Sylvia and Valentina. From her second marriage, she had five grandchildren: Scipione, Ilaria and Lorenzo from Francesco's side and from Livio's side, Luca and Matteo.

Princess Marcella Borghese died on 19 January 2002 in her home in Montreux, Switzerland. She was 90 years old, and was buried in the family crypt at the Basilica of Santa Maria Maggiore in Rome.
