= Marcantonio Borghese, 5th Prince of Sulmona =

Head of the Borghese family of Rome

Marcantonio III Borghese, 5th Prince of Sulmona (16 September 1730 – 26 March 1800) was the head of the Borghese family of Rome. Pro-Napoleon in sympathies, he was the father of Camillo Filippo Ludovico Borghese, 6th Prince of Sulmona and Francesco, 7th Prince of Sulmona (1832–1839).

Prince Marcantonio began recasting his family's Rome villa into a structured museum. From about 1775, under the guidance of architect Antonio Asprucci, old tapestry and leather hangings were removed, new ceiling decorations commissioned and the Casina renovated. The Borghese collection sculptures were reorganized around the Villa in a thematic new ordering that celebrated the Borghese position in Rome. For example, in 1785, he had Bernini's Apollo and Daphne moved to the centre of its room.

Marcantonio transformed the villa's gardens from a formal garden architecture into an English landscape garden.
