= Camillo Borghese, 6th Prince of Sulmona =

Camillo Borghese
- Prince of the French Empire
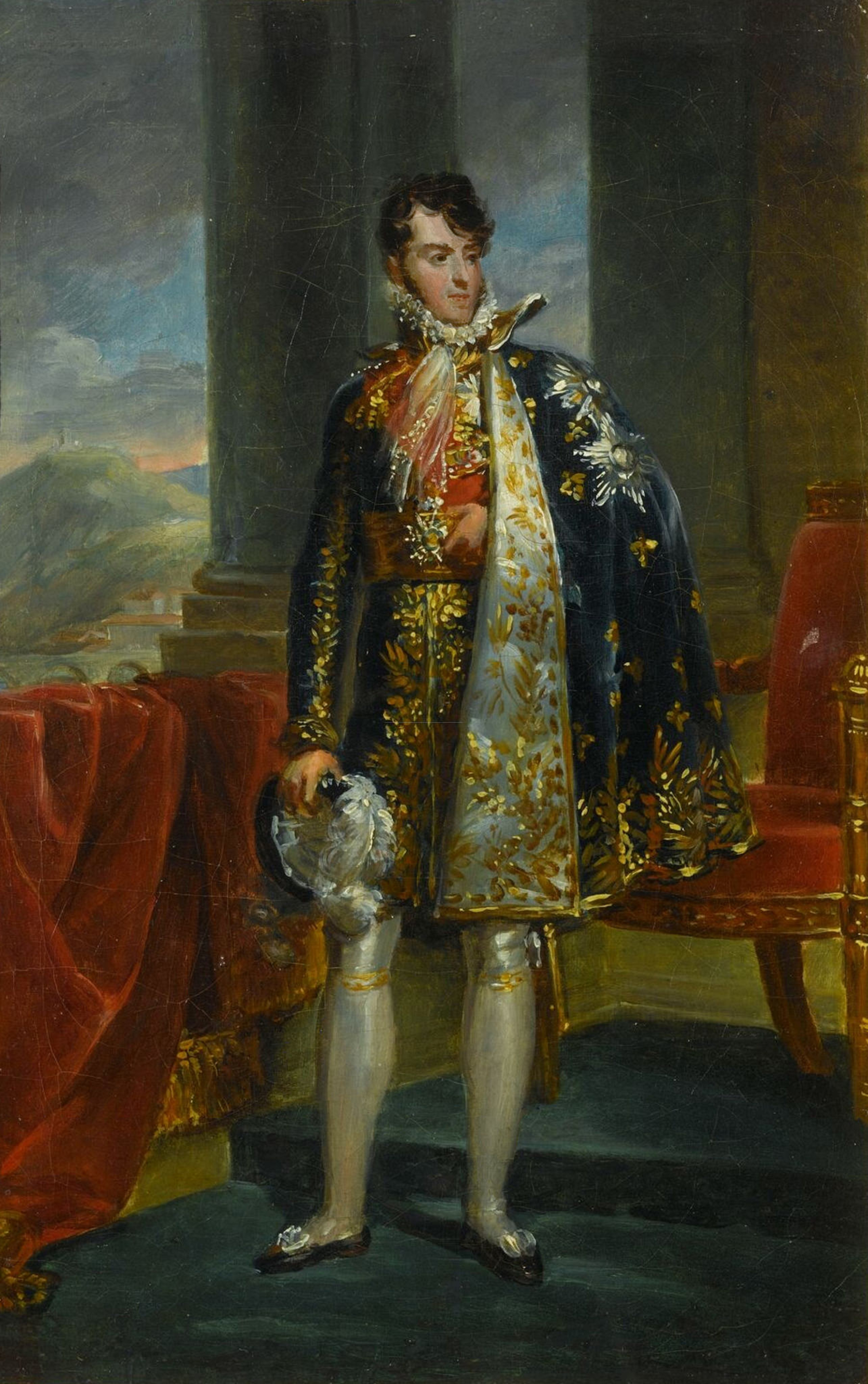
- Portrait by François Gérard

6th Prince of Sulmona
- Reign: 1800–1832
- Predecessor: Marcantonio Borghese
- Successor: Francesco Borghese

Duke of Guastalla
- Reign: March–August 1806
- Predecessor: Ferdinand, Duke of Parma
- Successor: Territory annexed by the Duchy of Parma
- Co-ruler: Pauline Bonaparte

Governor of French Piedmont
- Reign: 1800–1814
- Predecessor: Office established
- Successor: Office dissolved

Personal Details
- Born: 19 July 1775; Rome, Papal States
- Died: 9 May 1832 (aged 56); Florence, Grand Duchy of Tuscany
- Spouse: Pauline Bonaparte (m. 1803)
Names
- Camillo Filippo Ludovico Borghese
- House: Borghese
- Military career
- Allegiance: (France) French Empire
- Branch: (France) French Imperial Army
- Service years: 1803–1814
- Rank: Divisional General
- Commands: Tirailleurs du Po
- Awards: Knight of the Order of the Golden Fleece; Grand Eagle of the Legion of Honour

Don Camillo Filippo Ludovico Borghese, Prince of Sulmona and of Rossano, Duke and Prince of Guastalla (19 July 1775 – 9 May 1832), was a member of the Borghese family and was best known for being a brother-in-law of Napoleon. In 1803, Borghese married Napoleon's younger sister, Pauline Bonaparte, which led to Napoleon granting him multiple titles. After Napoleon was defeated, Borghese fled from France and left his wife behind. Consequently, he was stripped of the titles granted to him by Napoleon, although he retained his family's ancestral titles. While in Florence, he died at the age of 56, and the cause of death is unknown.

== Life and career ==
Camillo Borghese was born in Rome as the son of the pro-Napoleon Marcantonio Borghese, 5th Prince of Sulmona. His younger brother was Francesco Borghese (1776–1839), who eventually became the 7th Prince of Sulmona.

Borghese entered France's service in 1796. He became the second husband of Napoleon's sister Pauline Bonaparte in 1803 after the death of her first husband, General Charles Leclerc.

Following his marriage, Borghese was made regimental chief of the Tirailleurs du Po, which was recruited from the region that he governed. He remained in this position until 24 January 1804, when he retired from military life. Shortly afterwards, he was made a Prince of the French Empire and subsequently promoted to squadron chief in the Imperial Guard in 1805 (as an honorary rank). On 10 February 1805, he was anointed with the Grand Eagle of the Legion of Honour. On 27 December 1805, he was promoted to Colonel. He became the Duke of Guastalla in 1806, but this area was annexed by the Duchy of Parma shortly thereafter.

In 1807, Borghese was forced to sell his art collection for around 3 million francs, which was held in the Abbey of Lucedio near Turin, which itself had an estimated worth of around 4 million francs. His collection is now held at the Louvre in Paris.

On 14 May 1807, Borghese was promoted to Brigade General, and on 23 January 1808, he became Divisional General. In 1808, he was made overall military commander in Piedmont, and in 1809, this command was split into the 27th and 28th Military Divisions (Districts), which were integrated into the French Imperial Army. These divisions encompassed the regions of Piedmont that were previously part of the Austrian Italian provinces. Subsequently, he was made grand dignitary and governor general of Piedmont, overseeing the regions of Piedmont, Genoa and Parma.

After ten years there with a long-term mistress, Borghese was reluctantly convinced by the pope into receiving Pauline back, only 3 months before she died of cancer. He then continued in secret and futile Bonapartist plots until his own death, which occurred in Florence on 10 April 1832.

During his time as Prince of Sulmona and of Rossano, Borghese was considered to be the richest Roman prince of his time. His family was also heavily involved in the murder of General Duphot in 1798.

== Gallery ==
Coat of arms of Camillo Borghese

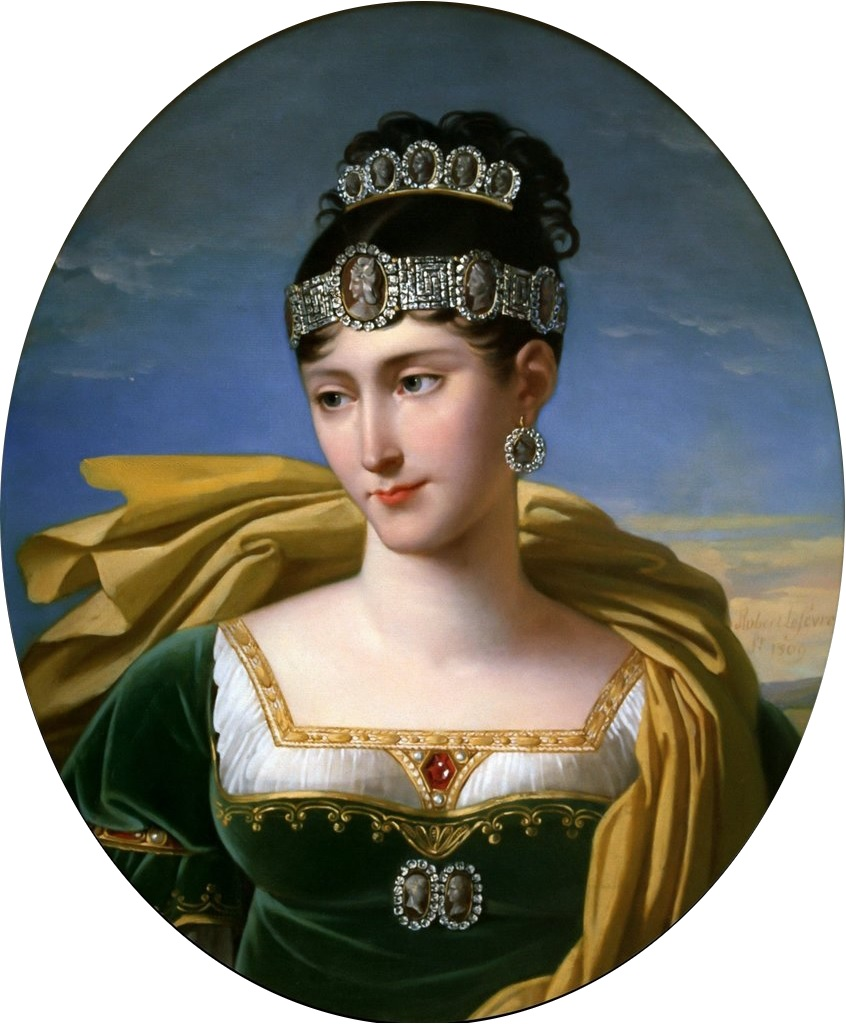
Portrait of Pauline Bonaparte
