= Camporese =

Camporese is an Italian surname. Notable people with the surname include:

- Michele Camporese, (born 1992), Italian footballer
- Omar Camporese, Italian tennis player
- Michael Camporese, Retailer & Salesman
- Pietro Camporese the Elder, Italian architect
  - Pietro Camporese the Younger, Italian architect
