= Pietro Camporese =

Pietro Camporese may refer to one of two Italian architects:

- Pietro Camporese the Elder
- Pietro Camporese the Younger, grandson of the above
