= Arch of Marcus Aurelius =

The Arch of Marcus Aurelius may refer to:

- Arch of Marcus Aurelius (Rome), in Italy
- Arch of Marcus Aurelius (Tripoli), in Libya (ancient city of Oea)
