= Arch of Marcus Aurelius (Rome) =

Ancient Roman triumphal arch, now lost

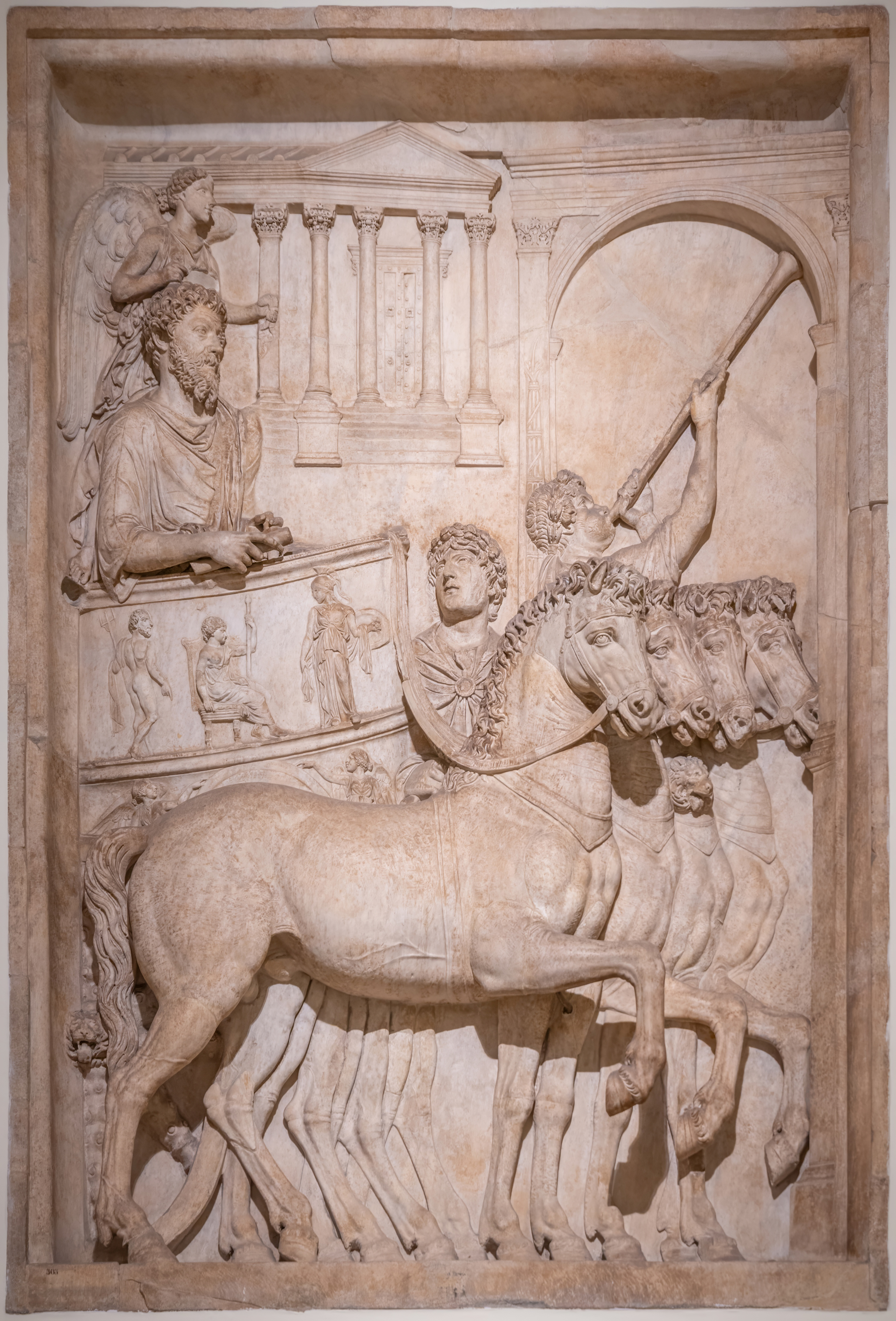
- One of the reliefs that are believed to have been from the Arch of Marcus Aurelius and today preserved in the Capitoline Museums in Rome.

- Shown within Augustan Rome
- Click on the map for a fullscreen view
- 41°54′5.4″N 12°28′49.7″E
- Type: Triumphal arch
- Location: Regio IX Circus Flaminius

History
- Built: late 2nd century
- Built by: Commodus

The Arch of Marcus Aurelius (Latin: Arcus Marci Aurelii) was a Roman triumphal arch in Rome, probably in the region of the Campus Martius, near the modern Piazza Colonna and the Column of Marcus Aurelius.

== History ==
The Arch of Marcus Aurelius, dedicated to the emperor Marcus Aurelius by the Roman Senate is known through literary sources and an inscription. It was decreed by the Senate at the end of the first phase of the Marcomannic War which ended with a triumph celebrated by the emperor and his son Commodus over the Marcomanni and Sarmatians in December 176.

== Topography ==
The existence of an arch dedicated to Marcus Aurelius is based on a cycle of twelve reliefs that would have been used to decorate it, eight of which were reused in the Arch of Constantine, three that are preserved in the Palazzo dei Conservatori (Capitoline Museums) and a final one that was destroyed and of which only a fragment remains, currently preserved in Copenhagen. The reliefs, carved in two tranches in 173 and 176, were previously attributed to an "arcus aureus" or the "arcus Panis Aurei in Capitolio". This arch was quoted in medieval sources and which would have been located at the foot of the Capitoline Hill, at the intersection of the Via Lata and the Clivus Argentarius not far from the church of Santi Luca e Martina, the location where the three reliefs now in the Capitoline Museums had been reused.

Another possible location where the arch may have originally been is near the Column of Marcus Aurelius, serving as a monumental entrance to the portico that surrounded the column and the Temple of Marcus Aurelius in the Campus Martius.

== Embossed panels ==
The reliefs that would have been part of the Arch of Marcus Aurelius depict the story of the emperor's military victories during the Marcomannic Wars. The emperor appears in all of them, and always in the company of a character who has been identified as his son-in-law and, for a time, his successor in pectore, Tiberius Claudius Pompeianus. The existence of both figures across all of the reliefs has been used to support the premise that there was a common origin for the reliefs.

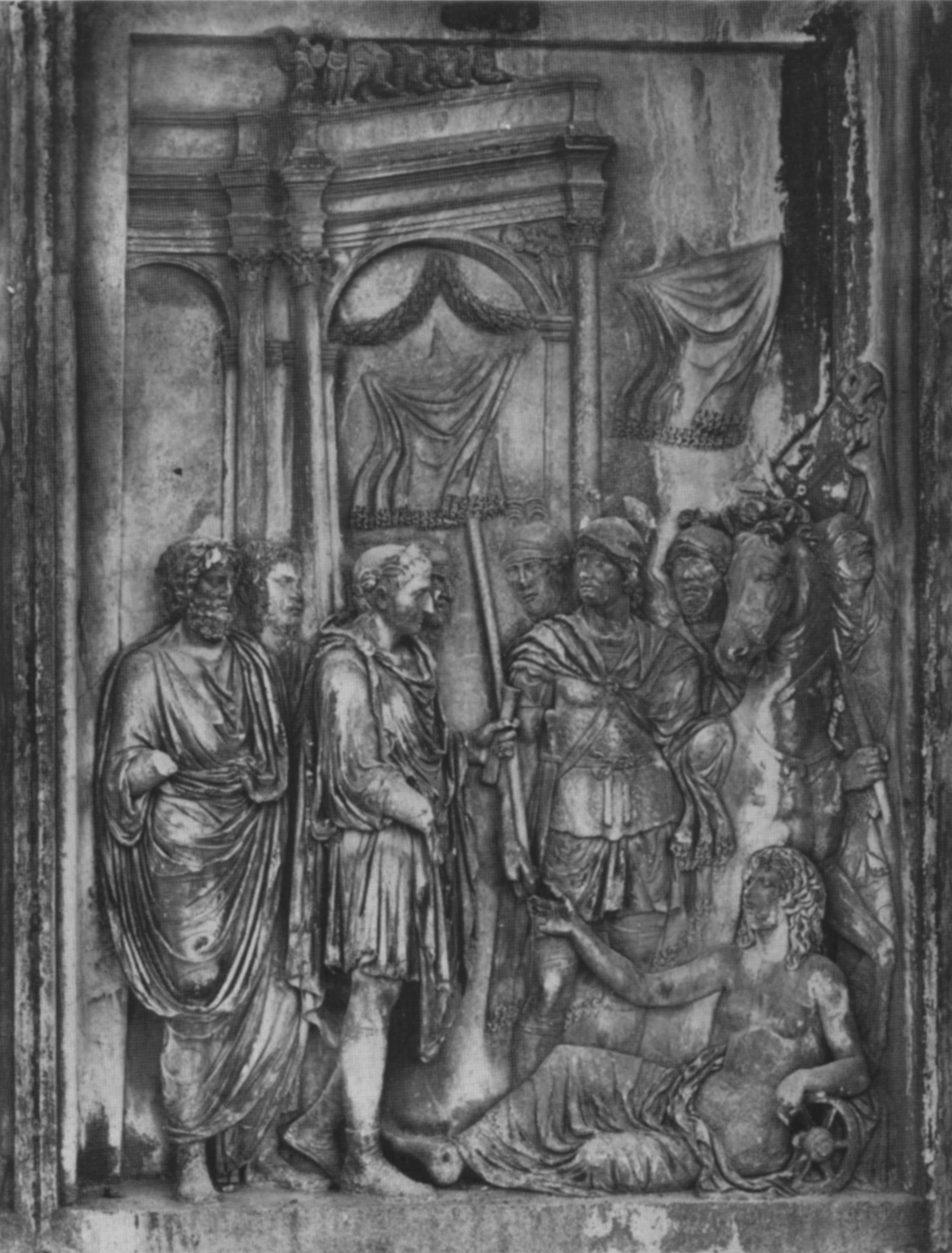
Departure
(Arch of Constantine)

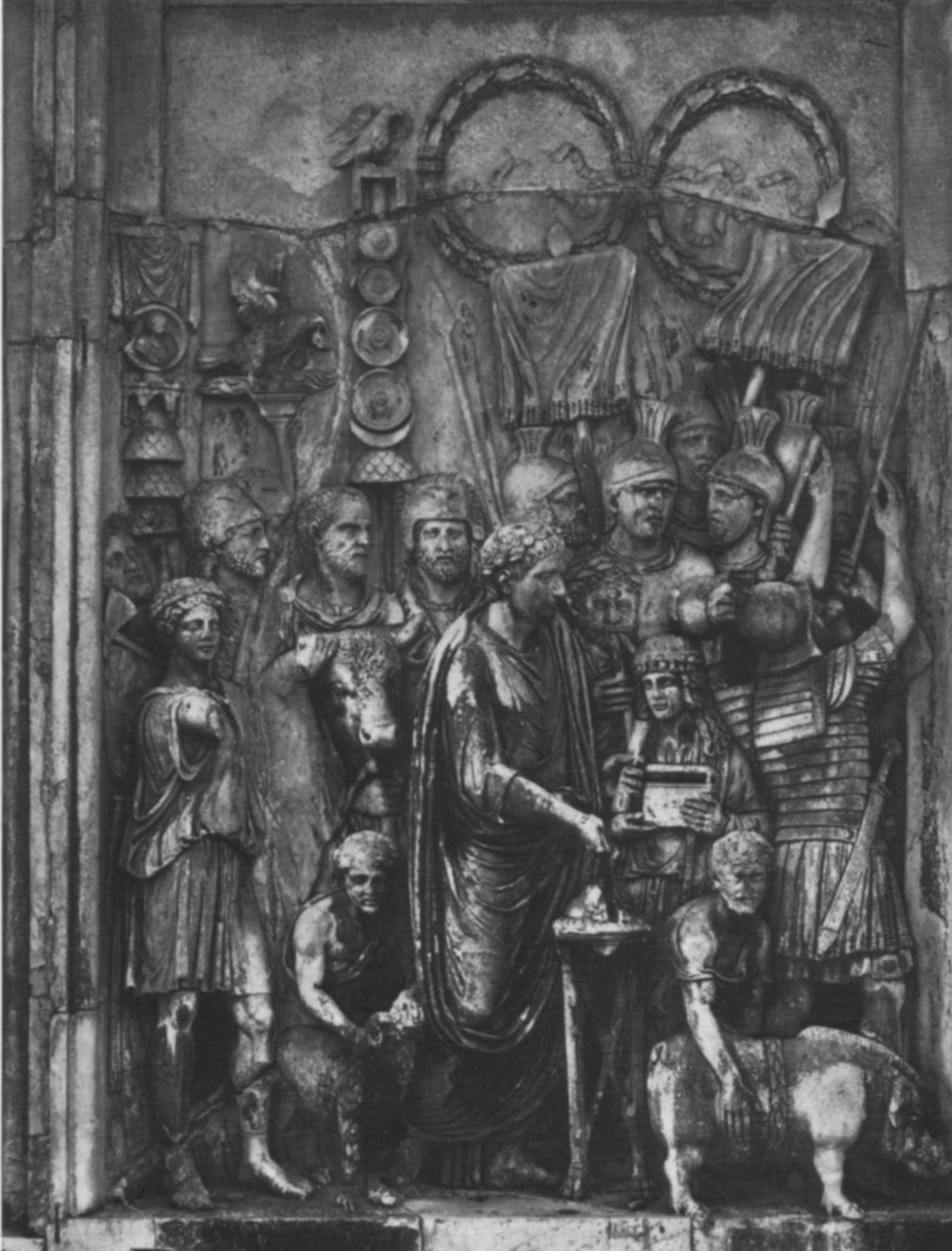
Lustratio
(Arch of Constantine)

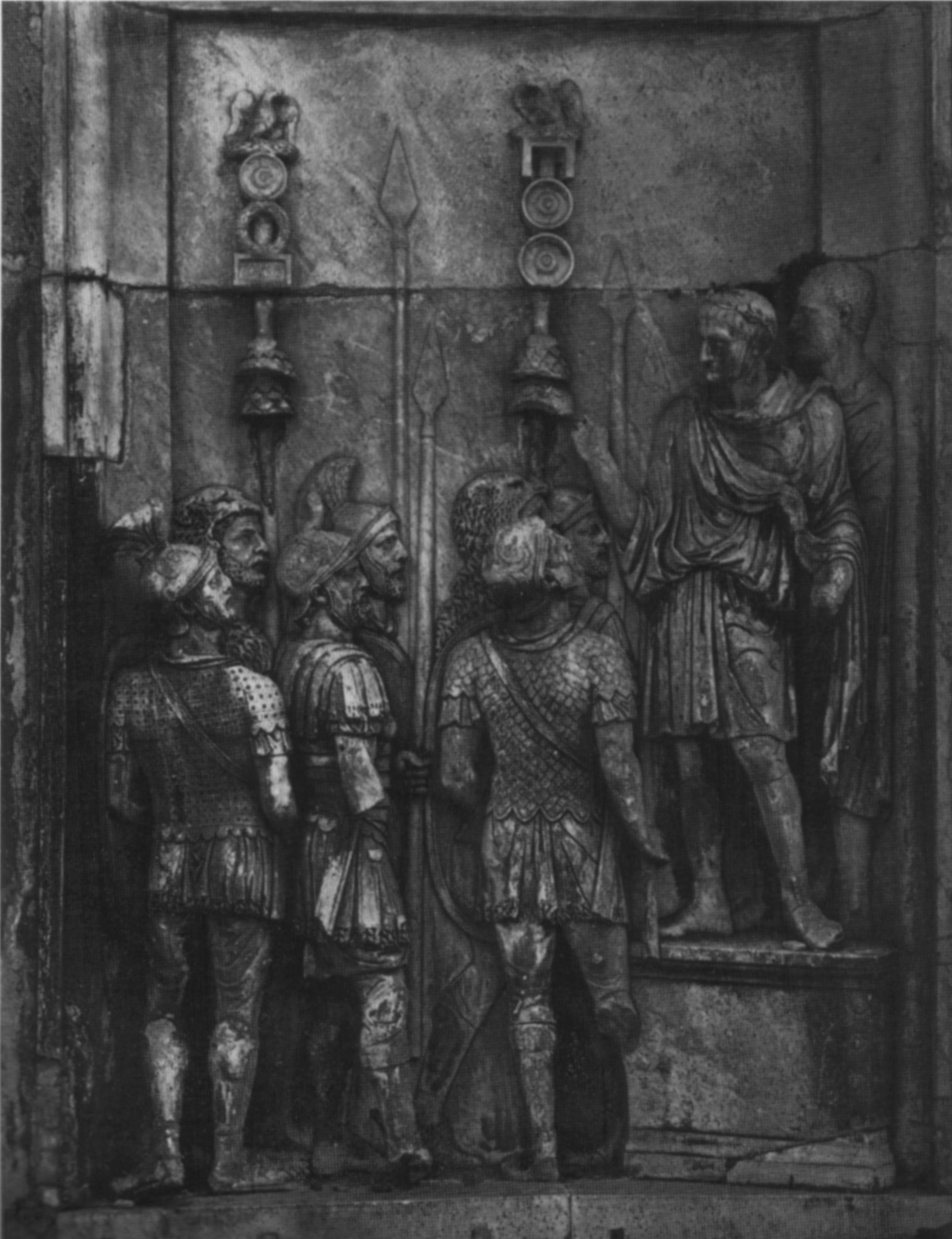
Allocution
(Arch of Constantine)

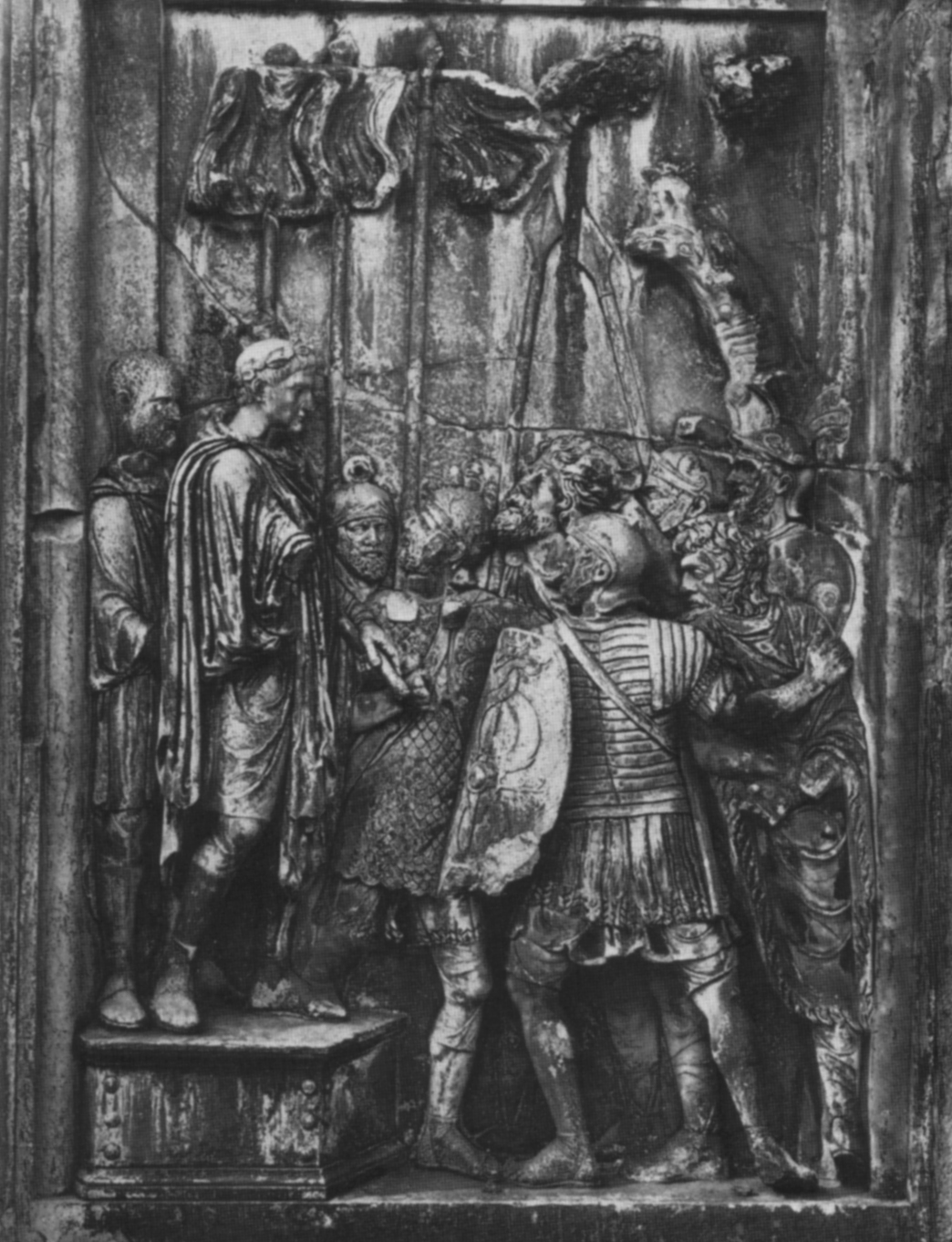
Captives
(Arch of Constantine)

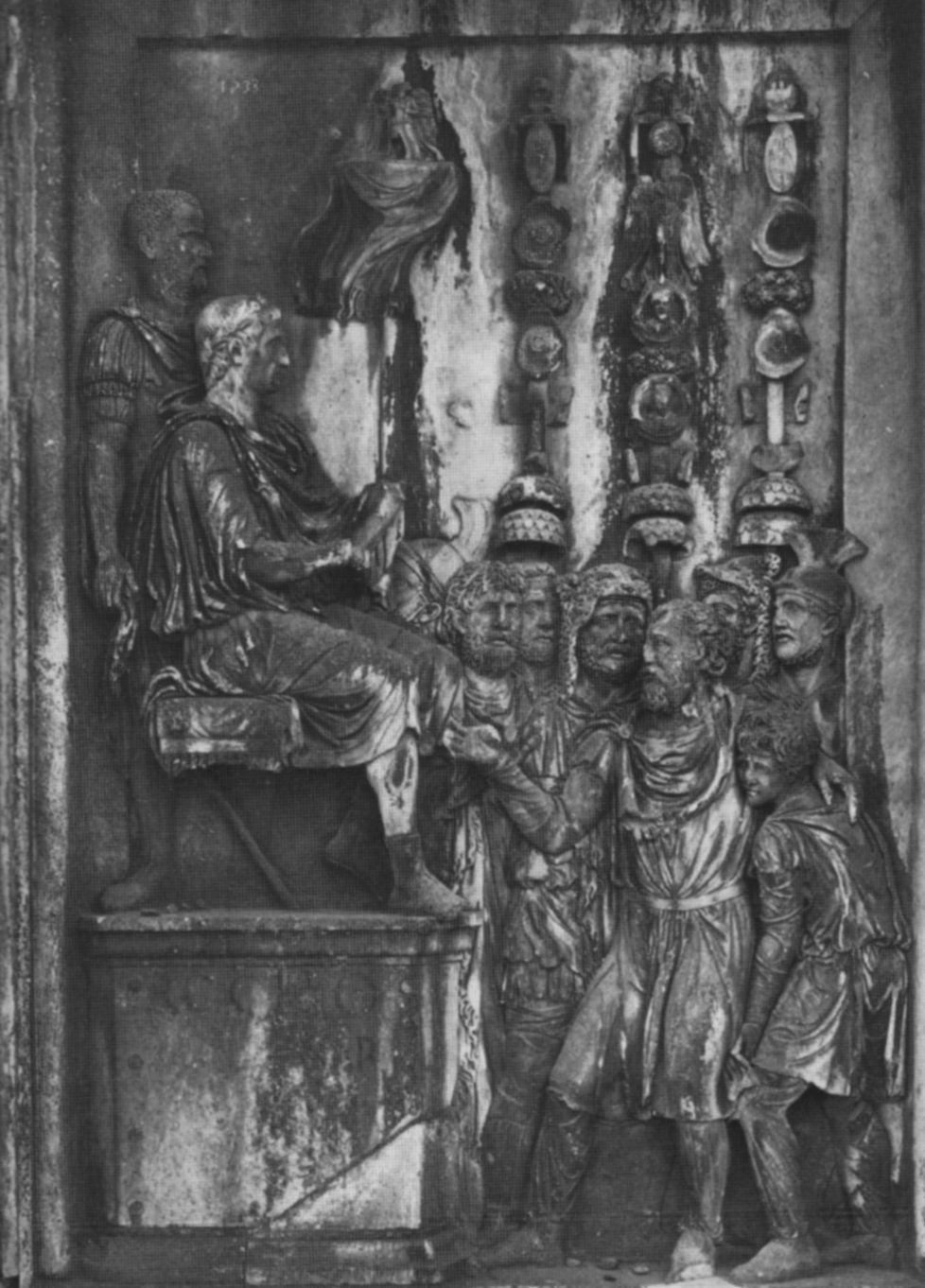
Clemency
(Arch of Constantine)

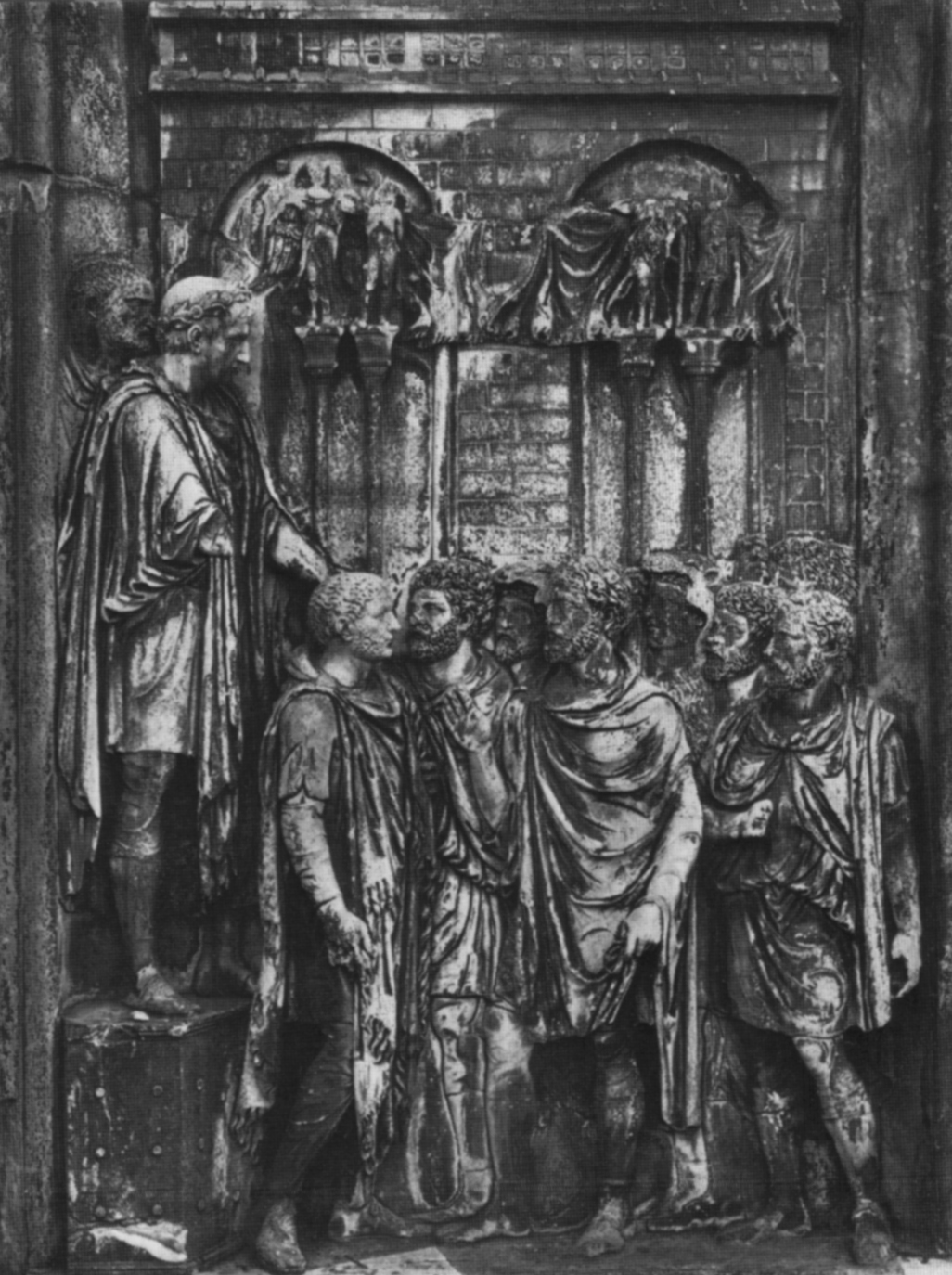
Concession of the King
(Arch of Constantine)

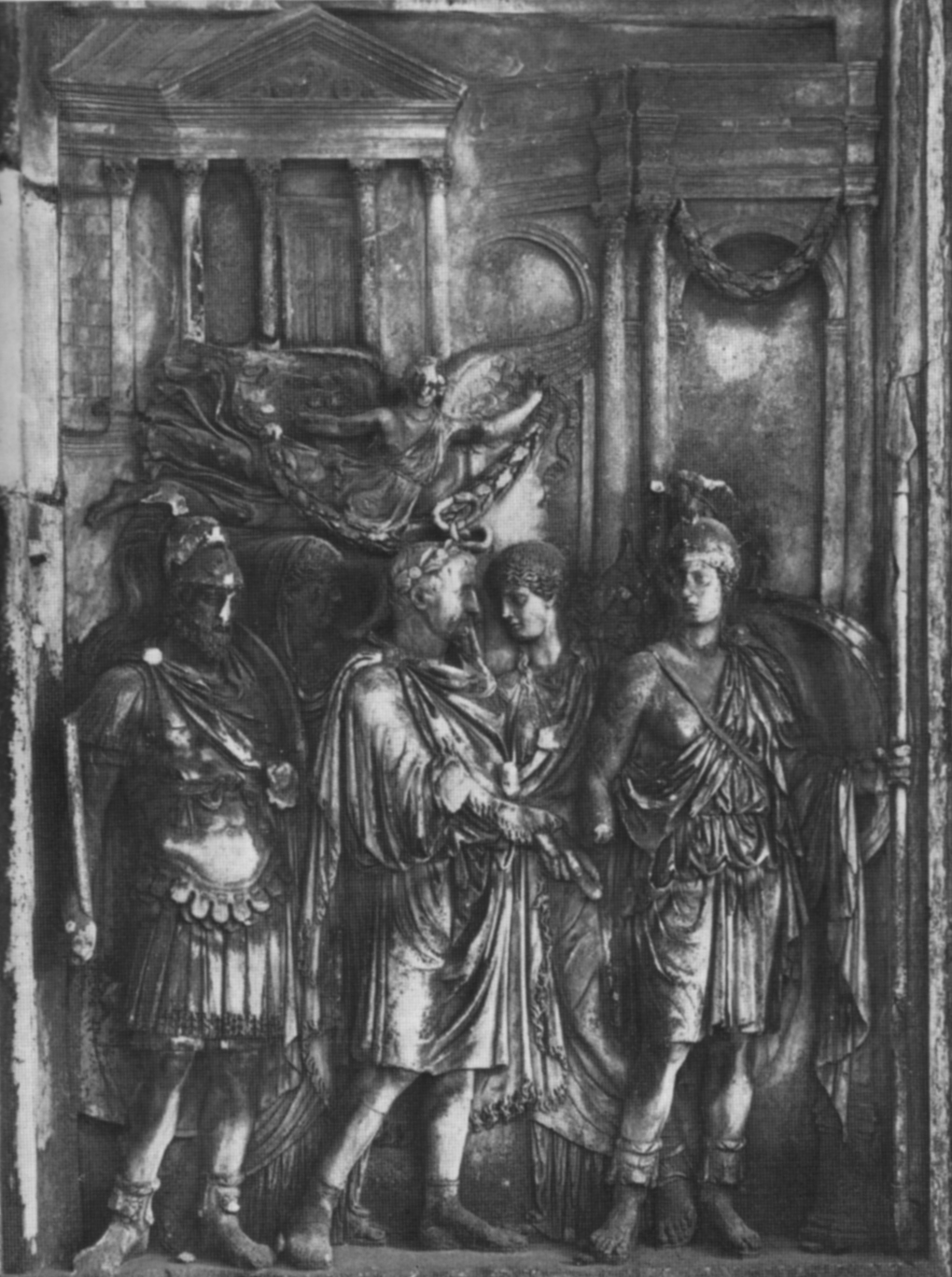
Adventus
(Arch of Constantine)

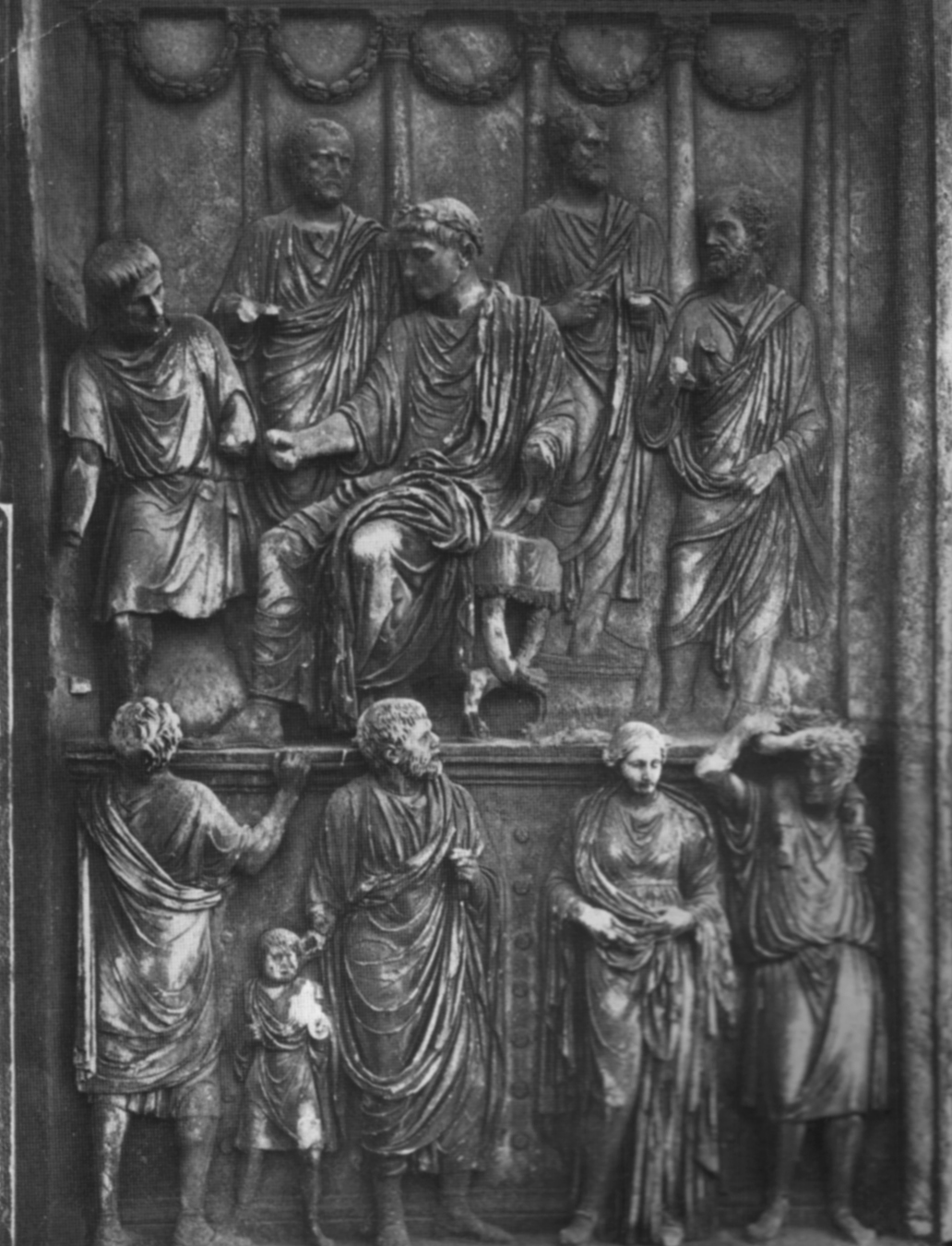
Liberalitas
(Arch of Constantine)

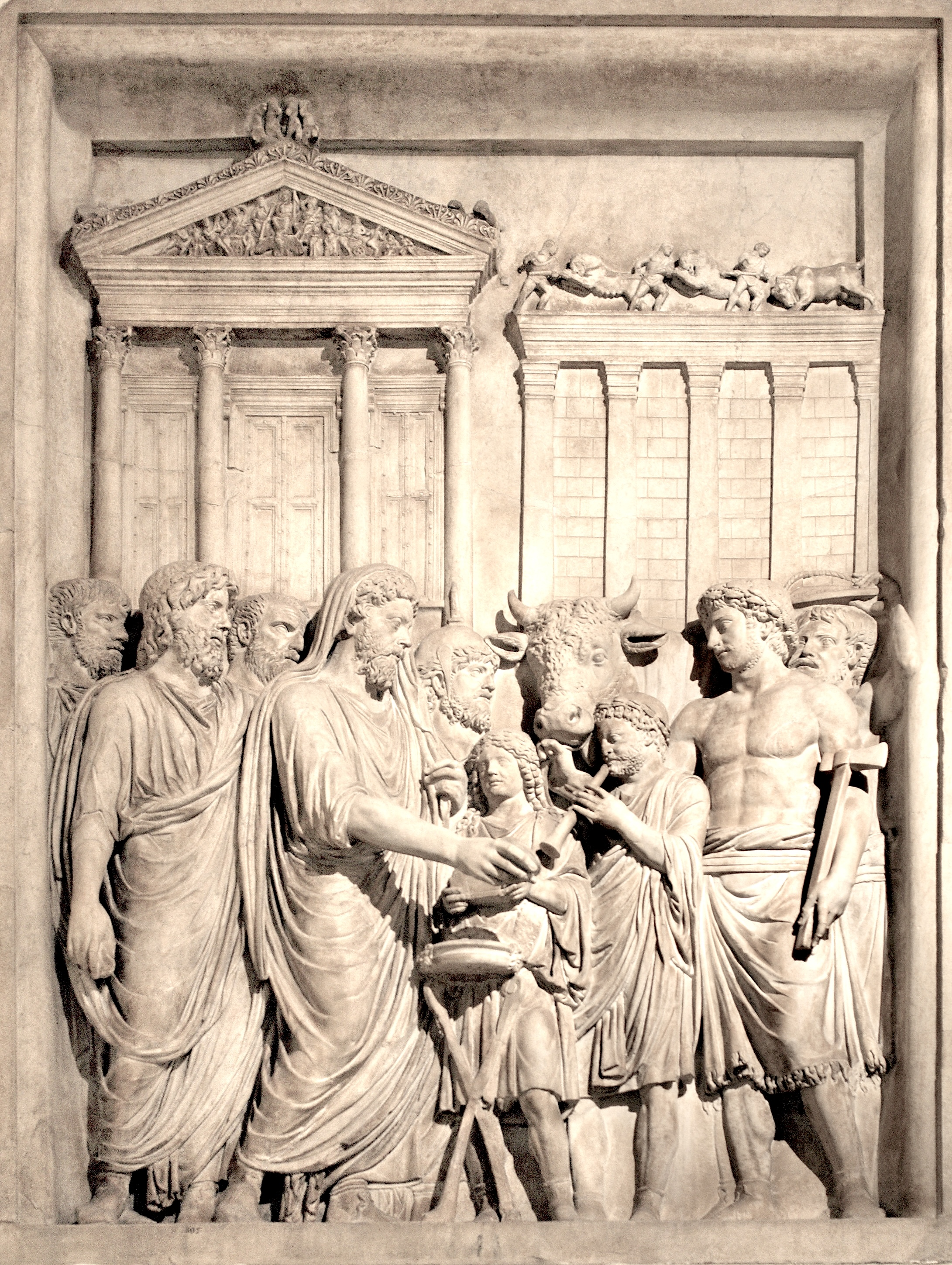
Suovetaurilia
(Capitoline Museums)

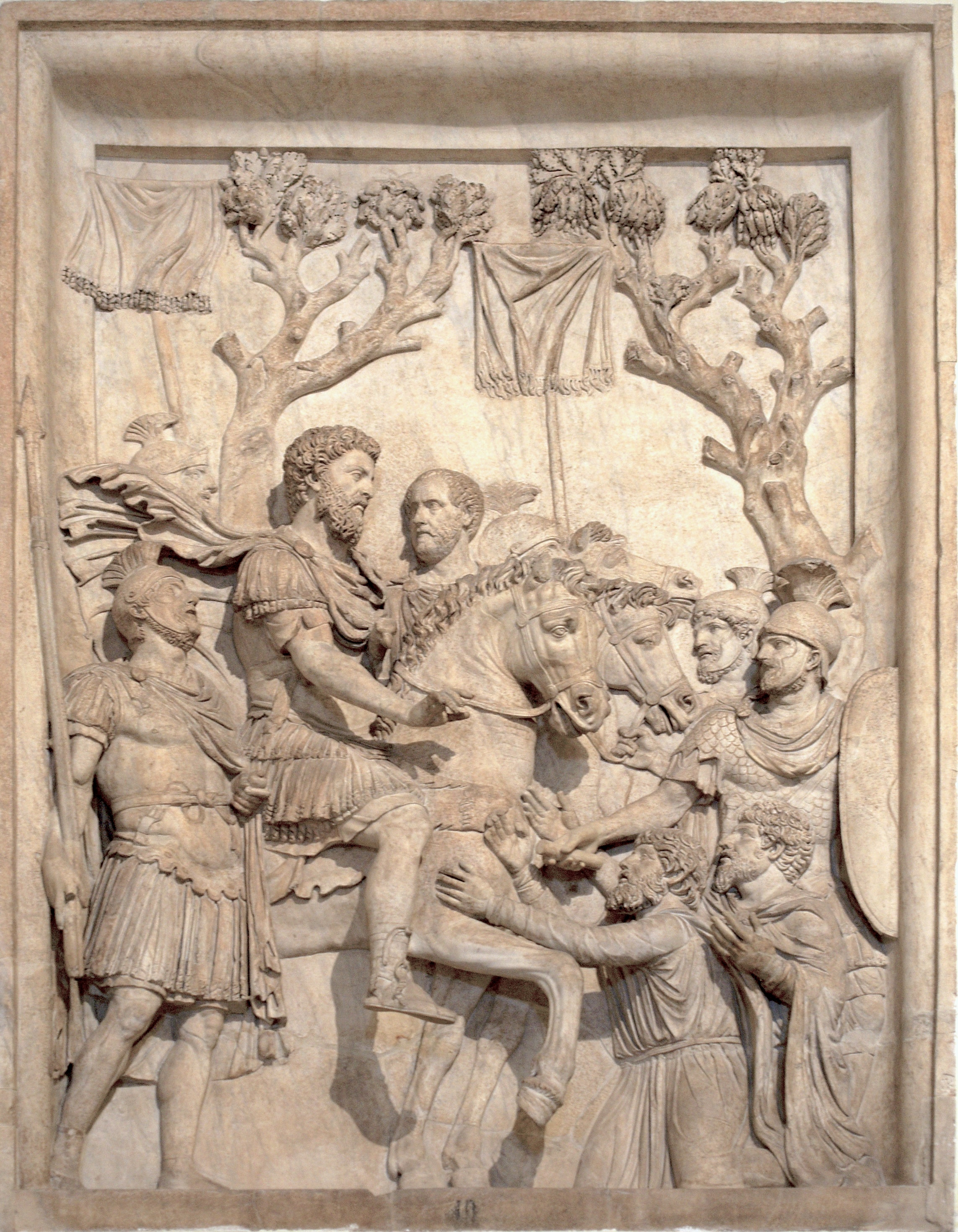
Marcus Aurelius with Two Barbarians
(Capitoline Museums)

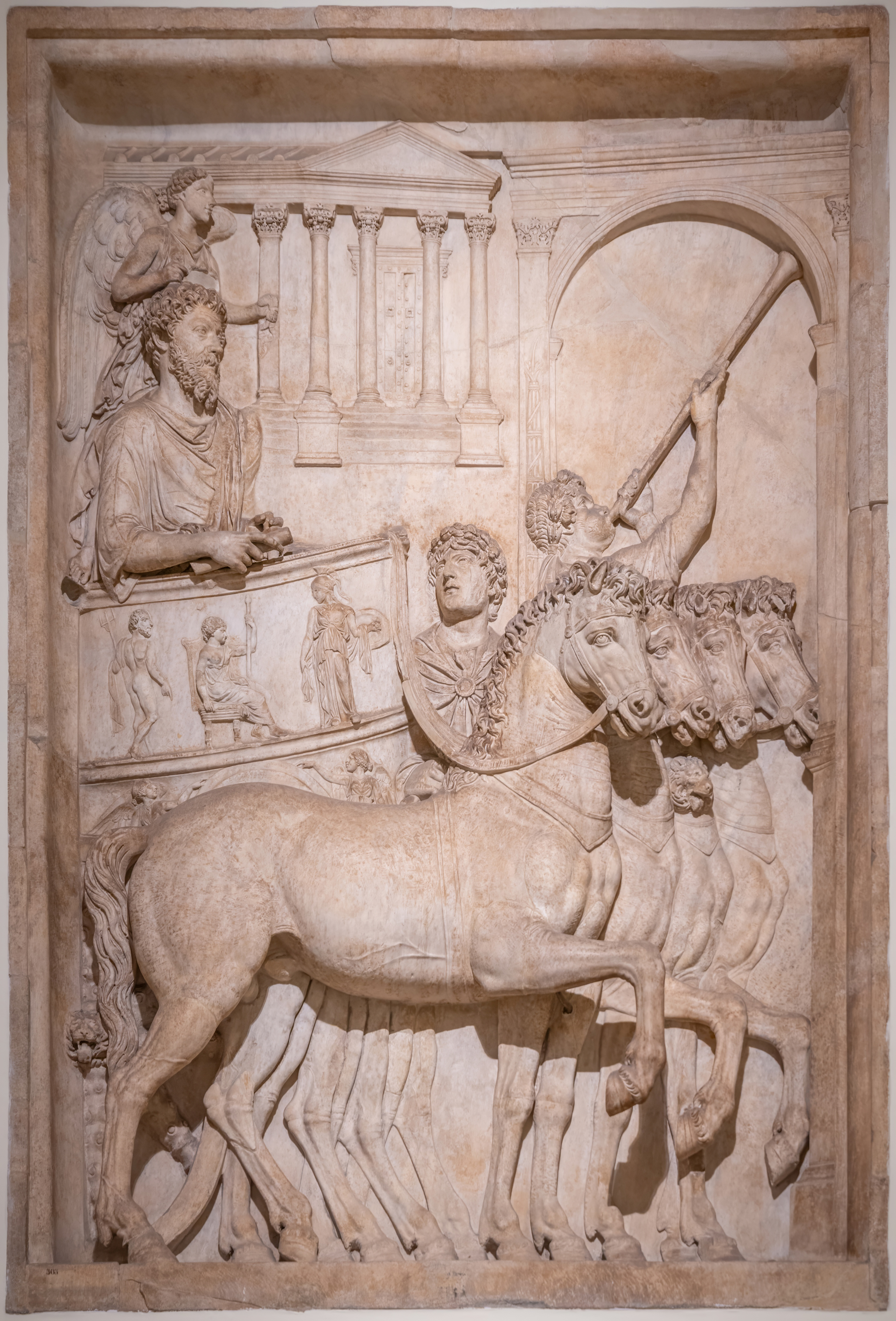
Roman Triumph of Marcus Aurelius
(Capitoline Museums)
