= Stecchi =

Stecchi is an Italian surname. Notable people with the surname include:

- Gianni Stecchi (born 1958), Italian pole vaulter
- Claudio Stecchi (born 1991), Italian pole vaulter

== See also ==
- Stocchi
