= Marcello Leopardi =

Italian painter

- Born: 1750; Potenza Picena
- Died: 1795 (aged 44–45)
- Occupation: painter
- Known for: sacred subjects and history, late-Baroque and early Neoclassic style
- Notable work: Guardian Angels altarpiece, Sant'Andrea a Subiaco church in Rome

Marcello Leopardi (1750–1795) was an Italian painter, depicting both sacred subjects and history in a late-Baroque and early Neoclassic style.

He was born presumably in Potenza Picena. By 1768, he was participating in contests sponsored by the Accademia del nudo in Campidoglio, Rome. In 1771, he won a third prize in a painting contest held by the Accademia di San Luca. He is cited as a pupil of either Stefano Pozzi or Tommaso Conca.

In 1782, he moved to Perugia, where he completed a number of paintings for the oratory of the Confraternita della Giustizia. He was one of the artists employed in decorating the Perugia Cathedral (1782–1785). He helped decorate the palazzi Conestabile della Staffa and Ranieri with frescoes depicting mythologic and classic history themes. He moved to Foligno, where he decorated other palaces.

He was commissioned by Pope Pius VI to complete an altarpiece of the Guardian Angels for the church of Sant'Andrea a Subiaco in Rome. He continued to work in Rome, often producing works for churches in other towns, including Viterbo. He painted three altarpieces for the church of San Michele Arcangelo ai Minoriti in Catania.

In 1794, he was elected academic of merit of the Accademia di San Luca of Rome, submitting an entry canvas depicting Amore e Psiche. The work was derided as scandalous by Tommaso Conca. In 1794 he also joined the Congregazione dei Virtuosi al Pantheon.

Vincenzo Ferreri of Perugia was a pupil.
