= Temple of Marcus Aurelius =

Temple in Rome

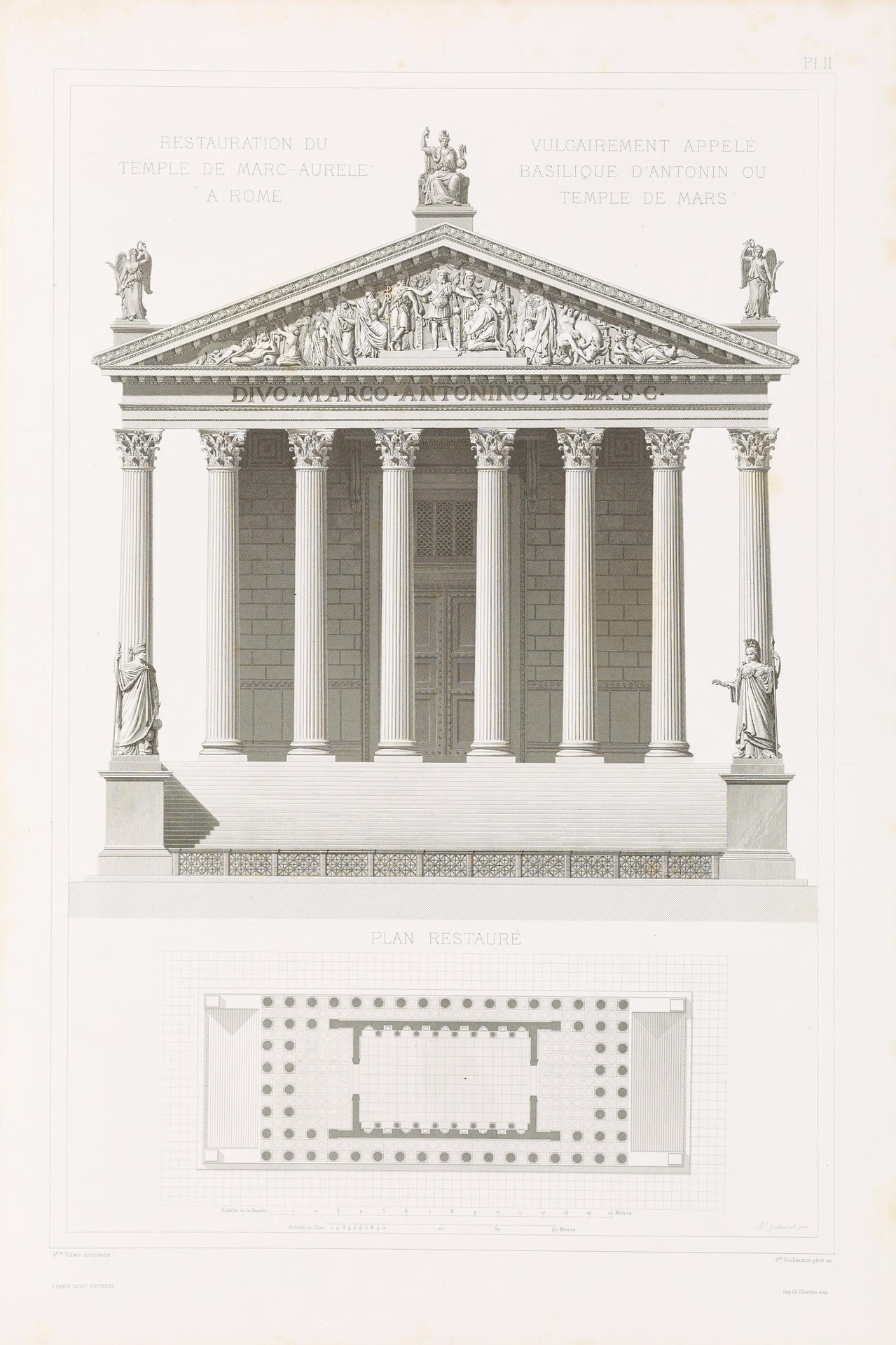
- Reconstruction of the temple by Alexandre Villain, 1824

- Shown in ancient Rome
- Interactive map of Temple of Marcus Aurelius
- 41°54′03″N 12°28′48″E

The Temple of Marcus Aurelius was a temple in Rome dedicated to the deified Roman emperor Marcus Aurelius by his son Commodus. The temple did not leave surviving archaeological remains, but was probably sited just to the west of the column of Marcus Aurelius, where now stands the Palazzo Wedekind on Piazza Colonna. A porticus probably surrounded both the temple and the column.

== See also ==
- List of Ancient Roman temples

== Bibliography ==
- Petersen, Domaszewski and Calderini, Die Marcussäule auf piazza Colonna, Munich 1896
- This article contains text from Platner and Ashby's A Topographical Dictionary of Ancient Rome, a text now in the public domain. - Column of Marcus Aurelius
