= San Michele Arcangelo ai Minoriti, Catania =

Church in the city center of Catania

Coordinates: 37.50617°N 15.08641°E

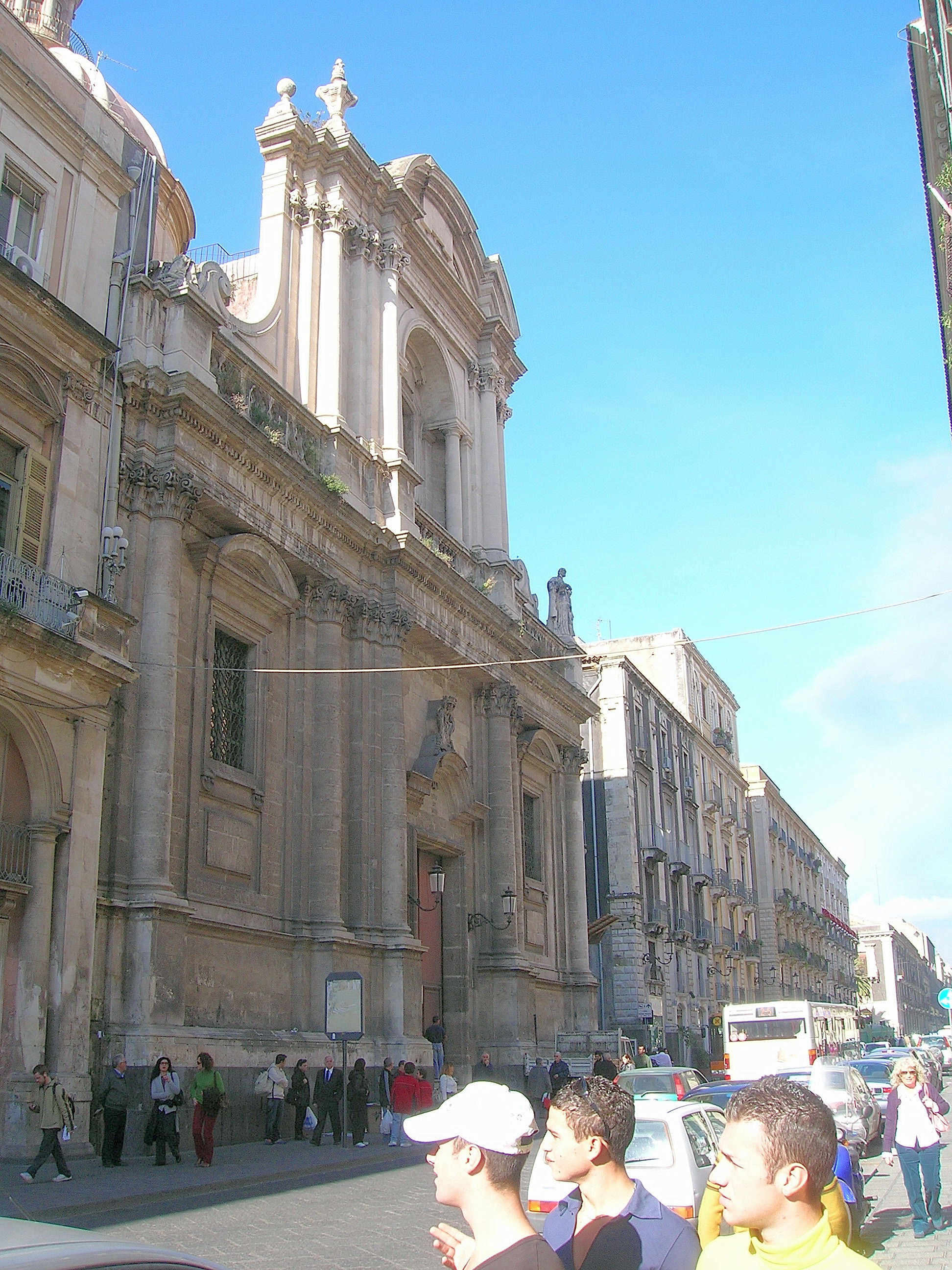
Facade of the Chiesa dei Minoriti

San Michele Arcangelo ai Minoriti is a Roman Catholic parish church and attached monastery in the city center of Catania, region of Sicily, Italy. The former monastery, to the left of the facade, now houses shops on the ground-floor, and above are the offices of the Provincial government and the Prefettura or Prefecture (National office in province).

== History ==
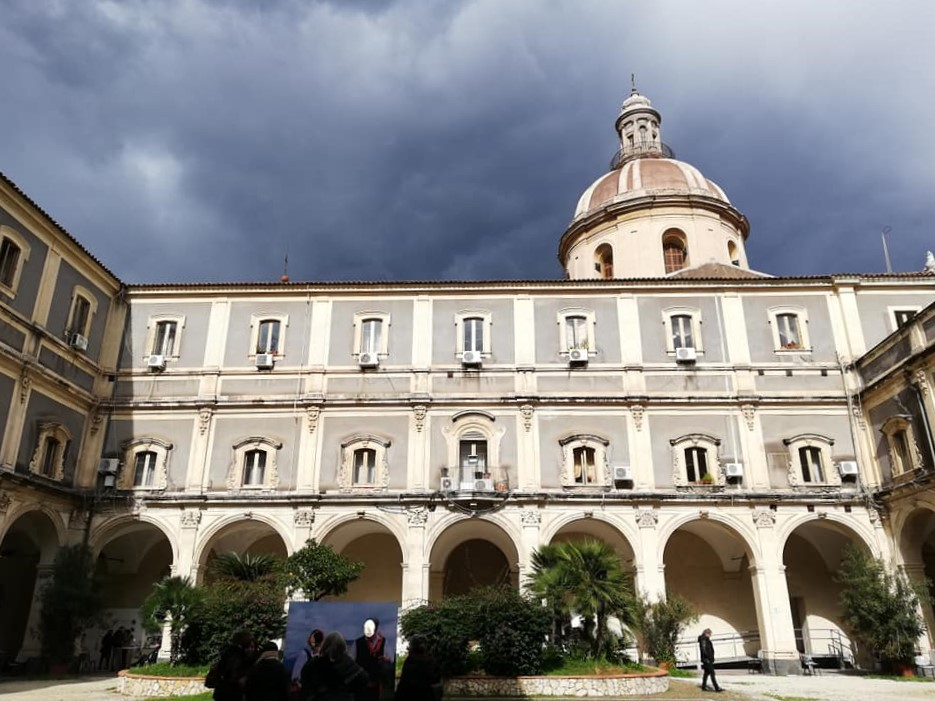
View of dome from inside the monastery cloister.

The Clerics Regular Minor, or Adorno Fathers, known in Italy as Caracciolini after their founder, Saint Francesco Caracciolo, and in Catania as Minoriti was an order of priests and brothers, approved by the pope in 1588, and mainly dedicated to pastoral care of the infirm and needy. They first came to Catania in 1625, on the invitation by the bishop Innocenzo Massimo. In 1628, they were assigned an old church dedicated to St Michael Archangel, located on what is now via Aetna. In 1630, the aristocrat Giambattista Paternò endowed the order with his inheritance. Like most of the town, the 1693 earthquake levelled the prior church, and the minorites commissioned a new church and monastery. The reconstruction was patronized by father superior Bartolomeo Asmundo, who survived the earthquake. The monastery was suppressed in 1866, and the property occupied by the deputies of the provincial council and the prefecture.

There is a second nearby church, now a parish church, with associated smaller convent that belonged to the friars of the same order: the church of the Immacolata Concezione Beata Maria vergine ai Minoritelli on via Gesualdo Clemente 11. That small Baroque church is also notable for being attached to an arch from the original Roman aqueduct of Catania.

== Description ==
The new church was designed by Stefano Ittar, and completed by Francesco Battaglia. The convent was mainly built by Battaglia. Flanking the facade on the left, atop the first story pediment is a statue of the blessed Bartolomeo Simorilli, first provost of the Catania church. On the same spot on the right once stood a statue of St Francis Caracciolo (founder of Minoriti order), but it was destroyed by Allied World War II bombardment. The pilaster-rich Baroque facade has a marble stairway, which internally leads to a double staircase. The interior has a central nave and two aisles. The cupola, begun in 1771, as completed in 1787. It is covered inside with blue tiles, that have a shimmering sky blue color on sunny days.

In the southern nave is an altarpiece depicting St Agatha of Sicily pleads for the sparing of Catania by Marcello Leopardi. He also painted two other altarpieces: one of the Glory of St Joseph and of St Francesco Caracciolo, the latter completed by Leopardi's pupil Ferreri. There is also an altarpiece depicting Angel St Raphael and Tobias by Giovannina M. Piazza. There is an altarpiece depicting the Virgin of the Annunciation by Guglielmo Borremans. The main altar is surrounded by wooden stalls for the monks. The organ is richly decorated.

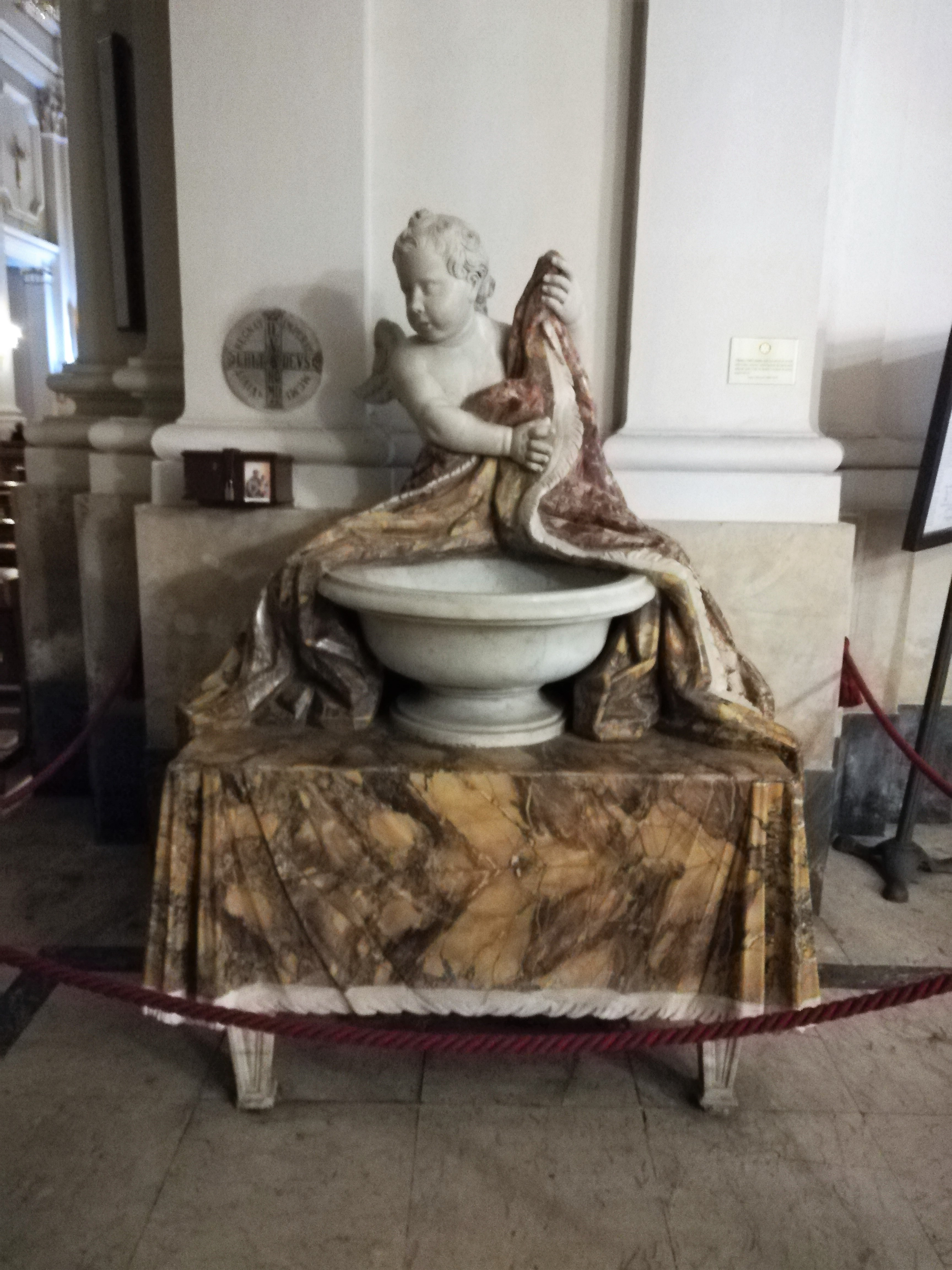
Holy water font made from polychrome marble

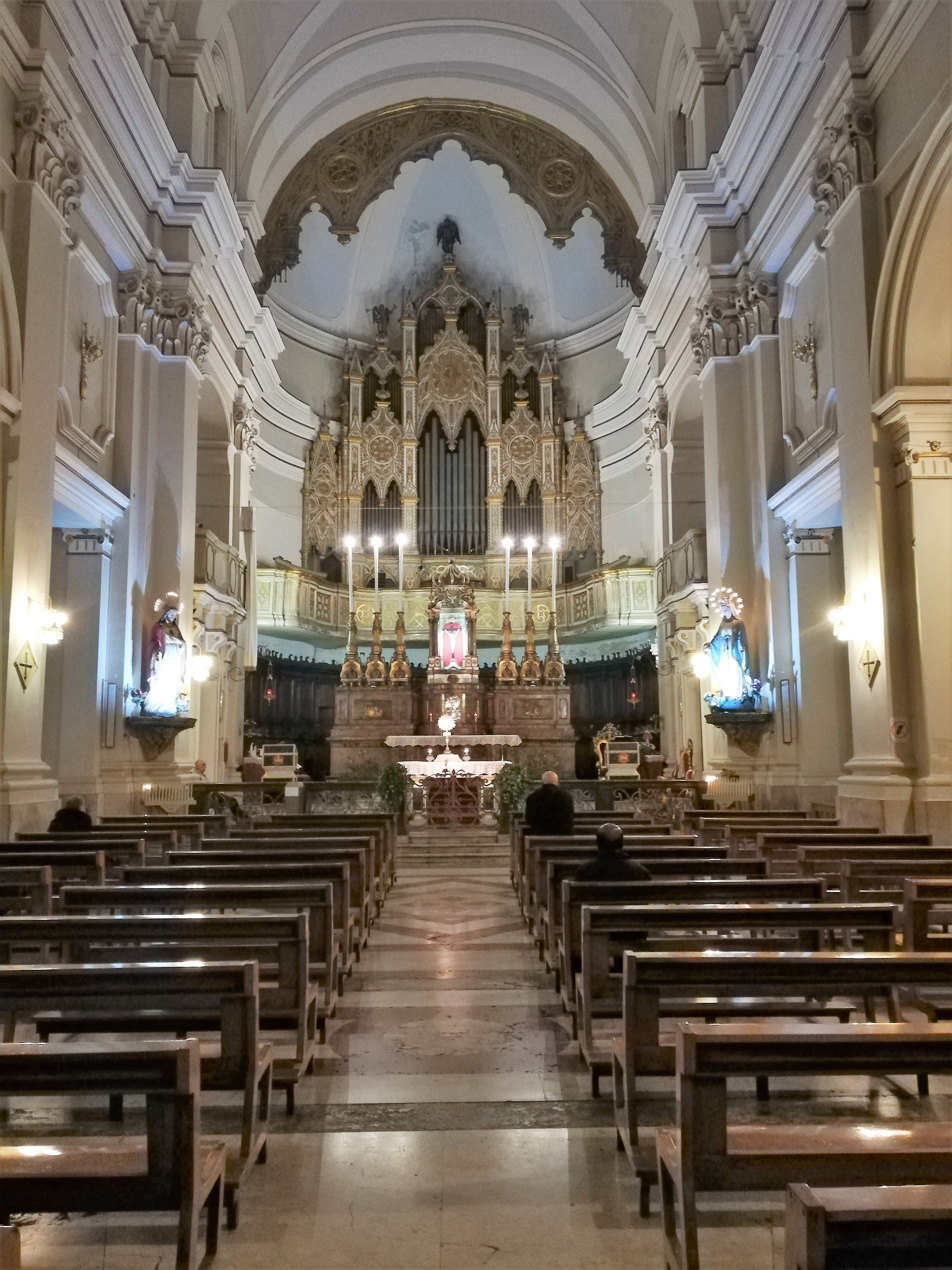
View of the apse with organ and hemicycle of choir stalls

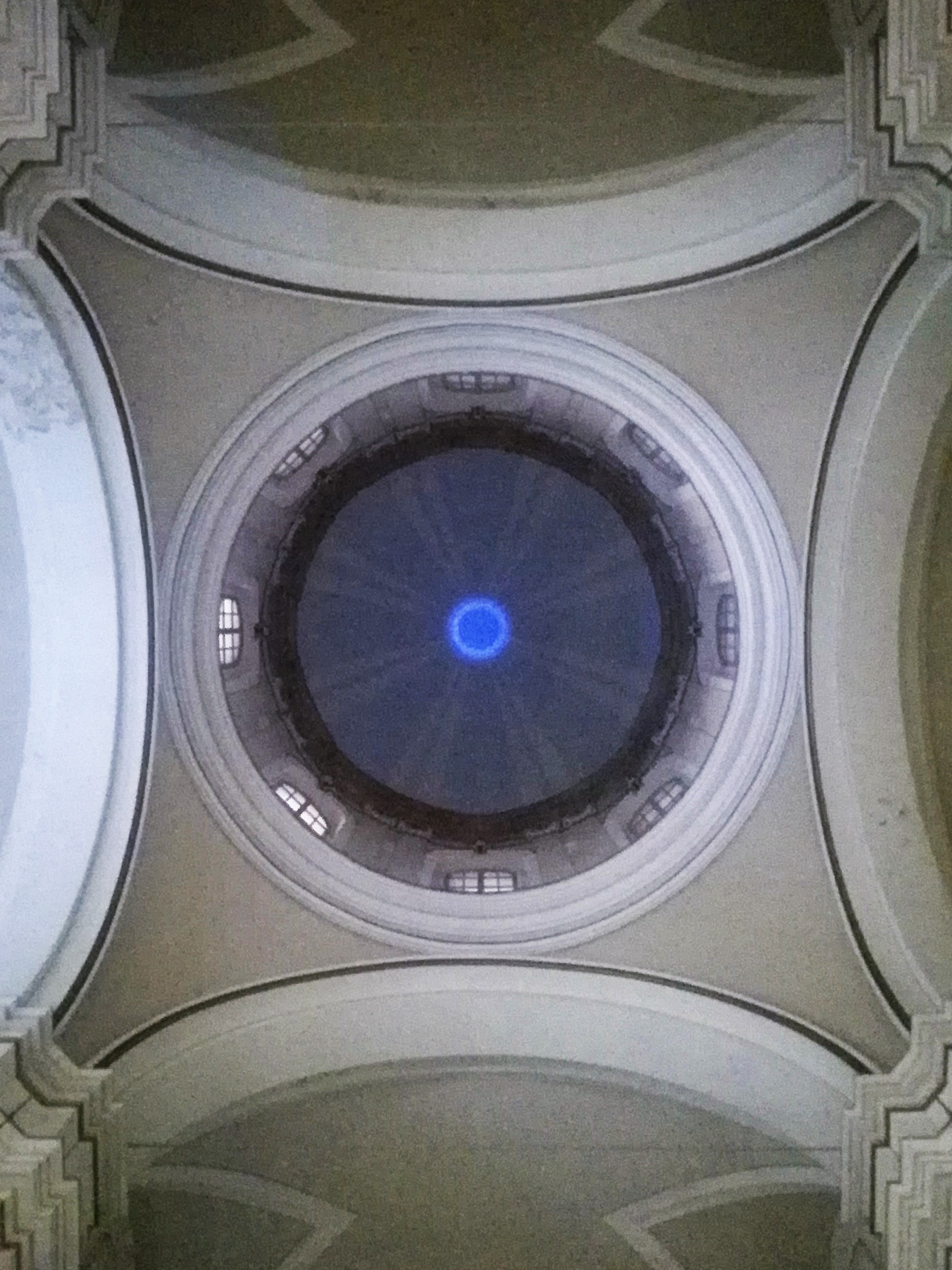
Interior of dome

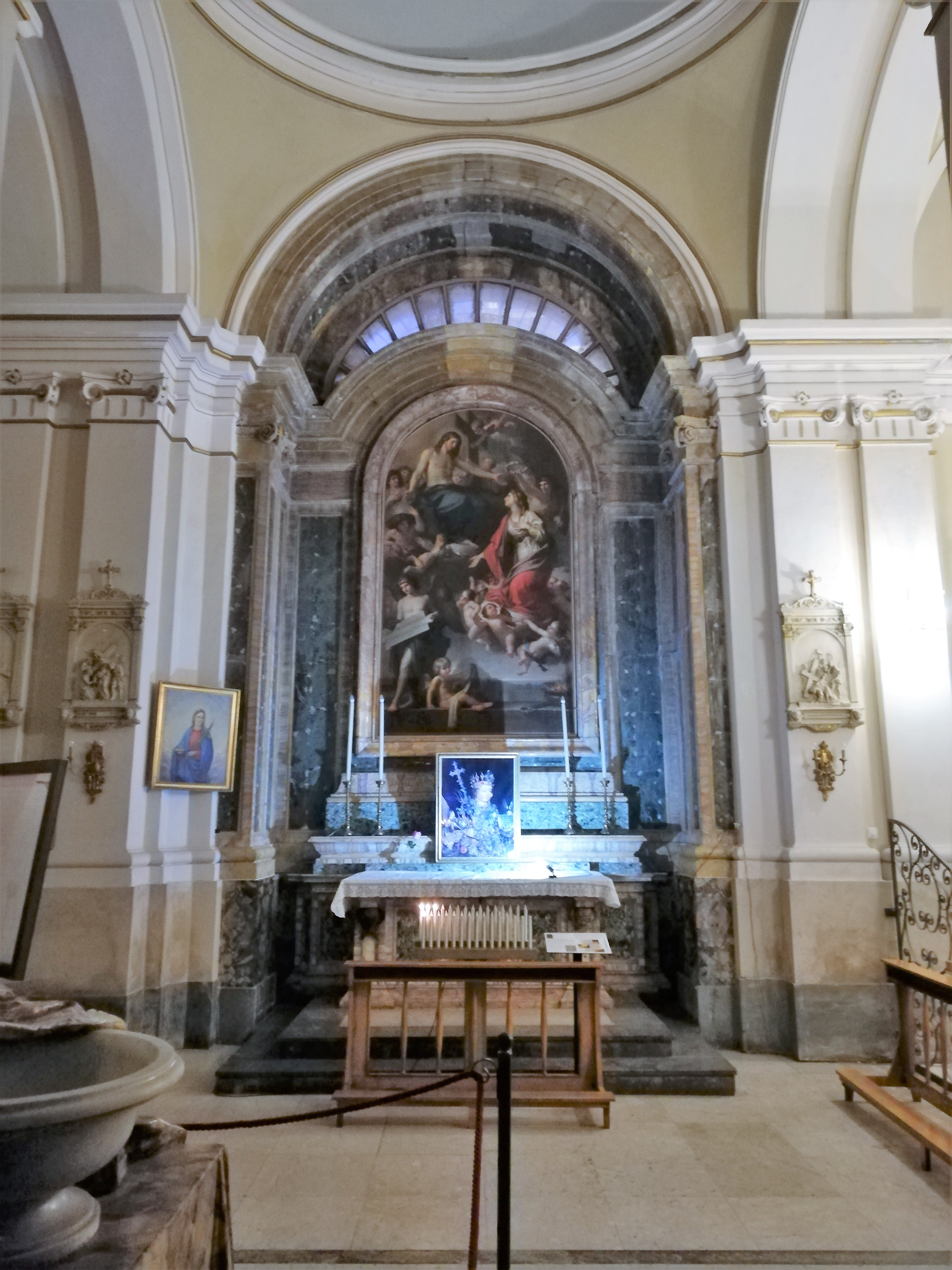
St Agatha altarpiece by Leopardi

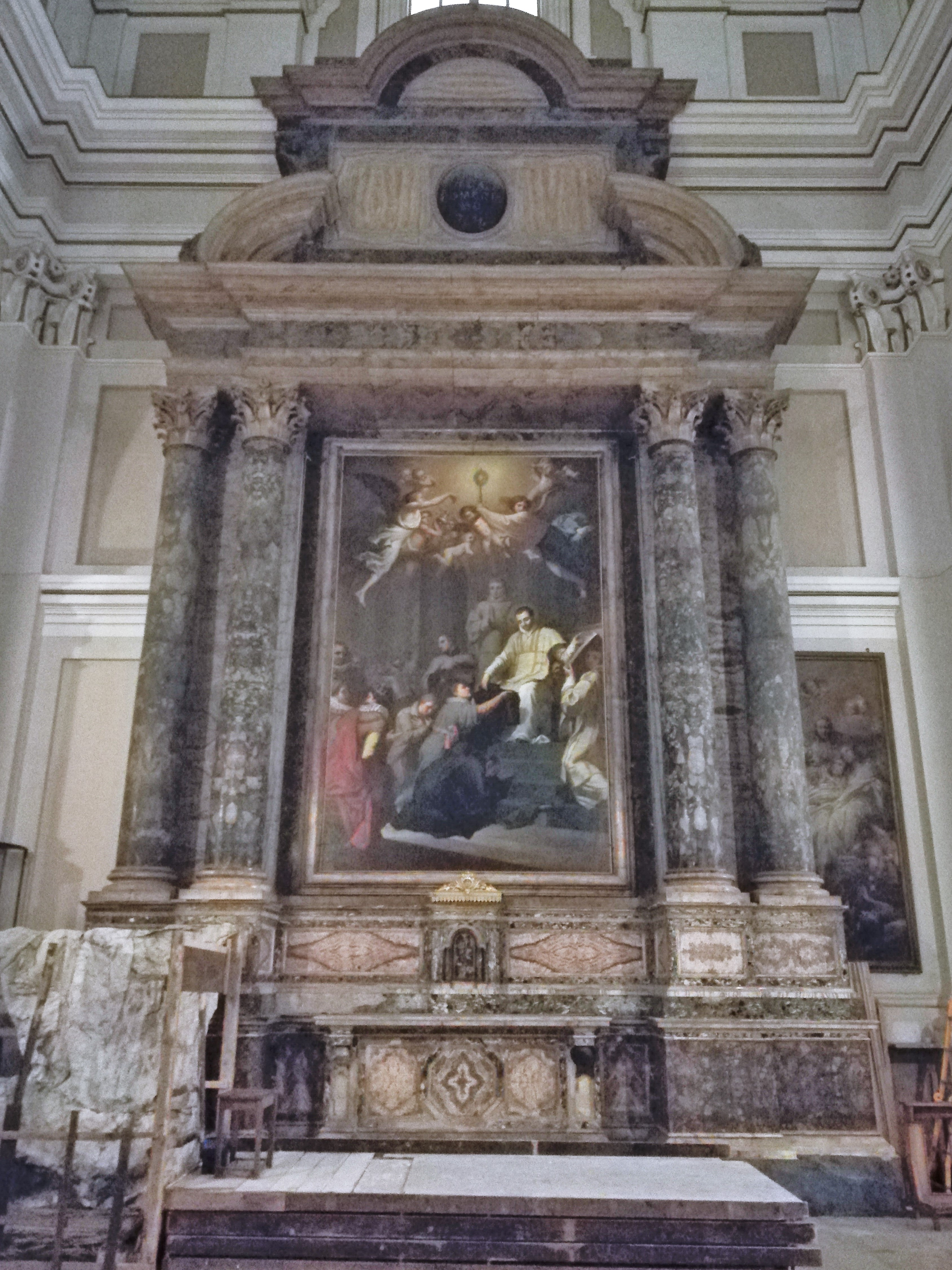
St Francis Caracciolo by Leopardi

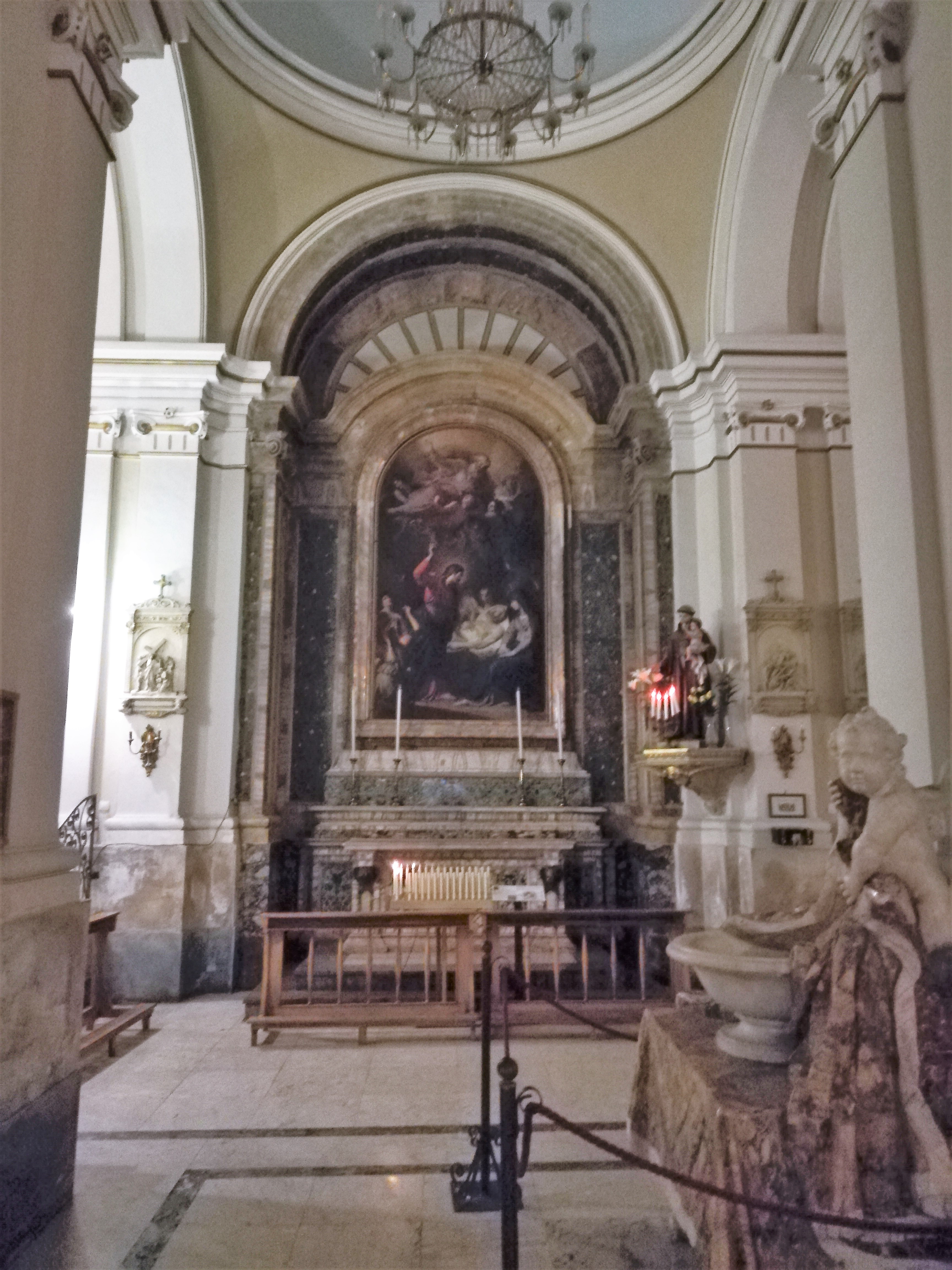
Glory of St Joseph by Leopardi

== See also ==
- 18th-century Western domes
