= Santi Bartolomeo ed Alessandro dei Bergamaschi =

- Church of Saints Bartholomew and Alexander of the Bergamasques
- Chiesa di Santi Bartolomeo ed Alessandro dei Bergamaschi
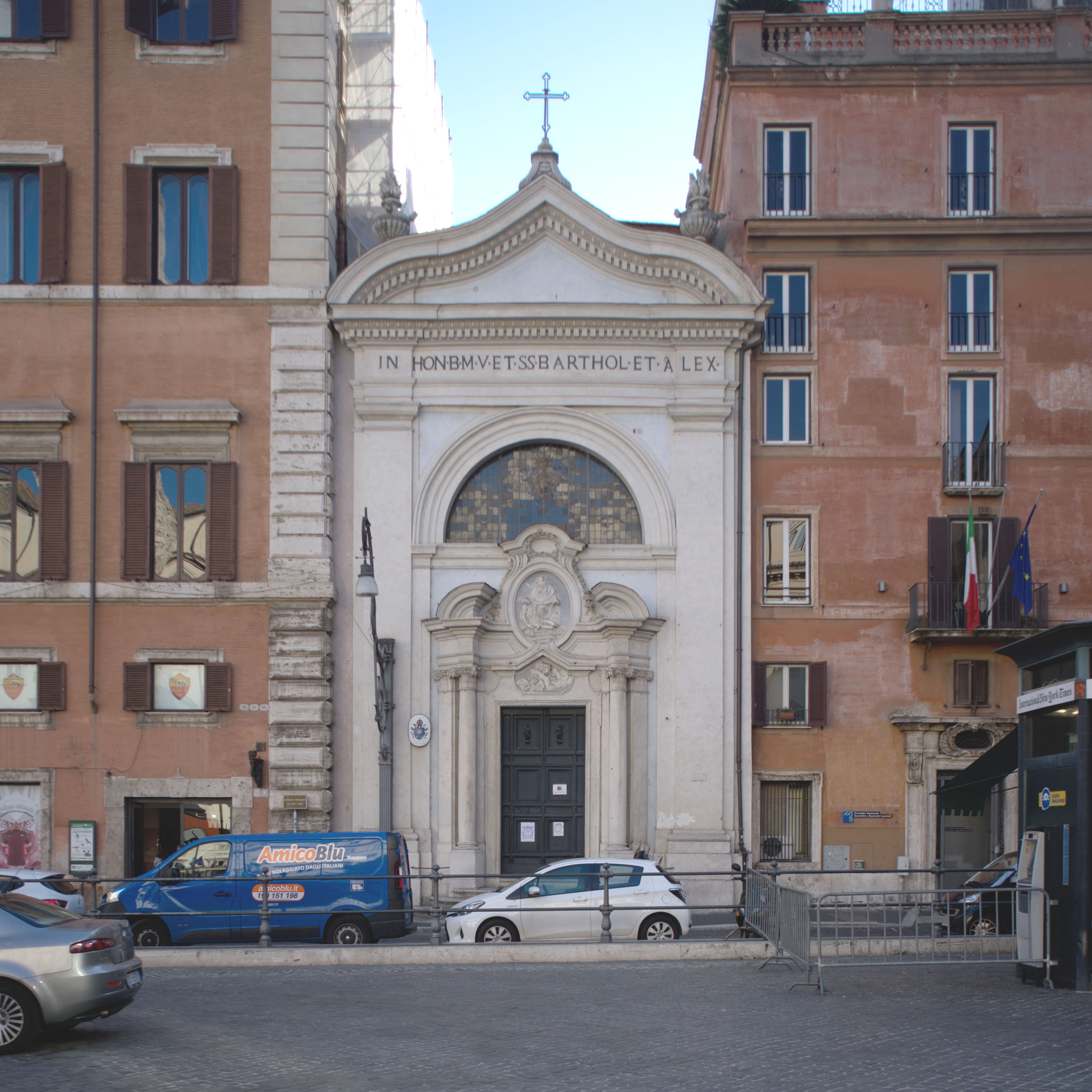
- Click on the map for a fullscreen view
- 41°54′02″N 12°28′48″E
- Location: Via di Petra 70, Colonna, Rome
- Country: Italy
- Language: Italian
- Denomination: Catholic
- Tradition: Roman Rite
- Website: arciconfraternitabergamaschi.it

History
- Status: regional church
- Dedication: Bartholomew the Apostle and Alexander of Bergamo

Architecture
- Functional status: active
- Architectural type: Baroque
- Groundbreaking: 1591
- Completed: 1735

Administration
- Diocese: Rome

Santi Bartolomeo ed Alessandro dei Bergamaschi (Saints Bartholomew and Alexander of the Bergamasque people) is a little church in Piazza Colonna in Rome, Italy, next to Palazzo Wedekind. Originally it was named Santa Maria della Pietà (Saint Mary of Pity), from the high relief over the door. The present Santa Maria della Pietà in Rome is in Vatican City.

In its origins (1591) the church was the chapel erected by padre Ferrante Ruiz for the Ospedale dei Pazzarelli, Rome's first insane asylum. When this was moved to Via della Lungara in the 1720s, the church was given over to the Archiconfraternità dei Bergamaschi, who rebuilt it in 1731–35 to designs of Giuseppe Valvassori, added their patron saint to its dedication and used the hospital for their own sick. It is the burial place of Cardinal Giuseppe Alessandro Furietti, antiquarian and native of Bergamo.

It is looked after by the Arciconfraternità, a historic association of Bergamaschi living in Rome that was begun in 1539. It supports understanding of the culture, the values and the traditions of Bergamo and their fertile dialogue with those of Rome.

The Church hosted a painting of the Seven Archangels whose names had been scratched out by order of Cardinal Albizzi.
