= Palazzo Wedekind =

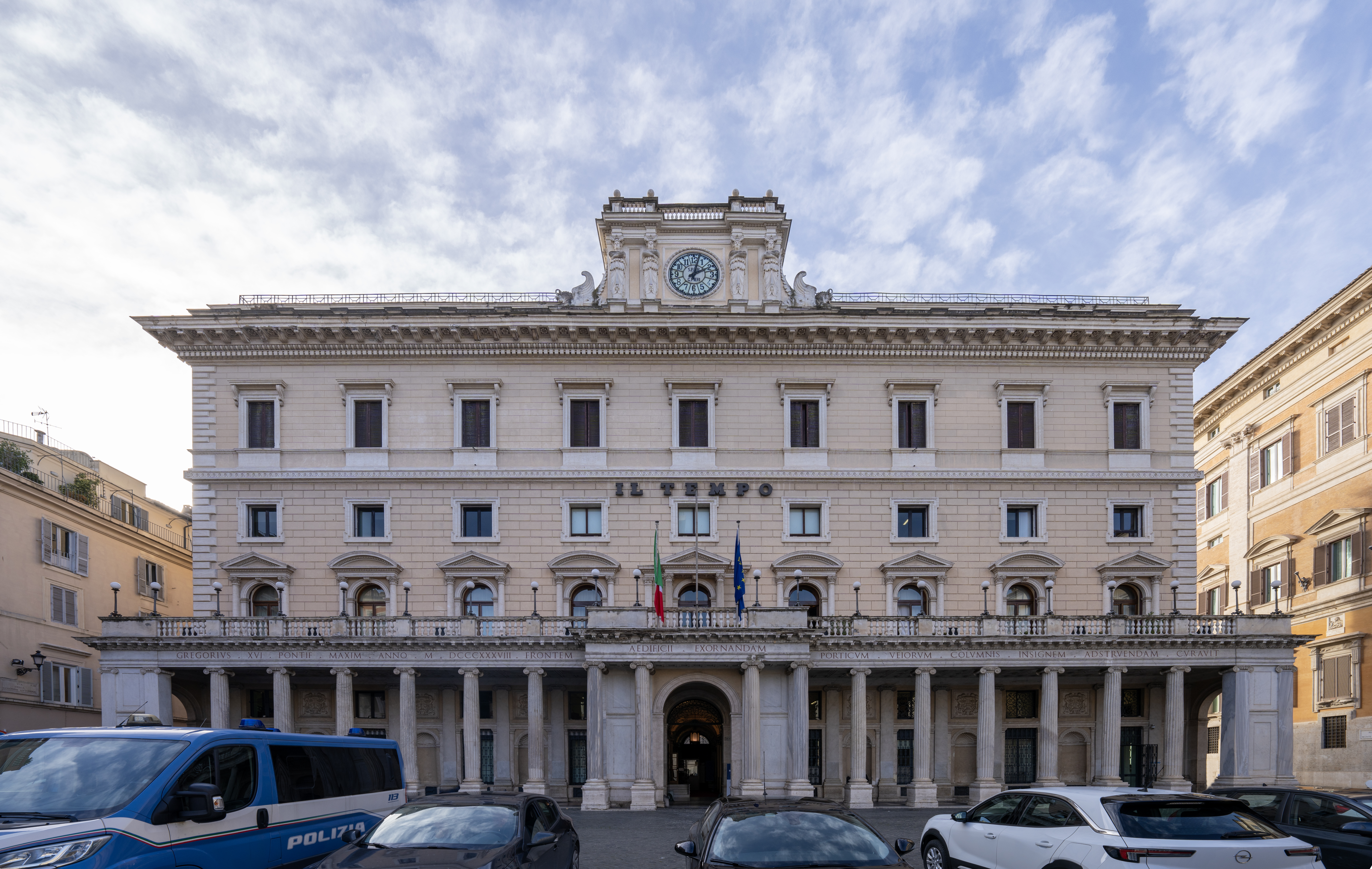
- Palazzo Wedekind
- Click on the map for a fullscreen view

General information
- Architectural style: Neoclassical
- Location: Rome, Italy
- Coordinates: 41°54′02″N 12°28′46″E
- Completed: 1838

Design and construction
- Architects: Giovanni Battista Giovenale, Pietro Camporese il Giovanni
- Designations: Karl Wedekind

Palazzo Wedekind is a palazzo in Piazza Colonna in Rome, Italy, located next to the church of Santi Bartolomeo ed Alessandro dei Bergamaschi. It is notable as the historic offices of the daily paper Il Tempo.

== History ==
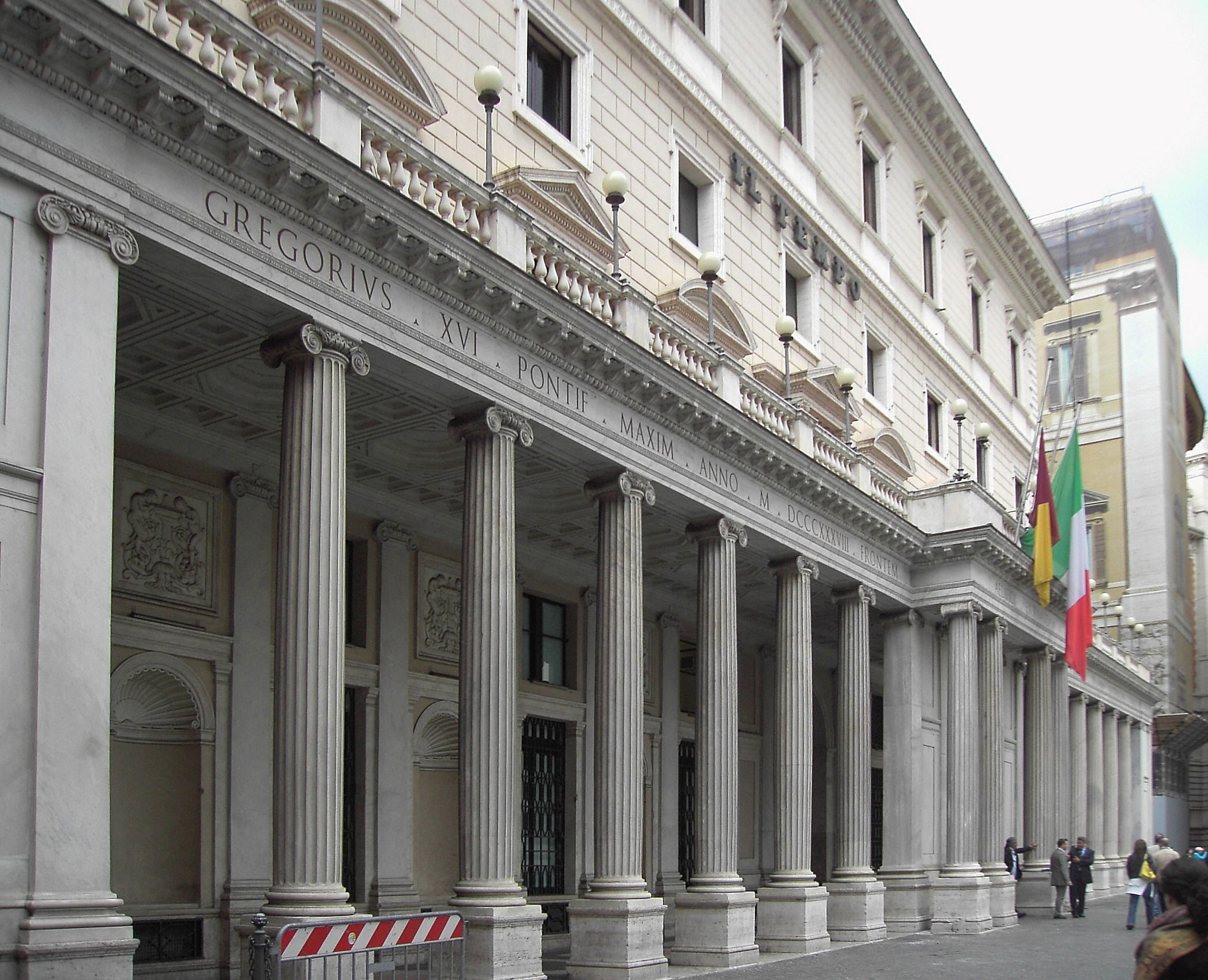
The Veii columns at Palazzo Wedekind

On a site occupied in antiquity by the Temple of Marcus Aurelius, the medieval buildings on the site were cleared for a structure erected by the Ludovisi (1659) that became the offices of the vicegerente of the vicariate of Rome. To house the general director of the postal service for the Papal States, who moved here in 1814, the palazzo was completely rebuilt by Pope Gregory XVI to designs by Giuseppe Valadier carried out by Pietro Camporese the Younger. At Valadier's urging, Camporese added a portico built with twelve elegant Roman columns brought from the ruins of Veii, supplemented with two pairs of columns flanking the main doorway, retrieved from the basilica of San Paolo fuori le Mura, which burned in 1823.

== Name ==
In 1852 it was bought by the rich banker Karl Wedekind, who rebuilt its interiors to plans by G.B. Giovenale. From 1871 the palazzo housed the Kingdom of Italy's Ministry of Education. For a short time in September 1943 until the liberation of Rome, the palazzo was the official base of the Fascisti romani.

== Notes ==
Preceded by Palazzo del Viminale	Landmarks of Rome; Palazzo Wedekind	Succeeded by Palazzo Zuccari, Rome
