= Stocchi =

Stocchi is an Italian surname. Notable people with the surname include:

- Achille Stocchi, 19th-century Italian sculptor
- John Stocchi (born 1937), South African Olympic rower
- Luca Stocchi (born 1991), Italian footballer
- Vittore Stocchi (1895–1987), Italian Olympic rower
