= Pietro Camporese the Younger =

Italian neoclassical architect

- Born: 22 May 1792; Rome, Papal States
- Died: 23 February 1873 (aged 80); Rome, Kingdom of Italy
- Known for: Architecture
- Notable work: Palazzo Wedekind
- Movement: Baroque and Neoclassicism

Pietro Camporese the Younger (22 May 1792 – 23 February 1873) was an Italian Neoclassical architect. He was the grandson of the architect Pietro Camporese the Elder.

== Biography ==
Pietro Camporese the Younger was the son of Giulio Camporese. He studied at the Accademia di San Luca with his father and Pasquale Belli, and nearly all his work was carried out in Rome.

In 1823, a fire destroyed the Basilica of Saint Paul Outside the Walls, and Pietro was appointed to the committee of architects that oversaw its rebuilding under Belli’s direction. His experiences here no doubt reinforced his familial inclinations toward a dry, rational and academic classical revivalism.

Between 1831 and 1846 he restored the hospital of San Giacomo in Augusta (degli Incurabili) and remodelled the façades adjacent to its church and along Via Antonio Canova. Here antique and Renaissance motifs were distilled to the simplest possible contours and details and yet powerfully modelled, as proof of the architect’s pedigree. He also restored the church of Santi Vito e Modesto (1834) and the Teatro Argentina (1837).

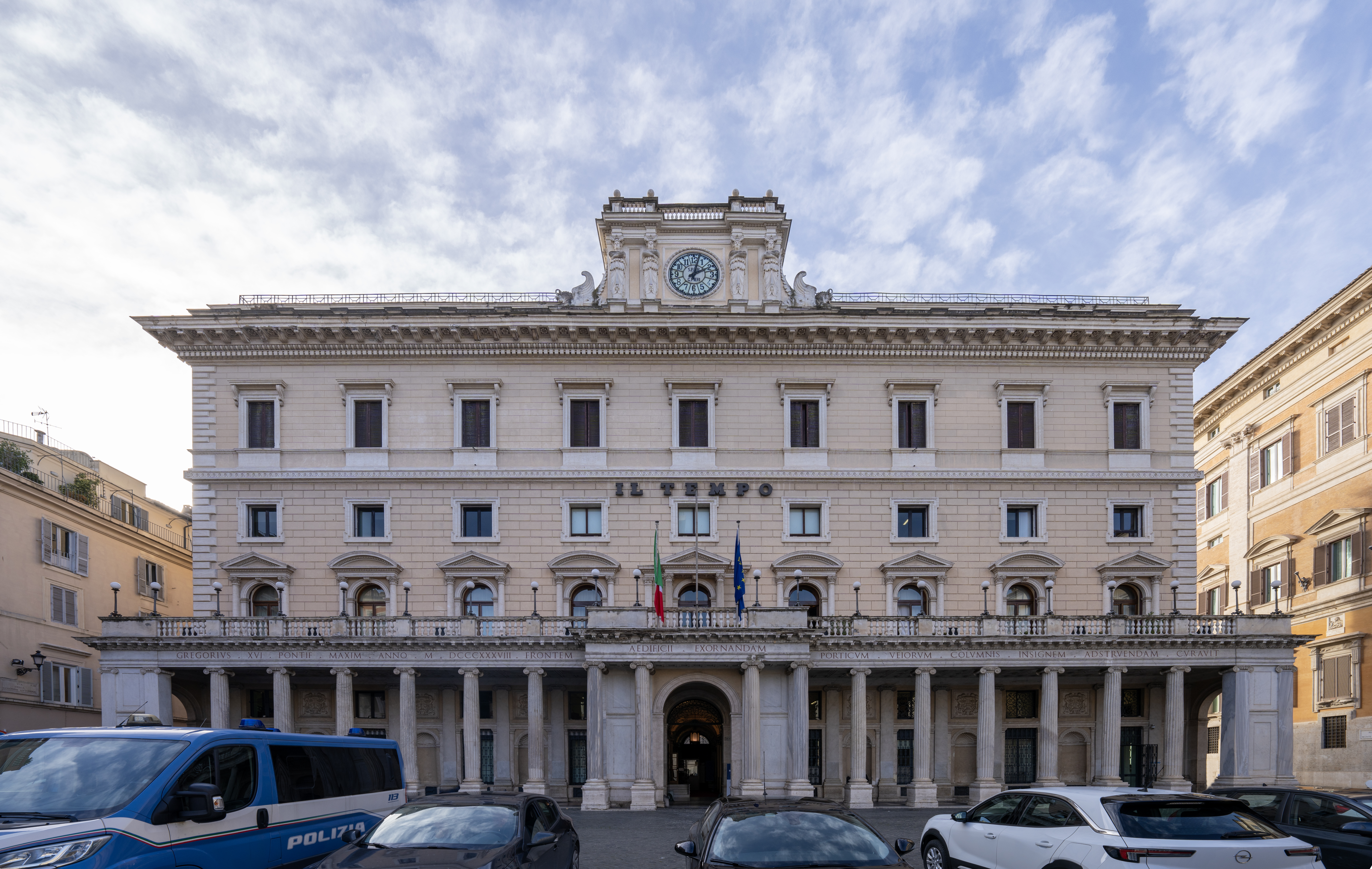
Palazzo Wedekind, Rome

Pietro’s façade for the Palazzo Wedekind on the Piazza Colonna dates from 1838. To what was then a pontifical post office, he added a Renaissance Revival front and attached a portico of 16 Ionic columns supporting a terrace. 12 of the columns came from the Porticus Augusta (late 1st century BC) excavated at Veii in 1812–17, but accents at the centre and ends of the colonnade give it a 16th-century character as much as an antiquarian one. The real success of the design lies in the way that the ‘stoa’ gives new sense to the urban space of the piazza, dramatizing its relationship to the column of Marcus Aurelius and Via del Corso beyond while providing more shelter for public activity.

In the design of the Accademia di Belle Arti di Roma (1845) for Pope Gregory XVI, Pietro again tried to draw advantage from a difficult urban situation. With its back to the River Tiber and its front on the narrow Via di Ripetta, the building embraces the street through the horseshoe plan at the centre of the façade and in turn enlivens an otherwise monotonous and confining street contour. The design fails in its detailing, however, which lacks the grandeur appropriate to the plan and is executed in the poorest materials. In that regard, the impoverishment of the papacy in recent years could no longer support the standards that the Camporese family had once championed. The same could be said of his reconstruction of the Ospedale degli Orfanelli on the Piazza Capranica, with its plain stuccoed façades and courtyard arches of brick in thin beds of mortar.

In the early 1870s Pietro was put in charge of the commission planning the expansion of the city as the new capital of a united Italy. As president of the Accademia di San Luca, he also served on the jury for the design of the façade of Florence Cathedral.

== Selected works ==
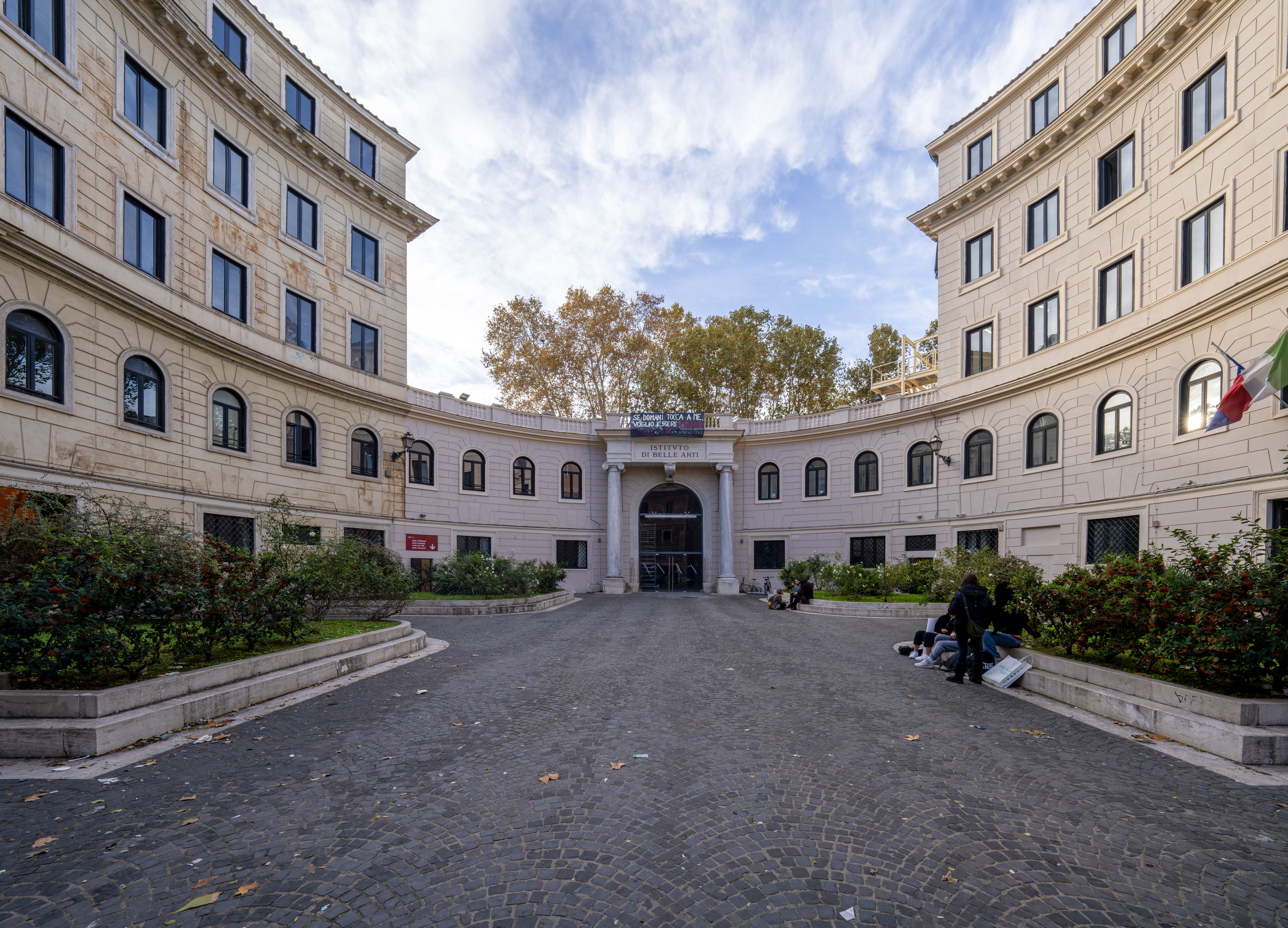
Accademia di Belle Arti, Rome, 1845

- Reconstruction of the Basilica of Saint Paul Outside the Walls.
- Renovation of the church of Santi Vito e Modesto, Rome.
- Renovation of the Teatro Argentina, Rome.
- Palazzo Wedekind, Rome.
- Accademia di Belle Arti, Rome.
- Ospedale degli Orfanelli, Rome.

== Bibliography ==
- Fischer, Manfred F. (1974). "CAMPORESE, Pietro, il Giovane". Dizionario Biografico degli Italiani (in Italian). Vol. 17: Calvart–Canefri. Rome: Istituto dell'Enciclopedia Italiana. ISBN 978-88-12-00032-6.
