= Achille Stocchi =

Italian sculptor

Achille Stocchi (dates uncertain, died after 1870) was an Italian sculptor who worked in Rome in the mid-nineteenth century.

His father was Amadeo Stocchi, a sculptor in the studio of Antonio Canova, who began well by winning a prize from the Accademia di San Luca but vanished in obscurity.

In Giuseppe Valadier's systemization of Piazza del Popolo, Stocchi provided the Autumn in the set of seasons the crown the exedras that delimit the piazza east and west. (TCI). He was among the team of sculptors working in the Torlonia Chapel in San Giovanni in Laterano under the architect Quintiliano Raimondi (TCI) He provided the dolphins added to the fountain in Piazza Colonna.

In 1863 Achille Stocchi suggested a monument, for which he provided the plaster bozzetto (1867), commemorating the disfide di Barletta, 1503, when thirteen Italian champions turned back French forces in the city of Barletta; it was intended for the gardens of piazza Castello, but was not cast in bronze until 1980, long after Stocchi's death; it was reinstalled (2001) in a more prominent position, in piazza Fratelli Cervi. It shows the local hero Ettore Fieramosca besting the French knight Guy de la Motte.
