= Pietro Camporese the Elder =

- Born: 20 October 1726; Rome, Papal States
- Died: 1781 (aged 54–55); Rome, Papal States
- Known for: Architecture
- Notable work: Basilica of Sant'Andrea, Subiaco
- Movement: Baroque and Neoclassicism

Pietro Camporese the Elder (20 October 1726 – 1781) was an Italian architect. His architecture is typical of the eclectic tendency of Roman architects of the late 18th century, before neoclassical architecture (as represented by the styles of his two sons) fully asserted itself. Pietro Camporese the Elder looked to late Baroque models, though at the same time showed clear influences from Luigi Vanvitelli.

== Life ==
=== Early life and education ===
Camporese was born and died in Rome, the first of a family of architects active in the city in the 18th and 19th centuries. His sons Giuseppe and Giulio are recorded as collaborating with their father on the building of the Duomo at Subiaco, and his grandchild Pietro Camporese the Younger (1792–1873), who led the reconstruction of Rome's basilica of San Paolo fuori le Mura.

He studied at the Accademia di San Luca with Francesco Nicoletti (c. 1700–76). A student competition project for a cathedral complex (1754; Rome, Accademia Nazionale di San Luca) suggests that he began his career with a conservative temperament, favouring neither the waning Rococo nor the emerging Neoclassicism of Giovanni Battista Piranesi’s generation. This conservatism is also apparent in his completion (1774) of the upper register of the façade of Santa Maria in Aquiro, Rome; Francesco da Volterra’s design remained unfinished from 1590, and Pietro remained faithful to the original style.

=== Career ===
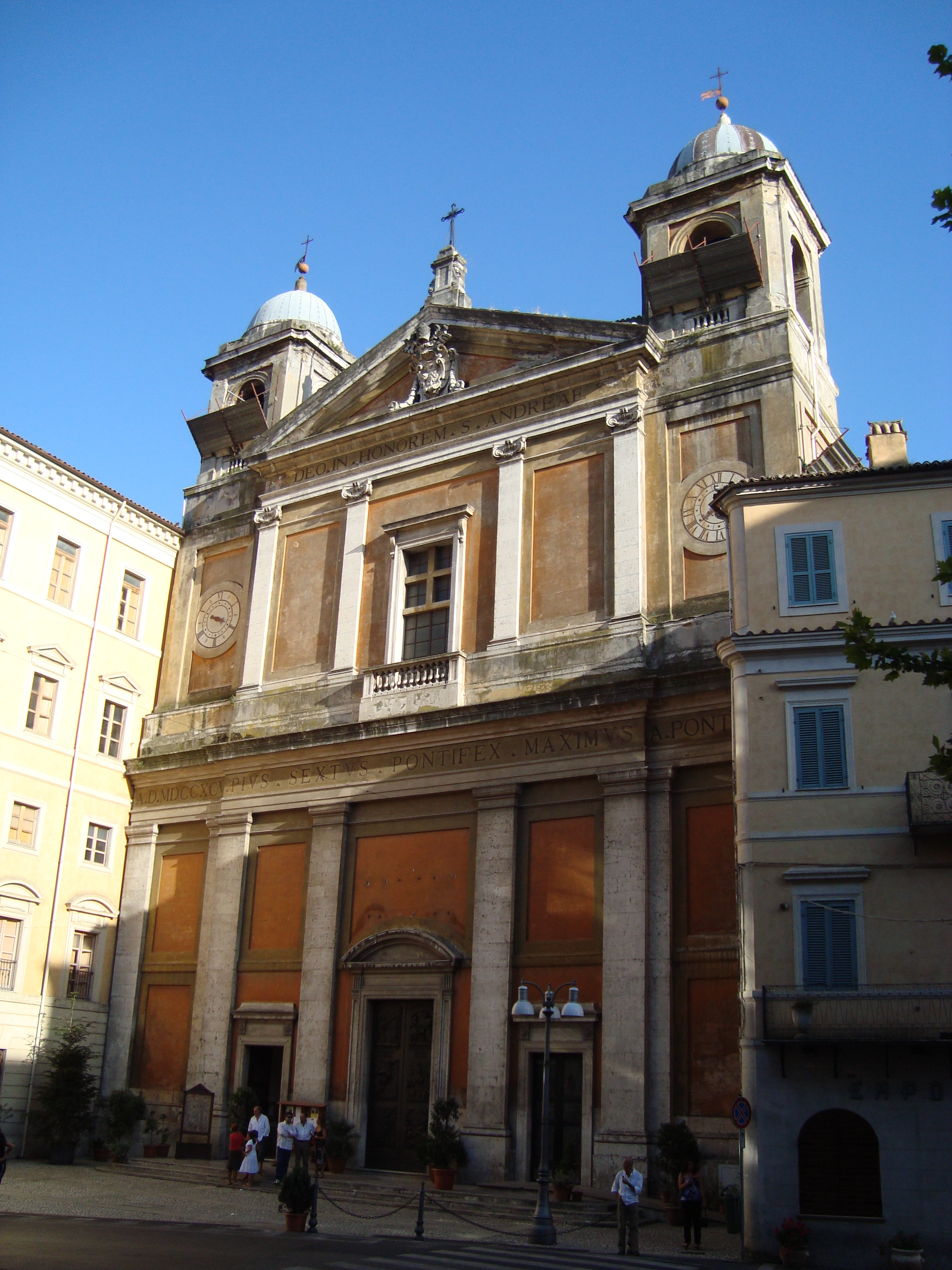
Basilica of Sant'Andrea, Subiaco

Pietro was admitted to membership of the Accademia in 1775, upon the accession of his principal patron, Pope Pius VI. At about that time Pius commissioned him to build the Basilica of Sant'Andrea, Subiaco. In the intervening decades since his competition design, however, he had settled upon a personal compromise between his academic training and recent architectural trends. The cathedral consists of traditional, 16th-century forms expressed in a Neoclassical language. Together with the adjoining Palazzo del Seminario (1715), the extension of which he took over from Carlo Colombi di Merate (fl. mid- 18th century), the cathedral forms a complex of severe masses standing like a fortress on the high escarpment overlooking the valley of the River Aniene.

The buildings were completed to Pietro’s designs by his sons in 1789. The family’s work at Subiaco, which also included an arch dedicated to Pius VI, began to establish its reputation for stone- and brickwork of the highest technical quality, reviving ancient practices on the advice of such contemporary theorists as Johann Joachim Winckelmann.

After 1775 Pietro collaborated with Michelangelo Simonetti on the construction of the Museo Pio-Clementino in the Vatican, where Giuseppe Camporese also worked. About 1779 he restored the church of Sant'Orsola for the Ursuline convent (now the Conservatorio Santa Cecilia) at Rome. The interior (now a theatre) is entirely white and detailed with austere elegance.

Also by Pietro, but of unknown date, is the Palazzo del Collegio Germanico, on the Via della Scrofa in Rome. Its brick veneer is meant to echo the nearby façade of the Palazzo di Sant'Apollinare (1745) by Ferdinando Fuga, but its severity and brooding melancholy are Pietro’s.

== Selected works ==
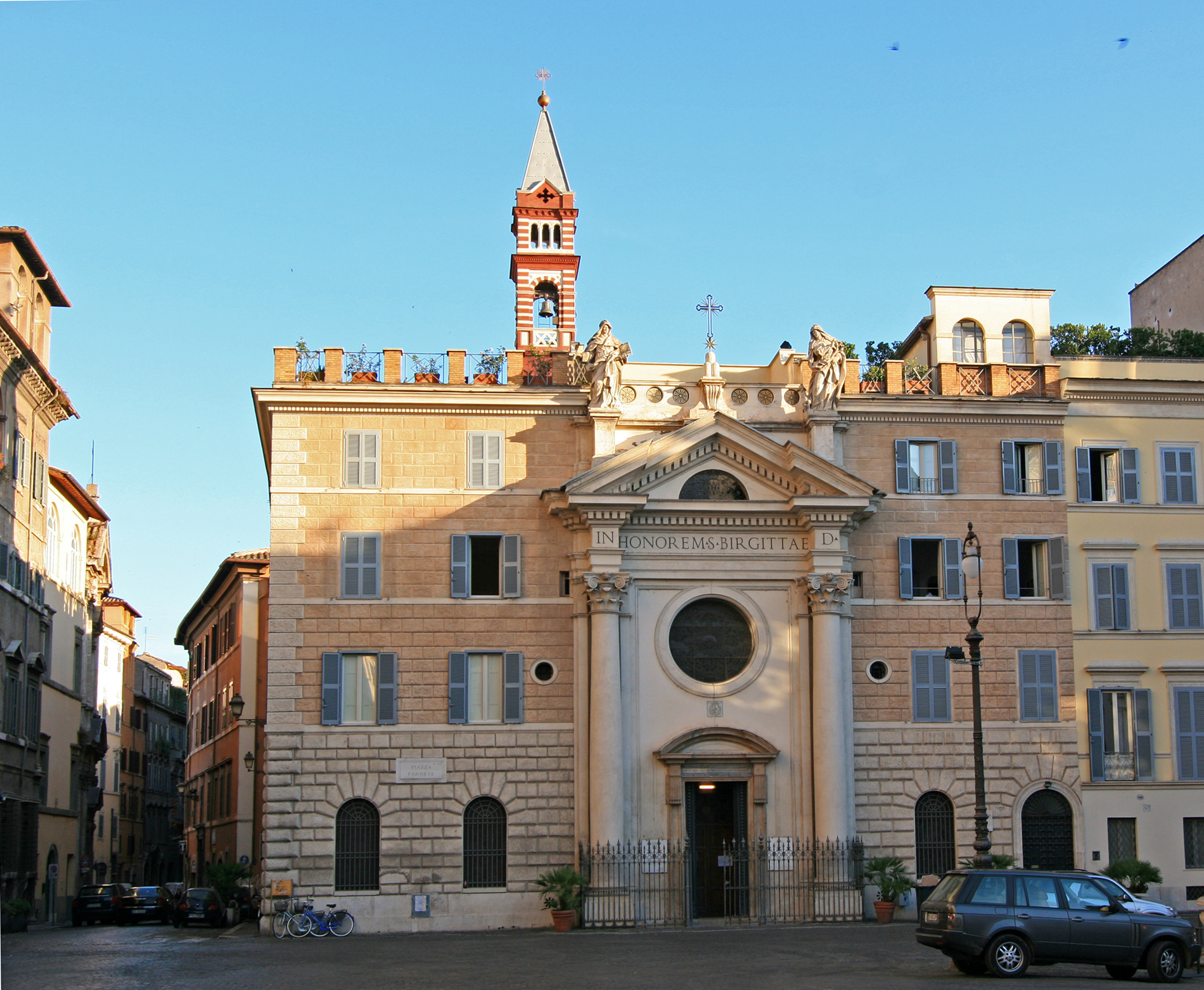
Santa Brigida a Campo de' Fiori, Rome

Among the works of Pietro Camporese the elder are:

- the completion of the façade of the church of Santa Maria in Aquiro (1774), built in the second order with stilemi resembling those of the 16th century church of Santa Maria dell'Orto in Rome;
- the completion of the façade of the German-Hungarian College, on via della Scrofa, Rome;
- an arch dedicated to pope Pius VI at Subiaco (1789);
- church of Sant'Andrea (cathedral) and Palazzo del Seminario (1766–1789) in Subiaco;
- church of Santa Brigida a Campo de' Fiori in Rome.

== Bibliography ==
- Fischer, Manfred F. (1974). "CAMPORESE, Pietro, il Vecchio". Dizionario Biografico degli Italiani (in Italian). Vol. 17: Calvart–Canefri. Rome: Istituto dell'Enciclopedia Italiana. ISBN 978-88-12-00032-6.
