= Basilica of Sant'Andrea, Subiaco =

Co-cathedral in Subiaco, Lazio, Italy

Coordinates: 41°55′25.6″N 13°5′46.8″E

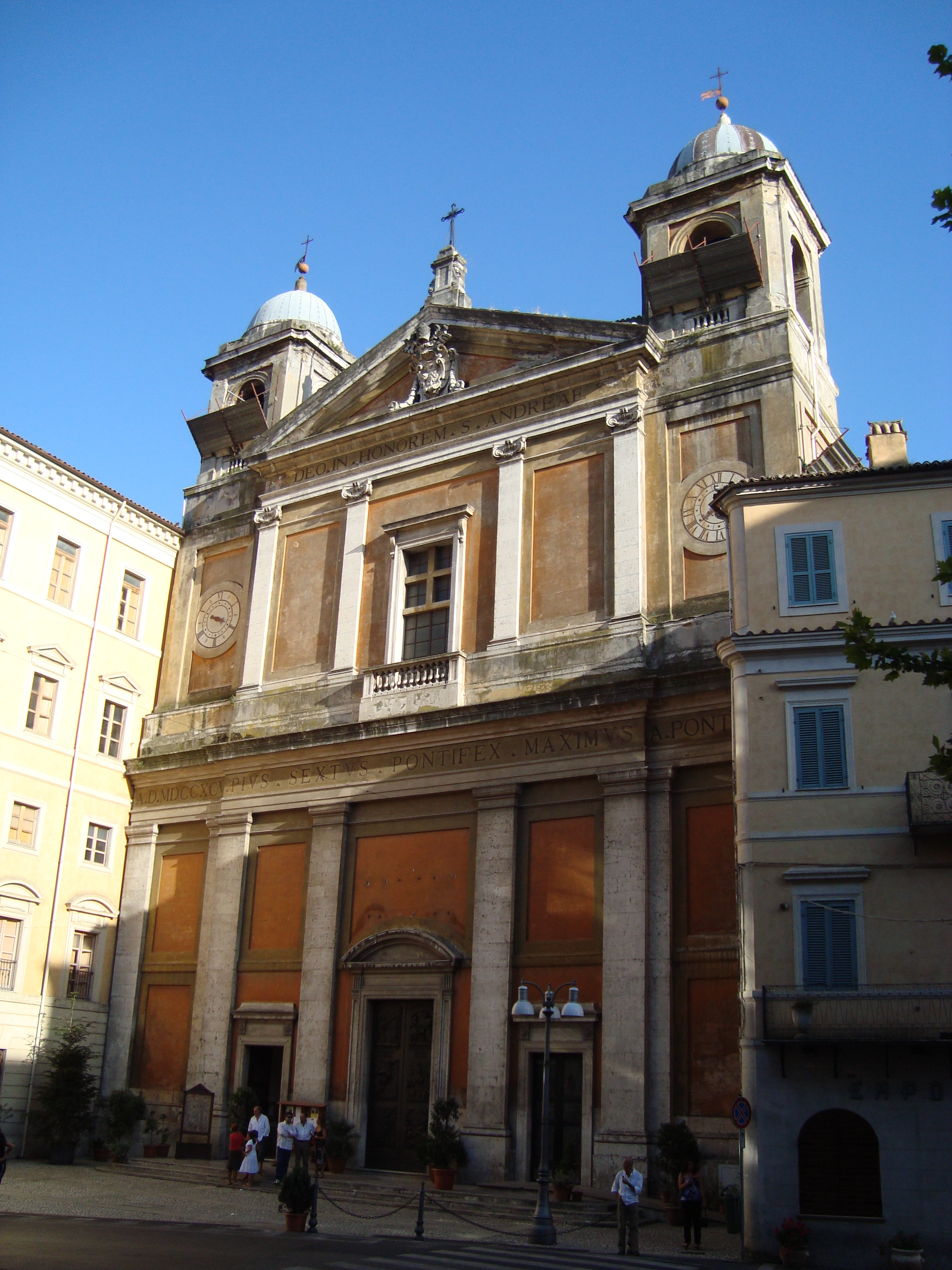
The facade of the church

The Basilica di Sant’Andrea Apostolo is an 18th-century, Neoclassical-style, Roman Catholic co-cathedral in the town of Subiaco, region of Lazio, Italy.

The church replaced an earlier church dedicated to Saint Abundius, and was consecrated by Pope Pius VI in 1789. The pope's coat of arms is depicted in the tympanum above the main portal. The frescoes in the prior church, completed by Manente and Caracci, were not preserved.

The church was nearly destroyed during World War II, and rebuilt as before in the 1950s.
