= Piazza Colonna =

Square in Rome, Italy

- City square
- {{{other_names}}}
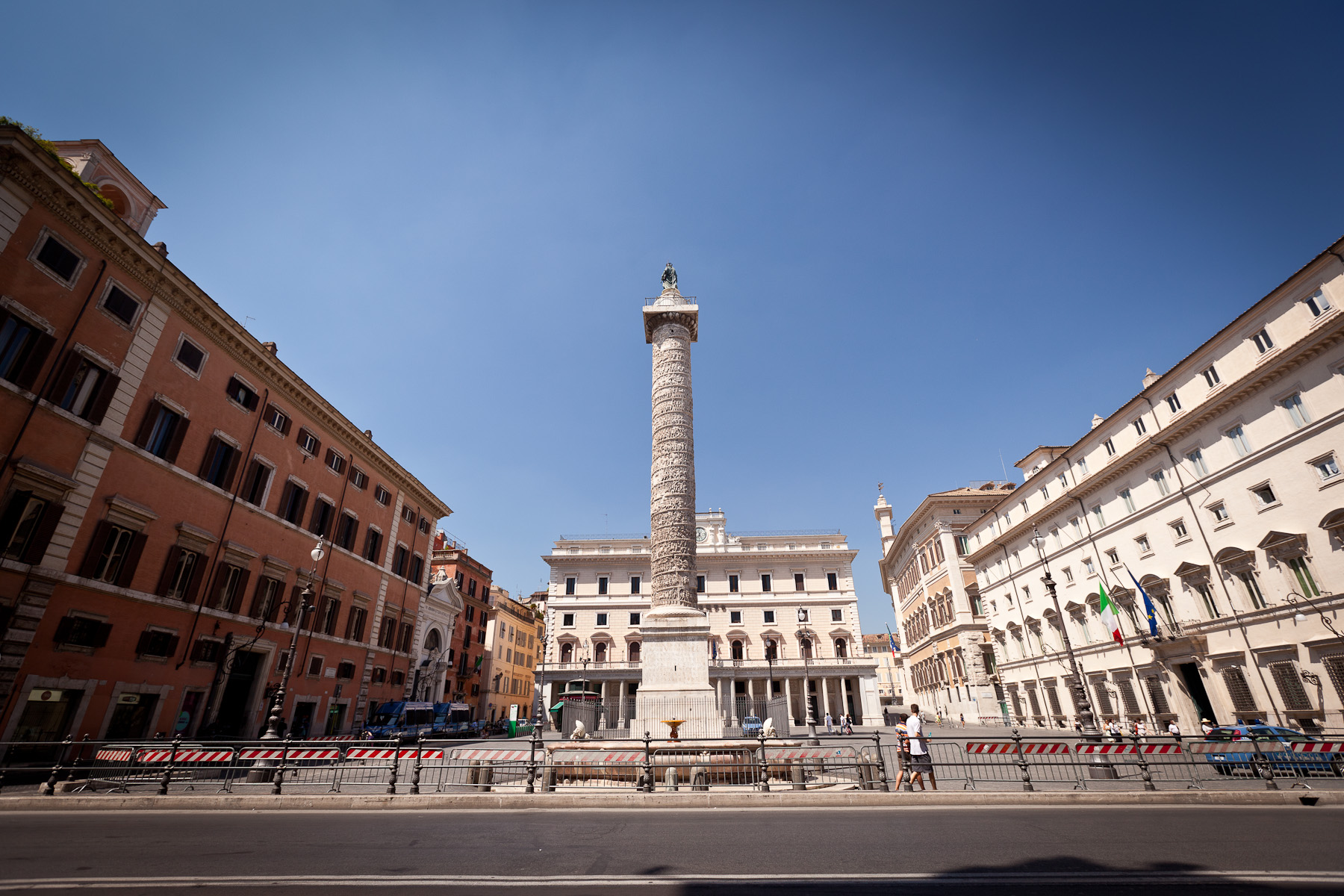
- Location: Rome, Italy
- Interactive map of Piazza Colonna
- Coordinates: 41°54′03.8″N 12°28′47.7″E

Piazza Colonna is a piazza at the center of the Rione of Colonna in the historic heart of Rome, Italy. It is named for the marble Column of Marcus Aurelius, which has stood there since AD 193. The bronze statue of Saint Paul that crowns the column was placed in 1589, by order of Pope Sixtus V. The Roman Via Lata (now the Via del Corso) runs through the piazza's eastern end, from south to north.

== Overview ==
The piazza is rectangular. Its north side is taken up by Palazzo Chigi, formerly the Austria-Hungary's embassy, but is now a seat of the Italian government. The east side is taken up by the 19th century public shopping arcade Galleria Colonna (since 2003 Galleria Alberto Sordi), the south side is taken up by the flank of Palazzo Ferrajoli, formerly the Papal post office, and the little Church of Santi Bartolomeo ed Alessandro dei Bergamaschi (1731-35). The west side is taken up by Palazzo Wedekind (1838) with a colonnade of Roman columns taken from Veii.

The piazza has been a monumental open space since Antiquity; the temple of Marcus Aurelius stood on the site of Palazzo Wedekind (TCI).

== Fountain ==
The fountain in the piazza (1577) was commissioned by Pope Gregory XIII from Giacomo Della Porta who was assisted by Rocco De Rossi. In 1830, it was restored and had two sets of dolphins side by side, with tails entwined, sculpted by Achille Stocchi, set at either end of the long basin. The central sculpture was then substituted with a smaller sculpture and spray.

Preceded by Clivus Capitolinus	Landmarks of Rome; Piazza Colonna	Succeeded by Piazza d'Aracoeli
