= Orazio Falconieri =

Italian nobleman

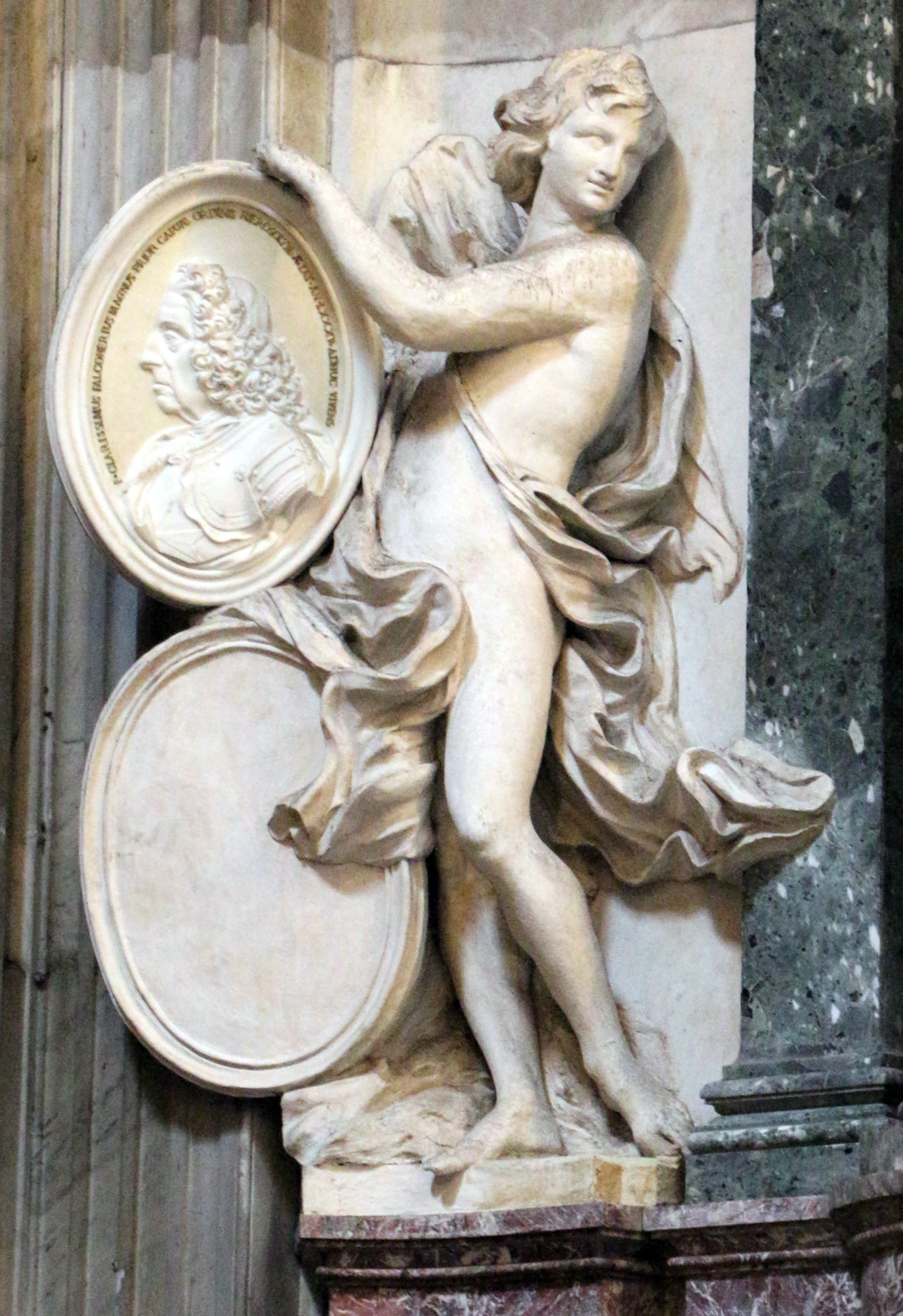
Orazio Falòconieri in his monument, by Domenico Guidi and Borromini

Orazio Paolo Falconieri (died 15–17 February 1664), also anglicized as Horace Paul Falconierus, was an Italian nobleman from Florence; he was the owner of the Palazzo Falconieri in Rome and of the Villa Falconieri in Frascati. His heraldic symbol was a falcon.

== Family ==
Falconieri was the son of Paolo Falconieri and Maddalena Albizzi and the brother of Lelio Falconieri who was later elevated to Cardinal.

In 1615 he married Ottavia Sacchetti (1590–1645), sister of Cardinal Giulio Cesare Sacchetti who would later consecrate Orazio's brother Lelio. The Sacchetti and Falconieri were already close; Orazio's father had made his fortune importing salt and as a result Orazio had business connections to Ottavia Sacchetti's father. When Ottavia's first husband, Piero Alberti, died, marriage to Orazio was considered an excellent option for both families. Records indicate they had at least one son (Paolo Francesco Falconieri) who took ownership of the Villa Falconieri and took his father's titles. Orazio's nephew was the diplomat and scientist Paolo Falconieri.

== Commissions ==
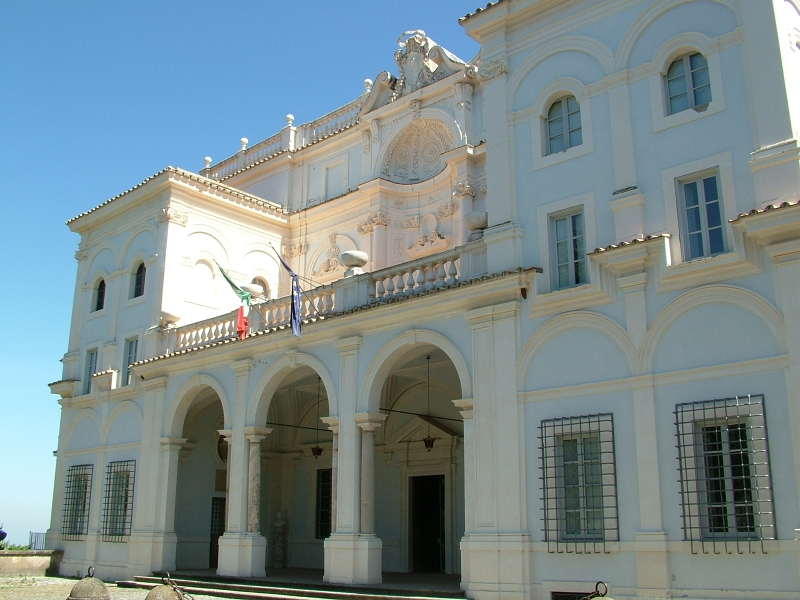
The Villa Falconieri in Frascati; renovations were commissioned by Orazio Falconieri

Falconieri purchased the Palazzo Falconieri on the Via Giulia and commissioned Francesco Borromini to renovate it. Borromini’s falcon-herms on the façade are a reference to the family’s heraldic bird; inside, many of the rooms are dominated by richly ornamented stucco ceilings, which give the impression of hovering domes that have temporarily alighted on the walls.

Orazio later commissioned Borromini to build a Falconieri family chapel for his burial and the burial of his brother Lelio Falconieri in the church of San Giovanni dei Fiorentini. Begun in temporary materials by Pietro da Cortona in 1634, the scheme was altered by Borromini between 1656 and 1664; it was finished by Ciro Ferri for Orazio’s son Paolo Francesco Falconieri in 1674. In the 1660s Orazio had the Villa Rufina at Frascati rebuilt and extended; although usually attributed to Borromini, the alterations bear none of the hallmarks of his style and are probably the work of Ferri.
