= Lelio Falconieri =

Catholic cardinal

- Cardinal-Priest of Santa Maria del Popolo
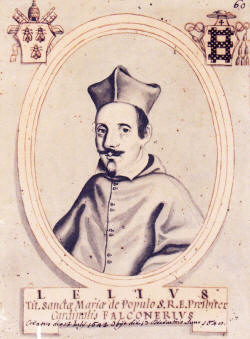
- Church: Catholic Church
- See: Santa Maria del Popolo
- In office: 31 August 1643 – 14 December 1648
- Predecessor: Lelio Biscia
- Successor: Mario Theodoli
- Other post: Secretary of the Congregation of Bishops and Regulars (1642-1648)
- Previous posts: Apostolic Nuncio to Flanders (1635-1637); Titular Archbishop of Thebae (1634-1643)

Orders
- Consecration: 10 December 1634 by Giulio Cesare Sacchetti
- Created cardinal: 13 July 1643 by Pope Urban VIII

Personal details
- Born: 1585 Florence, Grand Duchy of Tuscany
- Died: 14 December 1648 (aged 62–63) Viterbo, Papal States

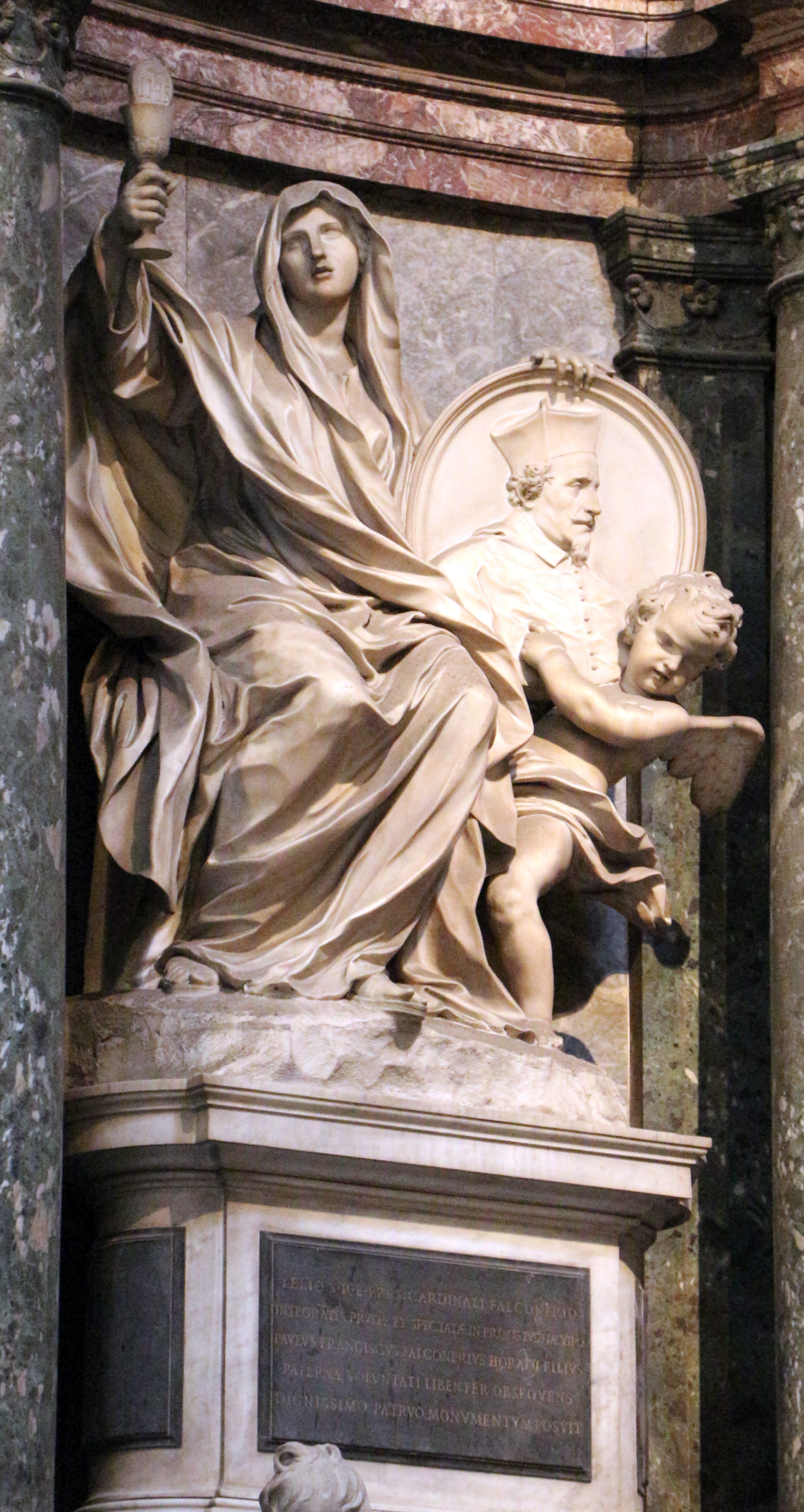
Monument to Cardinal Falconieri by Ercole Ferrata and Francesco Borromini in San Giovanni dei Fiorentini, Rome

Lelio Falconieri (1585 – 14 December 1648) was an Italian Catholic Cardinal.

== Family and early life ==
Falconieri was born in 1585 in Florence, the tenth of the thirteen children of Paolo Falconieri and his second wife Maddalena degli Albizzi. He was the brother of Don Orazio Falconieri who purchased the Villa Falconieri and commissioned Francesco Borromini to renovate it. Orazio later commissioned Borromini to renovate the church of San Giovanni dei Fiorentini to build a Falconieri family chapel for the burial of the two brothers. He studied law at the University of Perugia and went on to take a doctorate in canon and civil law from the University of Pisa.

At a young age, he went to Rome and became an advocate at the Roman Curia and papal prelate during the pontificate of Pope Paul V. In 1619, he became Governor of San Severino and a referendary of the Tribunals of the Apostolic Signatura of Justice and of Grace. He became Governor of Spoleto (1621), Vice-governor of Benevento (1622) and Governor of the Campagne and Maritime Province (1622).

== Pontificate of Urban VIII ==
Maffeo Barberini was elected Pope Urban VIII at the Papal conclave of 1623 and during his pontificate, Falconieri became the relator of the Sacred Consulta and commissary general of Umbria and Romagna.

In 1634, he was elected Titular Archbishop of Tebe and was consecrated on 10 December of that year at the church of San Giovanni dei Fiorentini by Cardinal Giulio Cesare Sacchetti, brother of his sister-in-law Ottavia Sacchetti. Between 1635 and 1637, he was named papal nuncio to Flanders, but after being informed in Liège that the government of Philip IV of Spain opposed his appointment, he returned to Rome on grounds of ill health. He was replaced by an acting nuncio, Richard Pauli-Stravius.

Pope Urban elevated Falconieri to cardinal in the consistory of 1643 and he was named Cardinal-Priest of Santa Maria del Popolo later that year.

== Later life ==
Falconieri participated in the Papal conclave of 1644, which elected Pope Urban's successor, Pope Innocent X.

Pope Innocent made him Legate in Bologna but after suffering a very serious illness in Florence Falconieri decided to return to Rome. He died on the way at Viterbo on 14 December 1648 and was buried in the church of San Giovanni dei Fiorentini.

Catholic Church titles
Preceded by Giuseppe Acquaviva	Titular Bishop of Tebe; 1634–1648	Succeeded by Annibale Bentivoglio
Preceded by Fabio Lagonissa	Papal nuncio to Flanders; 1635–1637	Succeeded by Richard Pauli-Stravius (acting)
