= Villa Falconieri =

Villa in Frascati, Italy

Coordinates: 41°48′26″N 12°41′22″E

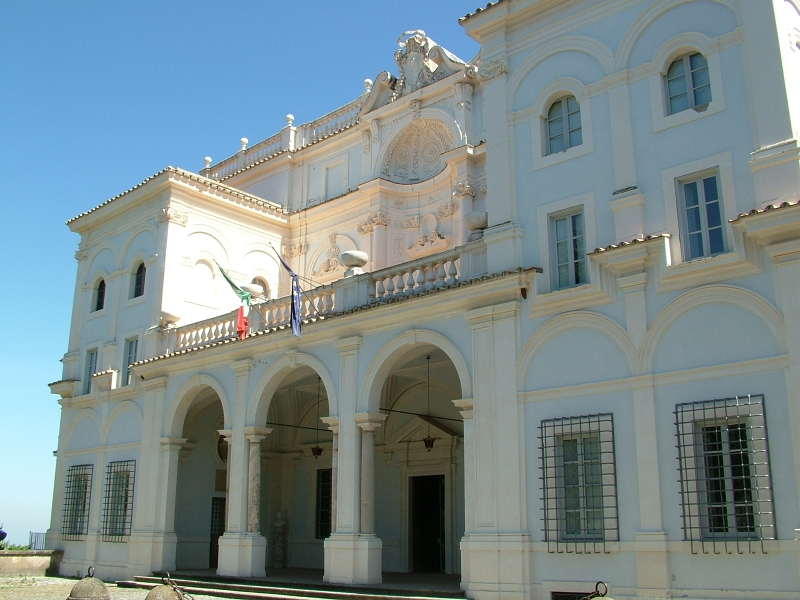
Villa Falconieri.

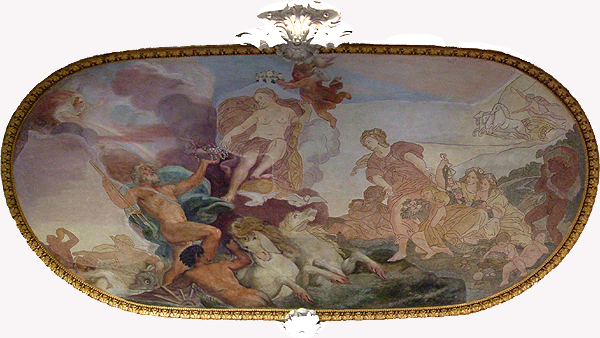
The Birth of Venus.

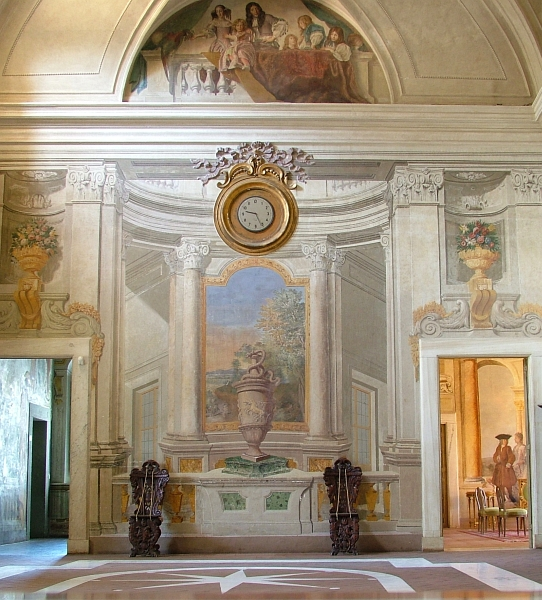
Entrance Hall.

The Villa Falconieri is a villa in Frascati, Italy.

== History ==
The villa was originally called Villa Rufina, having been was initially built by Monsignor Alessandro Rufini. Later it was enlarged thanks to Pope Paul III, dating back to 1546. In 1628 Orazio Falconieri purchased the villa and commissioned Francesco Borromini to oversee its renovation. His aim was for him and his brother, Cardinal Lelio Falconieri, to be buried there

Important architects worked on the design such as Antonio da Sangallo the Younger and Borromini. The interior houses frescoes by Pier Leone Ghezzi, Giacinto Calandrucci, Ciro Ferri, Niccolò Berrettoni, and others. The park is a splendid Italian garden enlarged in the 17th century, with a small lake bordered by cypresses created in the 18th century.

== Modern history ==
The German writer Richard Voss lived here for 25 years and wrote several novels as Villa Falconieri, Roman Fever, The Son of Volsca and others; he called the Villa as "my shining house". For this reason, Villa Falconieri was always dear to the German community of Rome.

In 1905, the Villa was bought by the German banker Ernst von Mendelssohn-Bartholdy of Berlin, a nephew of the composer Felix Mendelssohn Bartholdy. In 1907, he gave it as a gift to emperor Wilhelm II. On April 6, 1911 the Crown Prince William and Princess Cecilie visited the villa and decided on some restorations.

In 1921, the Villa was expropriated by Italian State. Villa Falconieri was damaged by US bombing during World War II while being used as the headquarters of Field Marshal Albert Kesselring, but masterly work restored its previous splendor.

== Modern use ==
Since 2016, Villa Falconieri has been the headquarters of the Accademia Vivarium Novum Latin academy, a cultural center of excellence that has entrusted the decoration of its rooms to an appreciated re-adaptation of classical symbolism, giving the Villa Falconieri an iconographic experience linked to the international vocation of this world campus of Humanism.

Summer Room.
