= Collegium Hungaricum =

Collegium Hungaricum may refer to ...

- Balassi Institute (Collegium Hungaricum), organization supporting Hungarian education and culture around the world
- Collegium Germanicum et Hungaricum (Catholic priest's seminary in Rome, Italy).
