= Giovanni Marciani (composer) =

Giovanni Marciani (c. 1605 – c. 1663) was an Italian composer, singer, and organist. He lived his entire life in Rome. Beginning in 1616 He was educated at the Collegium Germanicum et Hungaricum where he was also trained as a singer. After completing his studies, he worked as a paid tenor at that same institution under Giacomo Carissimi. He simultaneously worked as a court musician to the Prince of Gallicano from 1645 through 1653; maestro di cappella at the San Giovanni dei Fiorentini (1645–1659); and was the organist at the San Luigi dei Francesi from 1649 through 1653. He mainly a composer of madrigals, motets, and cantatas; many of which are contained in music anthologies published in Rome between the years 1645 and 1663. His compositional style was heavily influenced by Carissimi with whom he worked for many years and with whom he may have either studied or been advised in composition.
