= Palazzo Falconieri =

Palace in Rome, Italy

Coordinates: 41.8948°N 12.4694°E

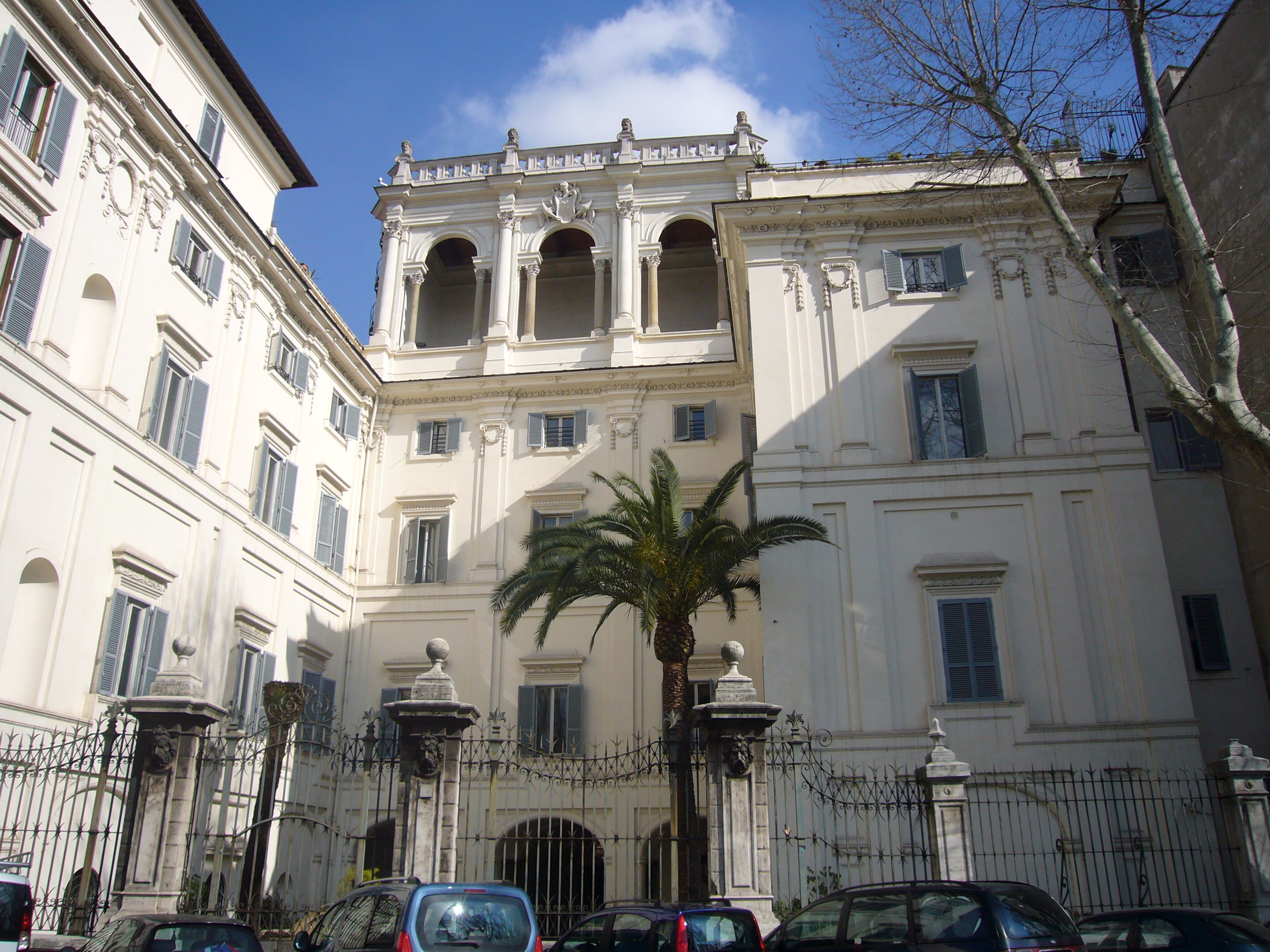
- Borromini facade facing the Tiber
- Interactive map of Palazzo Falconieri

General information
- Architectural style: Renaissance
- Location: Rome, Italy

Design and construction
- Architect: Francesco Borromini

The Palazzo Falconieri is a palace in Rome, Italy formed in the seventeenth century as a result of remodelling by the Baroque architect Francesco Borromini. It is the home of the Hungarian Academy Rome (which is the Rome office of the Balassi Institute), since its foundation in 1927. It is located between Via Giulia and Lungotevere, with entrances to both; it is near Palazzo Farnese and a few houses down and across Via Giulia from the church of Santa Caterina della Rota in the Rione of Regola. From 1814, it was occupied by cardinal Joseph Fesch, Napoleon's uncle.

In 1638, Orazio Falconieri purchased a palace on the Via Giulia which had a small courtyard facing the River Tiber. He bought an adjacent property in 1645 and in 1646 and appointed the architect Francesco Borromini to remodel and refurbish the two. Some of Borromini’s work was lost in the nineteenth century development of Lungotevere, the embankment and road between the Tiber and the buildings which overlook it, but parts remain.

The surviving parts of Borromini’s work include the façade to the Via Giulia, the Belvedere overlooking the Tiber and the decorative work in several rooms. On the façade, the number of bays was increased from seven to eleven and at either end, tall inverted fluted pilasters were placed terminating in falcons heads, a reference to the family name, that each look back at the façade. Overlooking the Tiber, Borromini added a Belvedere, a three bay loggia with Serliana openings, that stands above the surrounding buildings. On the interior, some of the rooms are ornamented with stucco work designed by Borromini, with the frequent use of heraldic devices and symbolic motifs.
