= Sant'Ivo alla Sapienza =

Church of Saint Ivo at La Sapienza
- Chiesa di Sant'Ivo alla Sapienza
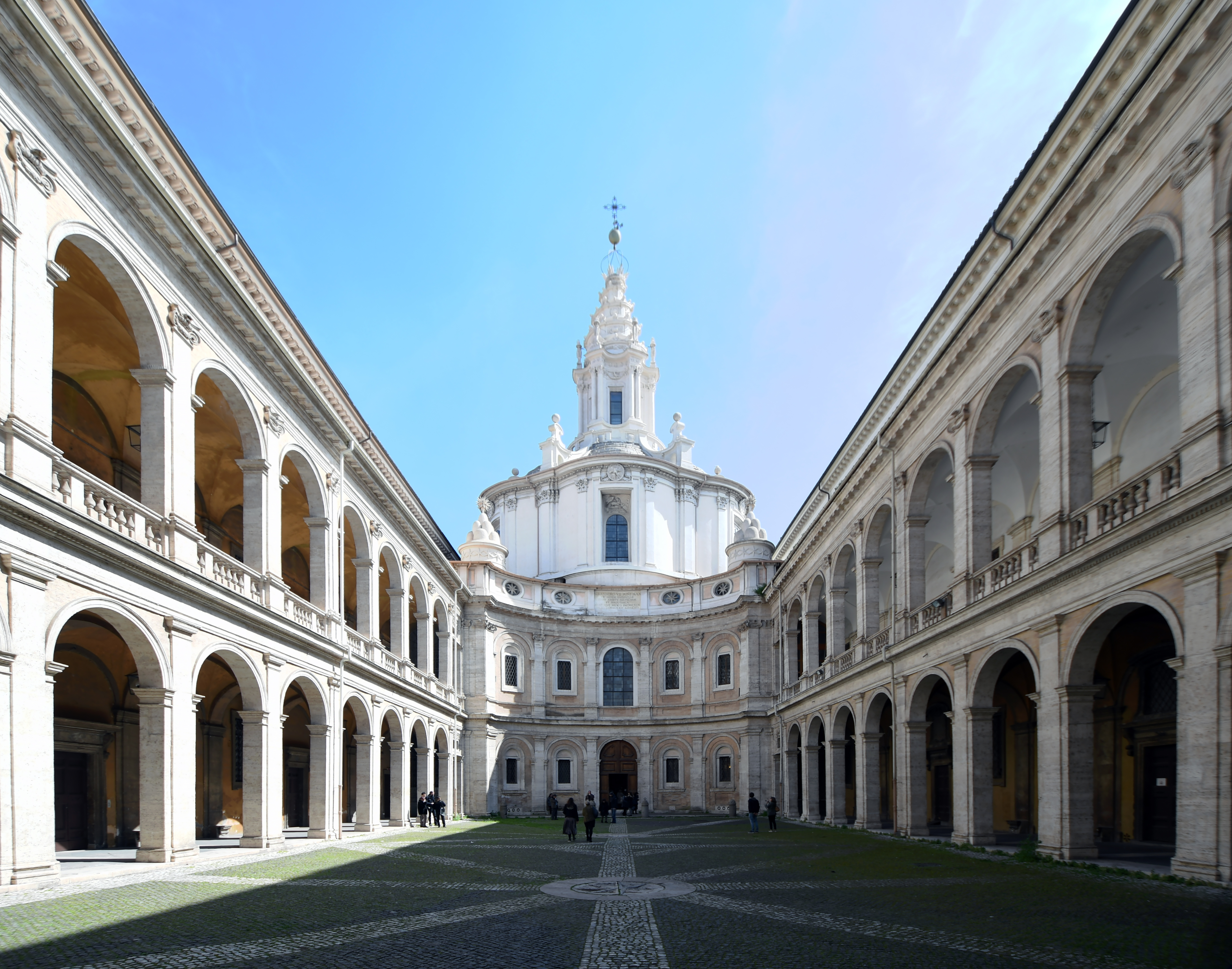
- Sant'Ivo, embraced by the wings of the Palazzo alla Sapienza
- Click on the map to see marker.
- 41°53′54″N 12°28′29″E
- Location: Corso del Rinascimento, Rome
- Country: Italy
- Denomination: Catholic
- Tradition: Roman Rite
- Website: Official website

History
- Status: Rectory Church
- Consecrated: 1660

Architecture
- Architect: Francesco Borromini.
- Style: Baroque
- Groundbreaking: 1642
- Completed: 1660

Specifications
- Length: 27 metres (89 ft)
- Width: 26 metres (85 ft)

Sant'Ivo alla Sapienza (lit. 'Saint Ivo at the Sapienza (University of Rome)') is a Catholic church in Rome. Built in 1642–1660 by the architect Francesco Borromini, the church is widely regarded a masterpiece of Roman Baroque architecture.

The church is at the rear of a courtyard at 40, Corso del Rinascimento; the complex is now used by the State Archives of Rome.

== History ==
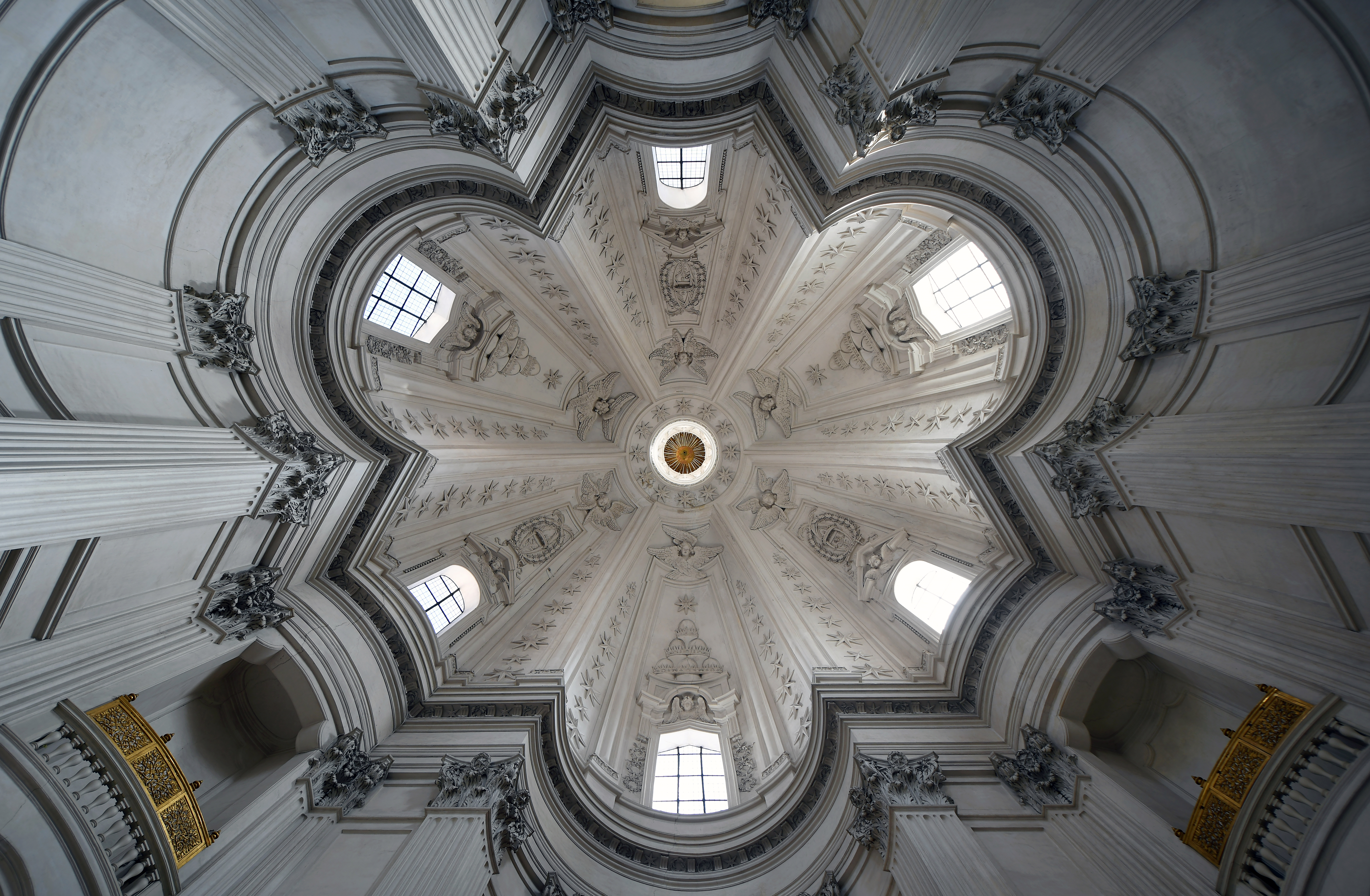
Interior view.

In the 14th century, there was a chapel here for the palace of the University of Rome. The University is called La Sapienza, and the church was dedicated to Saint Ivo (or Yves, patron saint of jurists). When a design was commissioned from Borromini in the 17th century, he adapted to the already existing palazzo. He chose a plan resembling a star of David – which would have been recognized at the time as a Star of Solomon, symbolizing wisdom – and merged a curved facade of the church with the courtyard of the palace. The corkscrew lantern of the dome was novel. The complex rhythms of the interior have a dazzling geometry to them.

== Exterior ==
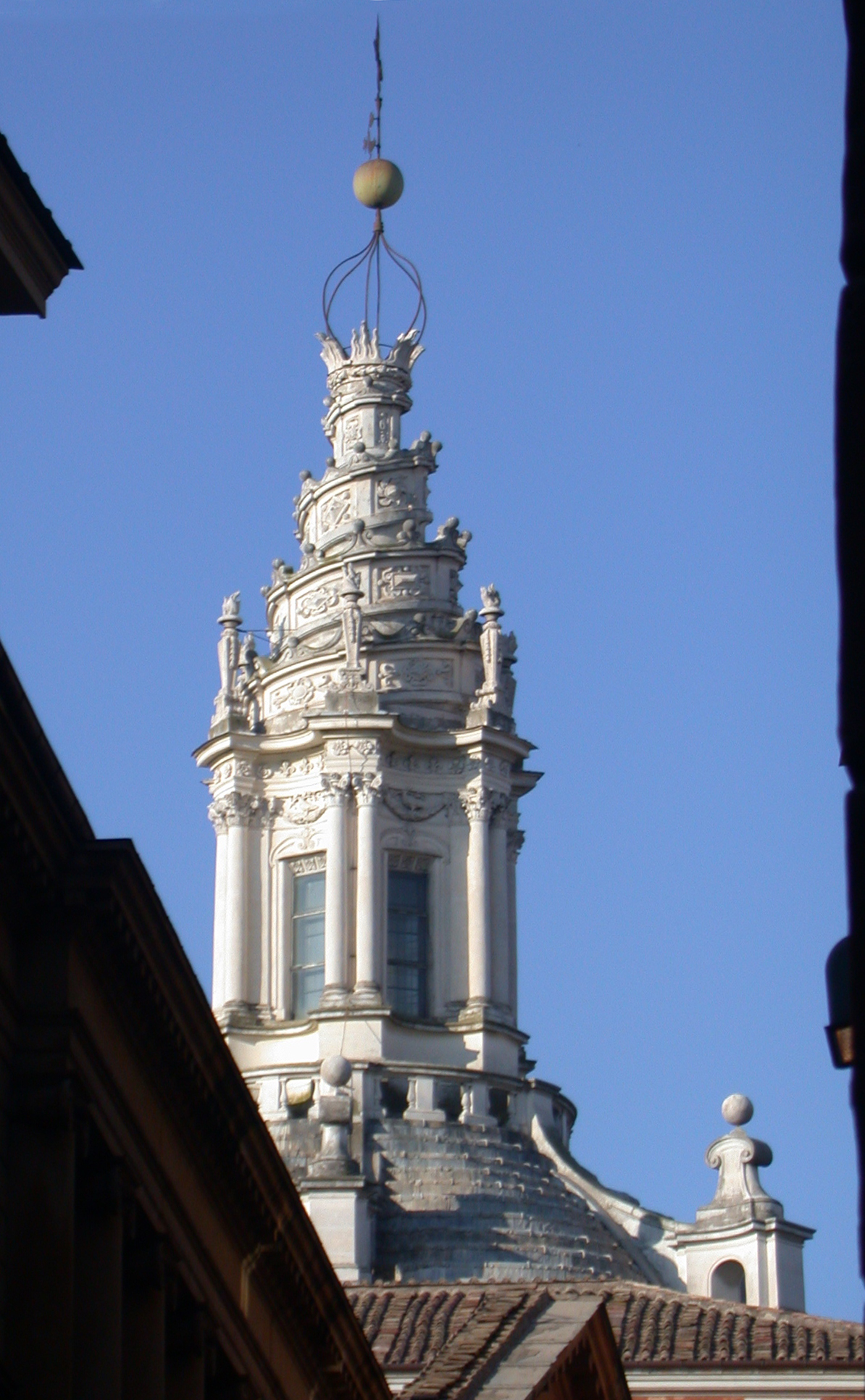
The lantern.

The church rises at the end of a courtyard, known as the courtyard of Giacomo della Porta. The façade is concave, molding the church into the courtyard as if completing it rather than disrupting it. The façade itself looks like a continuation of the courtyard arches except with the openings filled in with small windows, a door, and a larger glass window above the door. Above the façade is a large parapet structure so that only the higher stages of the church is seen past the façade. A key exterior aspect is the top of the church: the lantern of Sant'Ivo is topped with a spiral shape, surmounted by a Cross.

== Interior ==
Floor scheme.

The interior of Sant'Ivo is unique because of the shapes incorporated into the rotunda. Borromini was well known for fusing of geometrical shapes as well as his pairing of columns in order to facilitate curves, incorporating them in a harmonious manner in his project at San Carlino. But for Sant'Ivo, Borromini did not blend the different shapes. The rotunda of Sant'Ivo is contrived of distinct shapes, a triangle with its three angles cut as if bitten off, and semi-circles located in between the triangle's three lines. Despite the shift from the smooth geometrical alignments of San Carlino to the sharper abrupt geometrical bends in Sant'Ivo, both buildings exhibit harmony between the sharp edges and the curves and spheres. Borromini utilized curves (semi-circles) and edges (clipped triangle tips) in equal amounts to define the shape of the rotunda. This blending of edges and curves is arguably Borromini's most distinguishable signature.

Another detail is that windows associated with the round sections of the dome are larger than those associated with the edges. One of the edgy sections is where the entrance is located while the altar is located on the opposite end, a round section. The two other round and edgy sections to the sides are identical in features . Through the perforations in the lantern, sunlight illuminates the dome through an oculus. Francesco Borromini had a talisman with the shape of a flying bee installed in the roof of the lantern as this is a symbol of the family of Urban VIII Barberini who patronized the construction of Sant'Ivo.

The aisles of arches surrounding the right and left wings of the bird or of Sant'Ivo are themselves not halted by the church. Here, the space between the arches and the walls in the aisles still continues past the church's sides. Each aisle has a single lateral entrance to the church. These hindered side entrances lead to hexagonal rooms (one on each side), and these hexagonal rooms are connected to the rotunda as well as the smaller façade windows. Behind the Altar to the rear of the church lies two more hexagonal rooms with windows aligned on the back. To the rear wings of the altar are the passages leading to the two separate hexagonal rear rooms.

The inside walls and dome of the rotunda were covered by Borromini with sculptures and motifs. On each edgy and round section there are columns of stars leading up to an angel's face with wings. One close observable difference between the round segments and the edgy ones is that the round ones exhibit a motif of a stylised mountain of six parts surmounted by a star (the Chigi coat of arms) which is also represented in sculptural form either side of the facade. while the edgy segments exhibit a bouquet of flowers held together by a single crown.

The main altar was designed by Giovanni Battista Contini in 1684, and is surmounted by a large canvas, Ss. Ivo, Leone, Pantaleone, Luca, e Caterina d'Allessandria in gloria di angeli, started by Pietro da Cortona (1661), and completed by Giovanni Ventura Borghesi after Cortona's death.

== Influence ==
The corkscrew lantern of the church is the direct inspiration for the also spiralling spire of Vor Frelsers Kirke in Copenhagen, Denmark.

== See also ==
- 17th-century Western domes
