= San Giovanni dei Fiorentini =

- Basilica di San Giovanni Battista dei Fiorentini
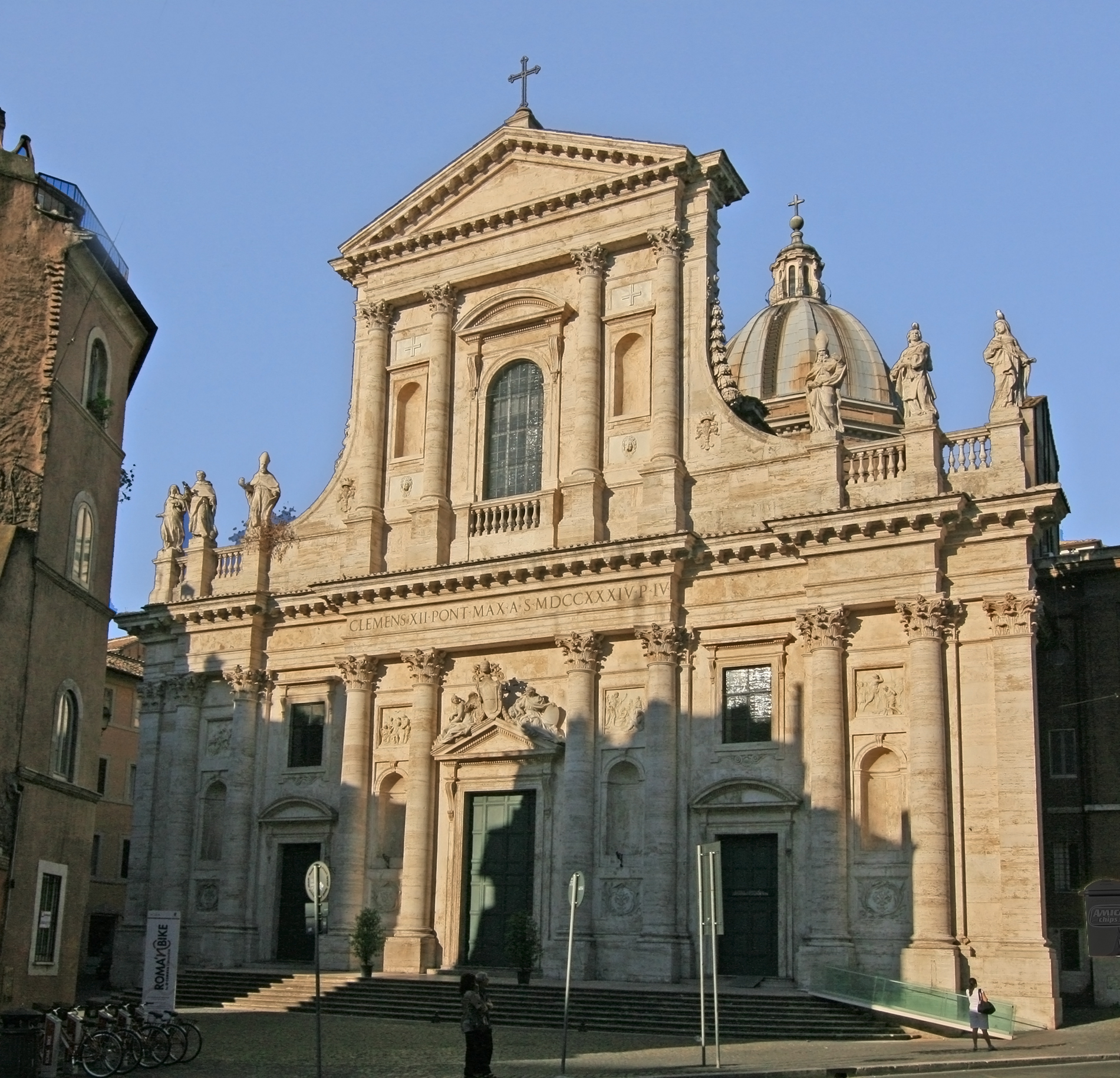
- The façade of San Giovanni
- Click on the map for a fullscreen view
- 41°53′59″N 12°27′54″E
- Location: Rome
- Country: Italy
- Denomination: Catholic Church
- Tradition: Latin Church
- Website: sangiovannibattistadeifiorentini.it

History
- Status: minor basilica titular church regional church

Architecture
- Architect(s): Giacomo della Porta; Jacopo Sansovino
- Architectural type: Church
- Style: Baroque
- Groundbreaking: 1523
- Completed: 1734

The Basilica of San Giovanni dei Fiorentini ("Saint John of the Florentines") is a minor basilica and a titular church in the Ponte rione of Rome, Italy.

Dedicated to St. John the Baptist, the protector of Florence, the new church for the Florentine community in Rome was started in the 16th century and completed in the early 18th, and is the national church of Florence in Rome.

It was lavishly decorated with art over the 16th and 17th centuries, with most commissions going to Florentine artists.

== History ==
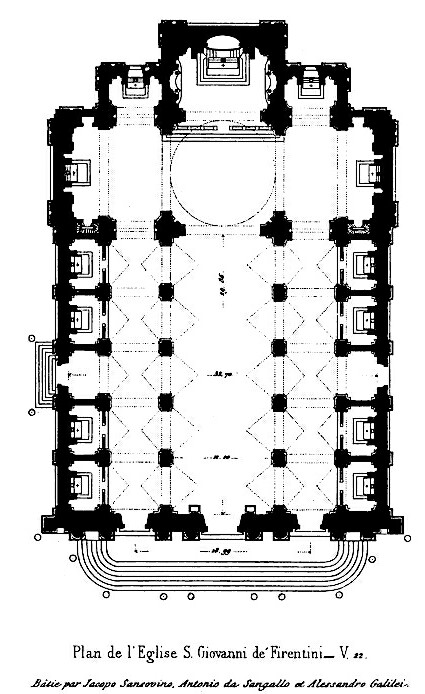
Plan of the Church

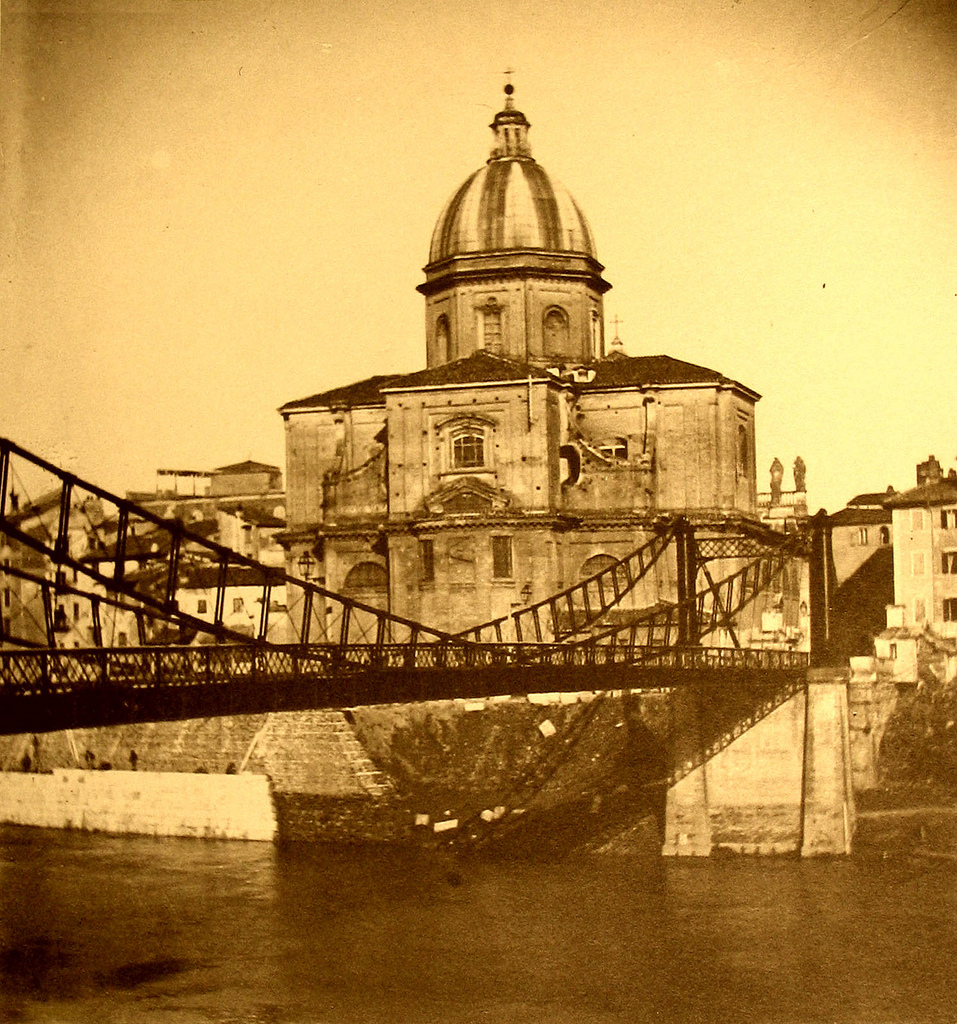
Iron bridge at San Giovanni dei Fiorentini, ca. 1890. The bridge was built in 1827 and demolished in 1941. Photo by Giuseppe Primoli.

Julius II's successor, the Florentine Pope Leo X de' Medici (1513-1521), initiated the architectural competition for a new church in 1518 on the site of the old church of San Pantaleo. Designs were put forward by a number of architects, among them Baldassare Peruzzi, Jacopo Sansovino, Antonio da Sangallo the Younger and the painter and architect Raphael. The dominant initial ideas were for a centralised church arrangement.

Sansovino won the competition but the building construction was subsequently executed by Sangallo and Giacomo della Porta.

In 1559, Michelangelo was asked by Cosimo I de' Medici, Duke of Tuscany, to prepare designs for the church and he presented a centralised church arrangement but this was not adopted.

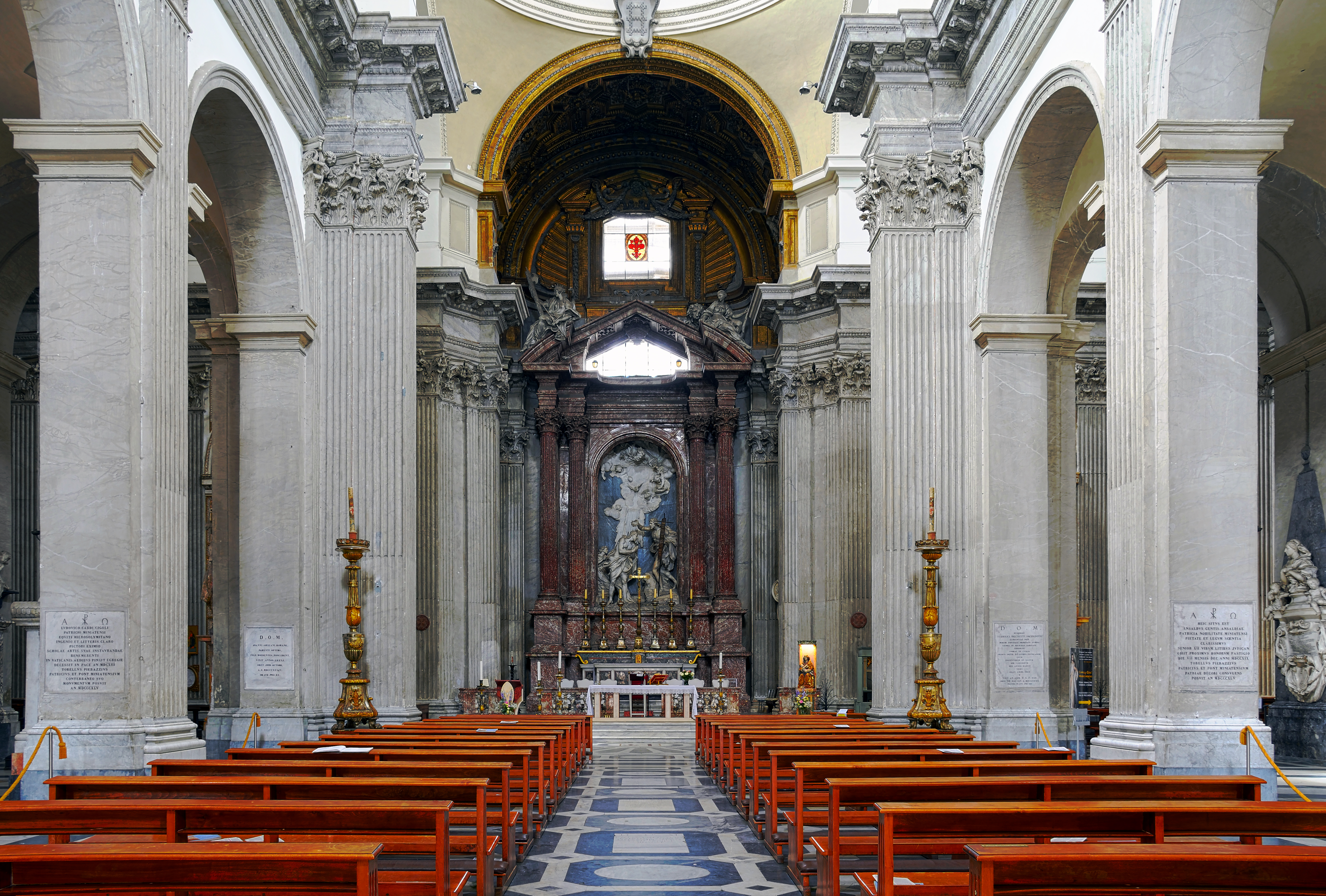
The nave.

The main construction of the church was carried out in 1583-1602 under the architect Giacomo della Porta based on the Latin cross arrangement. Carlo Maderno took over from 1602 to 1620, and directed construction of the dome and the main body of the church. However, the façade, based on a design by Alessandro Galilei, was not finished until 1734.

In 1623-24 Giovanni Lanfranco produced paintings for the Sacchetti chapel.

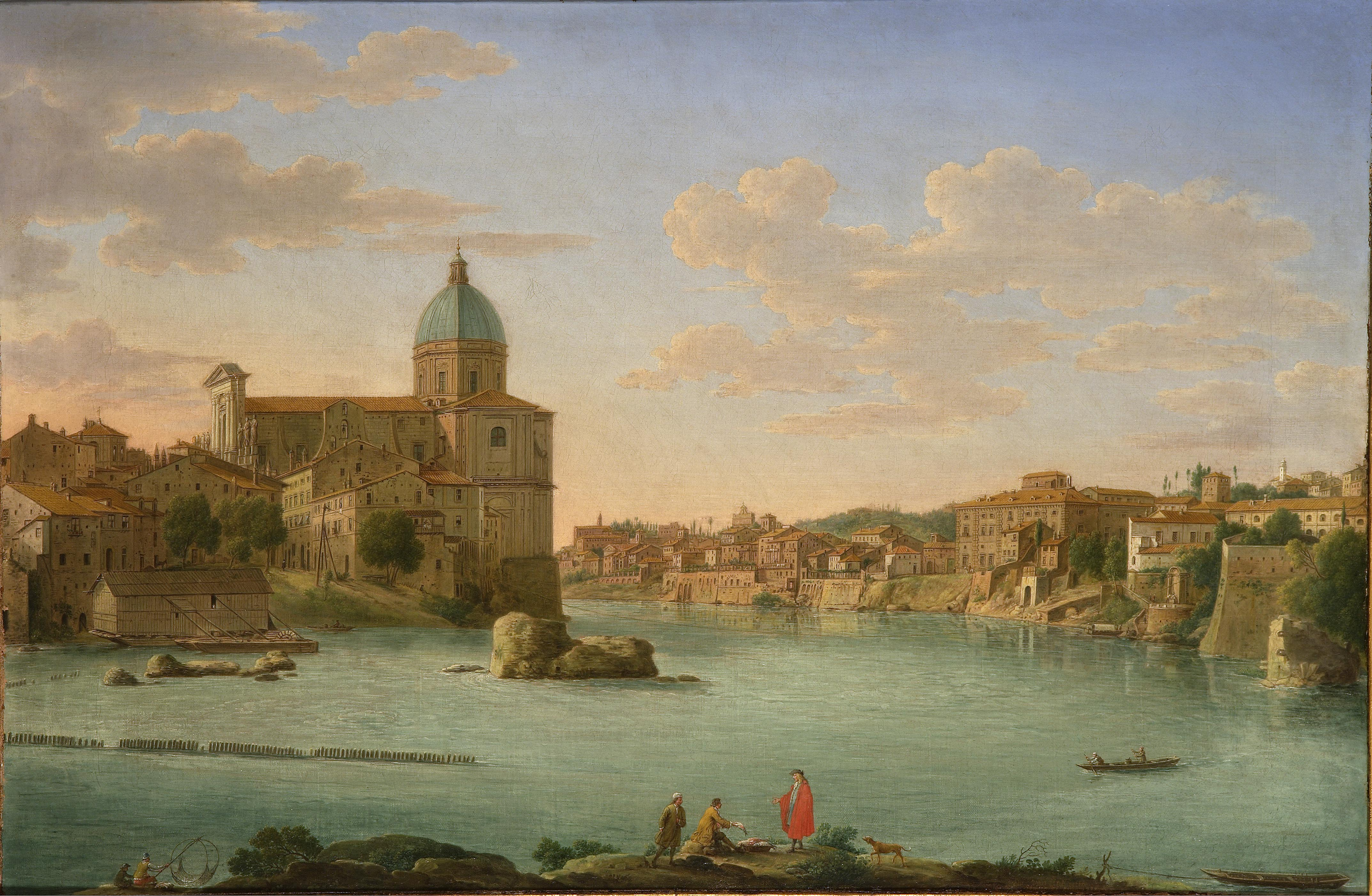
San Giovanni dei Fiorentini painted in 1739 by Hendrik Frans van Lint.

In 1634, the Baroque painter and architect Pietro da Cortona was asked by the Florentine nobleman Orazio Falconieri to design the high altar. Drawings for the altar and its setting and a model were prepared but the project was not carried out. Cortona's ideas for the choir included windows hidden from the view of the congregation that would illuminate the altarpiece, an early example of the Baroque usage of a "hidden light" source, a concept which would be much employed by Bernini. Some twenty to thirty years later, Falconieri resurrected the choir project but gave the commission to the Baroque architect Francesco Borromini, who changed the design to allow for the burial of Orazio's brother, Cardinal Lelio Falconieri. After Borromini's death in 1667, the work was completed and partly modified by Cortona and, on his death in 1669, by Ciro Ferri, Cortona's pupil and associate.

== Notable people ==
=== Cardinal-Priests ===
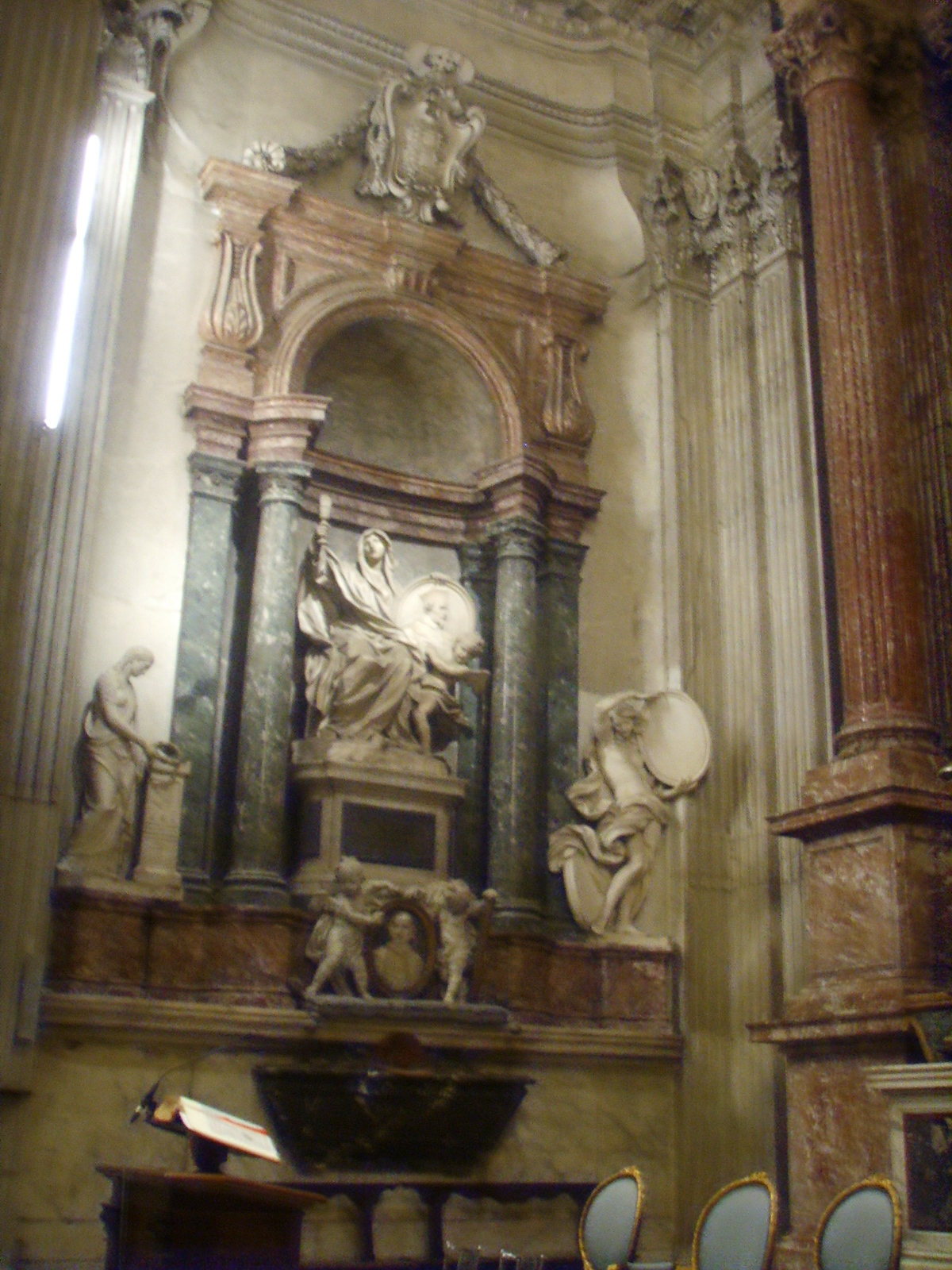
Left side wall of the choir or Falconieri Chapel.

- Joseph-Charles Lefèbvre (appointed 28 March 1960 - died 2 April 1973)
- Juan Carlos Aramburu (appointed 24 May 1976 - died 18 November 2004)
- Carlo Caffarra (appointed 24 March 2006 - died 6 September 2017)
- Giuseppe Petrocchi (appointed 28 June 2018)

=== Musicians ===
- Giovanni Marciani, maestro di cappella from 1645-1659

== Burials ==
Francesco Borromini is buried under the dome.

Carlo Murena, architect

Carlo Maderno, architect

== Relics ==
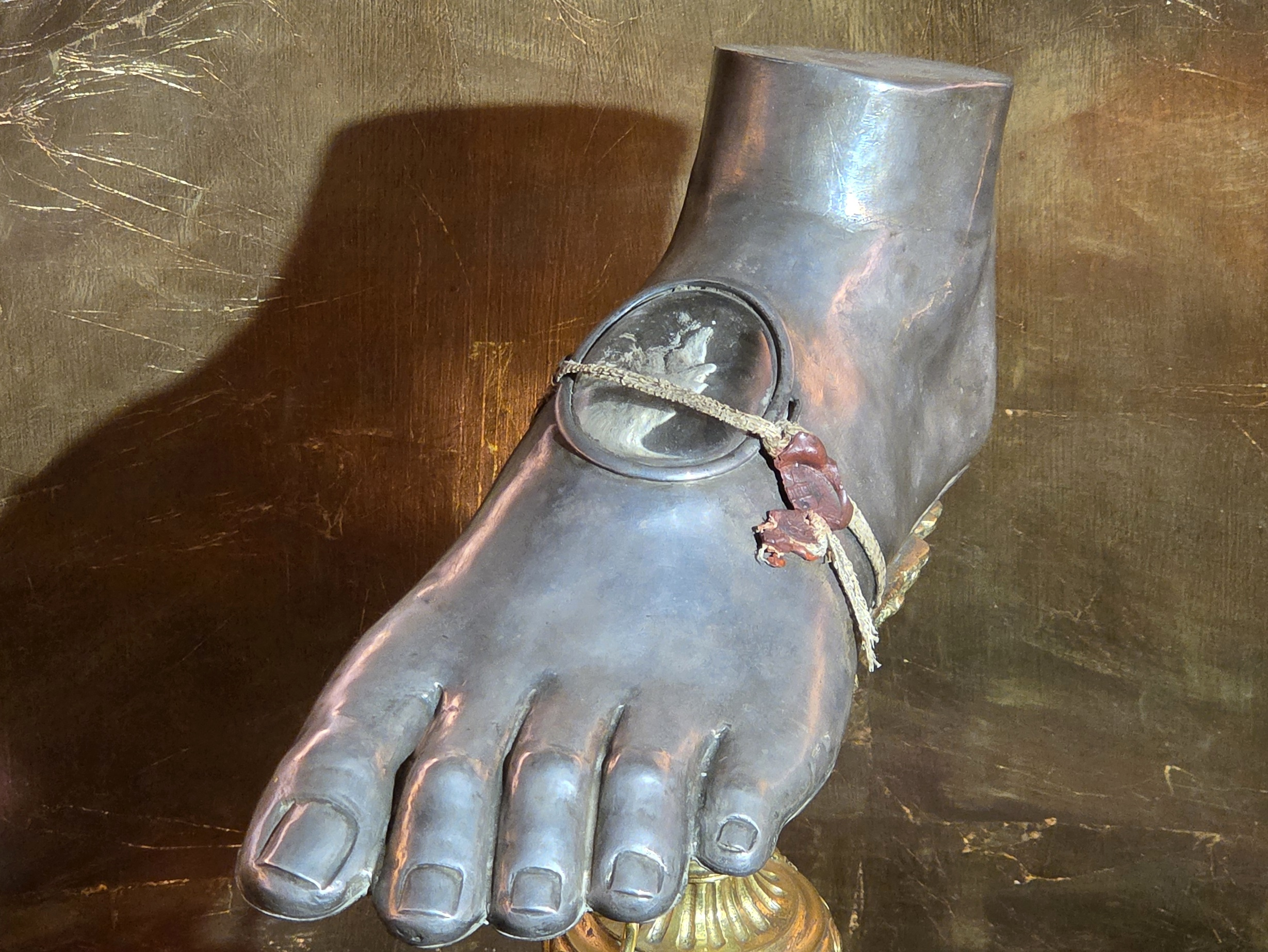
Relic of the left foot of St. Mary Magdalene, exhibited for the devotion of the faithful.

The church contains the relic of the left foot of St. Mary Magdalene.

== See also ==
- 17th-century Western domes

Preceded by San Giovanni a Porta Latina	Landmarks of Rome; San Giovanni dei Fiorentini	Succeeded by Santi Giovanni e Paolo al Celio
