= Balassi Institute =

Parent organization of Hungary's cultural institutions abroad

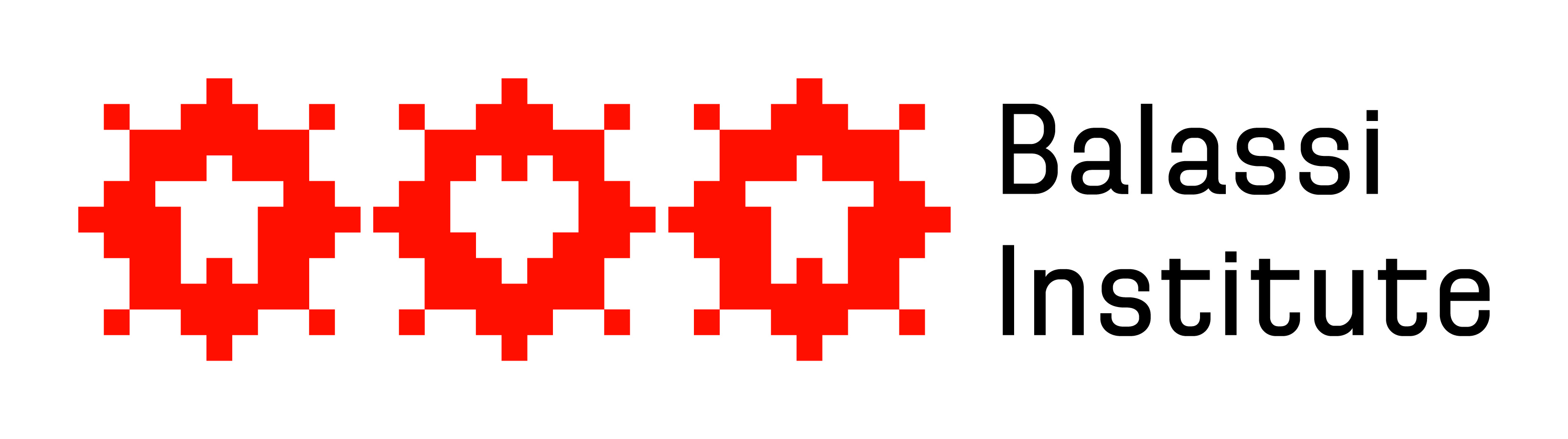

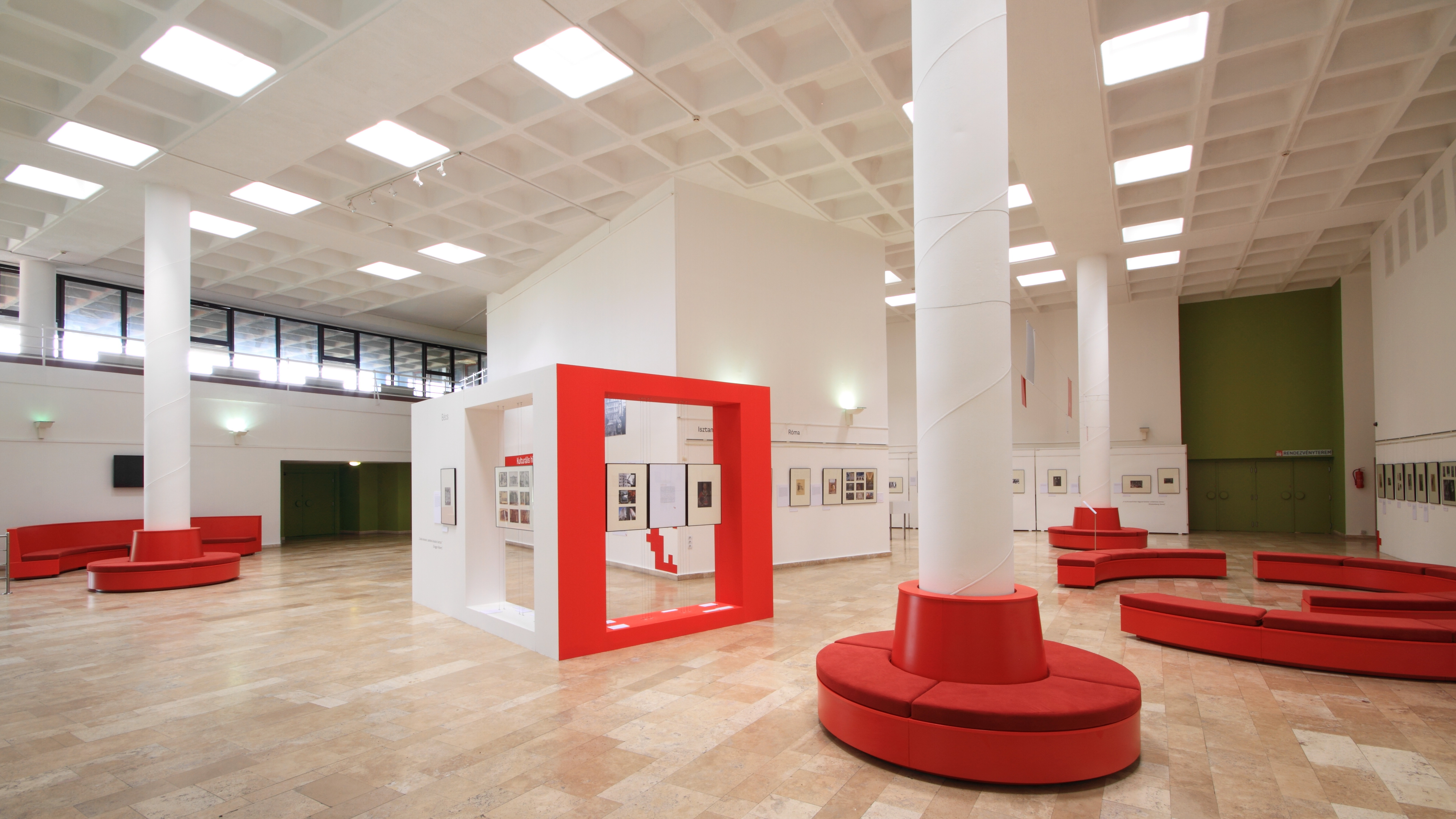
- Balassi Institute headquarters in Budapest
- Founded: 1927; 99 years ago
- Founder: Government of Hungary
- Type: Cultural institution
- Location(s): Somlói út 51. 1016 Budapest
- Region served: Worldwide (21 countries)
- Product: Hungarian cultural and language education
- Key people: Judit Hammerstein
- Employees: 266
- Website: www.balassiintezet.hu

The Balassi Institute (Hungarian: Balassi Intézet) is a worldwide non-profit cultural organization funded by the Ministry of Foreign Affairs (Külügyminisztérium) of Hungary. The institute spreads and promotes Hungarian language and culture abroad, and plays a key role in developing and attaining Hungary's objectives in the area of cultural diplomacy. As an organizational hub, it coordinates and directs all activities provided by Hungarian institutes abroad.
It is named after the Hungarian Renaissance lyric poet Bálint Balassi.

== Bálint Balassi ==
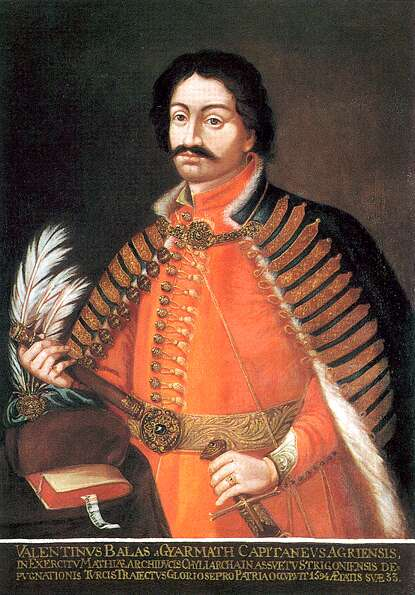
Bálint Balassi

Bálint Balassi (1554–1594) was a Renaissance lyric poet and regarded as a Hungarian in the deepest sense, the first to write the words "my sweet homeland" in reference to Hungary, a phrase which became a renowned canon of patriotism in Hungarian literature throughout the centuries that followed. Born into a wealthy and powerful noble family with strong ties to the House of Habsburg, Balassi was educated by the Hungarian Lutheran bishop Péter Bornemisza and was already writing notable verse at a young age. Balassi's short life was marked by financial ruin and a series of social failures: an unhappy marriage, unrequited love, slander, legal troubles, and a lackluster military career. He died early on in the war against the Ottoman occupation of Hungary during the siege of Esztergom-Víziváros, the same year as the result of a severe leg wound caused by a cannonball.

Balassi was a true Renaissance figure, a child of his age, a noble writer who was reckless in romance and hot-tempered, but also a humanist with exceptionally refined taste. It was he who was responsible for the rebirth of Hungarian literature, transforming Latin into the Hungarian language, making him the second world-class Hungarian poet after Janus Pannonius. A worthwhile contemporary of Ronsard, Spenser and Sidney, he was a loyal adherent to the Neo-Platonic philosophy of love and Francesco Petrarch's mode of poetic expression, which he refreshed with local flavor and new poetic solutions. Having been influenced by German, Italian, Polish, Turkish and perhaps also Croatian, Balassi absorbed Neo-Latin poetry at an early age, and eventually came to hold the same position in the history of Hungarian literature as that of Petrarch in Italian literature. Poems had already been written in Hungarian before him, but Balassi's technique of literary expression – fictive lyrical autobiographies in cycles of verse – was his true innovative gift to Hungarian literature. According to traditional historic accounts, he assembled his poems together, written in "his own hand" shortly before or after he left Hungary for Poland in 1589. The unprinted volume circulated for years thereafter and comprised a collection of 100 poems that depicted Balassi as a heavenly version of himself; hopelessly struggling with love, losing to Cupid, burned on the pyre of passion, relinquishing Julia, leaving his homeland, searching for his old love in a new one, embarking on a pilgrimage through hell, arguing with God in poetic guilt. It was this "virtual" Balassi that took the place of the "real" unsuccessful one and sparked the imagination of subsequent generations. His students not only respected him as an emblematic figure of Hungarian literature (and of the Hungarian language in a broader sense), but also of culture, worthy of following as a European model for the renewal of civilized life.
The more we know about Bálint Balassi and his work, the more he seems to be a poet who transcended borders. He was literally born on a border, in the Northern Hungarian-Turkish territory near Poland. His mother-tongue was Hungarian, but he probably learned Slovak and Polish from his nanny first. There is no doubting the honesty of his religious emotions, although he belonged to several denominations during his life - raised by a Lutheran, Calvinist parents, and then the influence of Jesuits during his adulthood. He lived for years with his father in the Court of Vienna and in the royal courts of Transylvania and Poland, perhaps becoming more familiar with the refined order of royal style and etiquette than any other Hungarian. His religious verse dealt with the passion of romance while his romantic poems used theological terms and soared to religious heights. Researchers have debated for years whether his descriptive language and place in Hungarian literature was that of the first Renaissance poet or that of the last troubadour. Whatever the case may be, Balassi was both archaic and ahead of his time, renewing contemporary fashion by reaching back to ancient sources and later incorporating features of Mannerism and Turkish poetic forms. Moreover, he did so in Hungarian, which offered no previous traditional model to follow. According to legend, he spoke seven languages in addition to his own: Latin, German, Italian, Slovak, Polish, Turkish and Croatian. Bálint Balassi was not only the first, but also the most deeply European Hungarian poet, and to this day his work continues to exemplify the openness of Hungarian intellectual life to Europe and the world.

== History ==
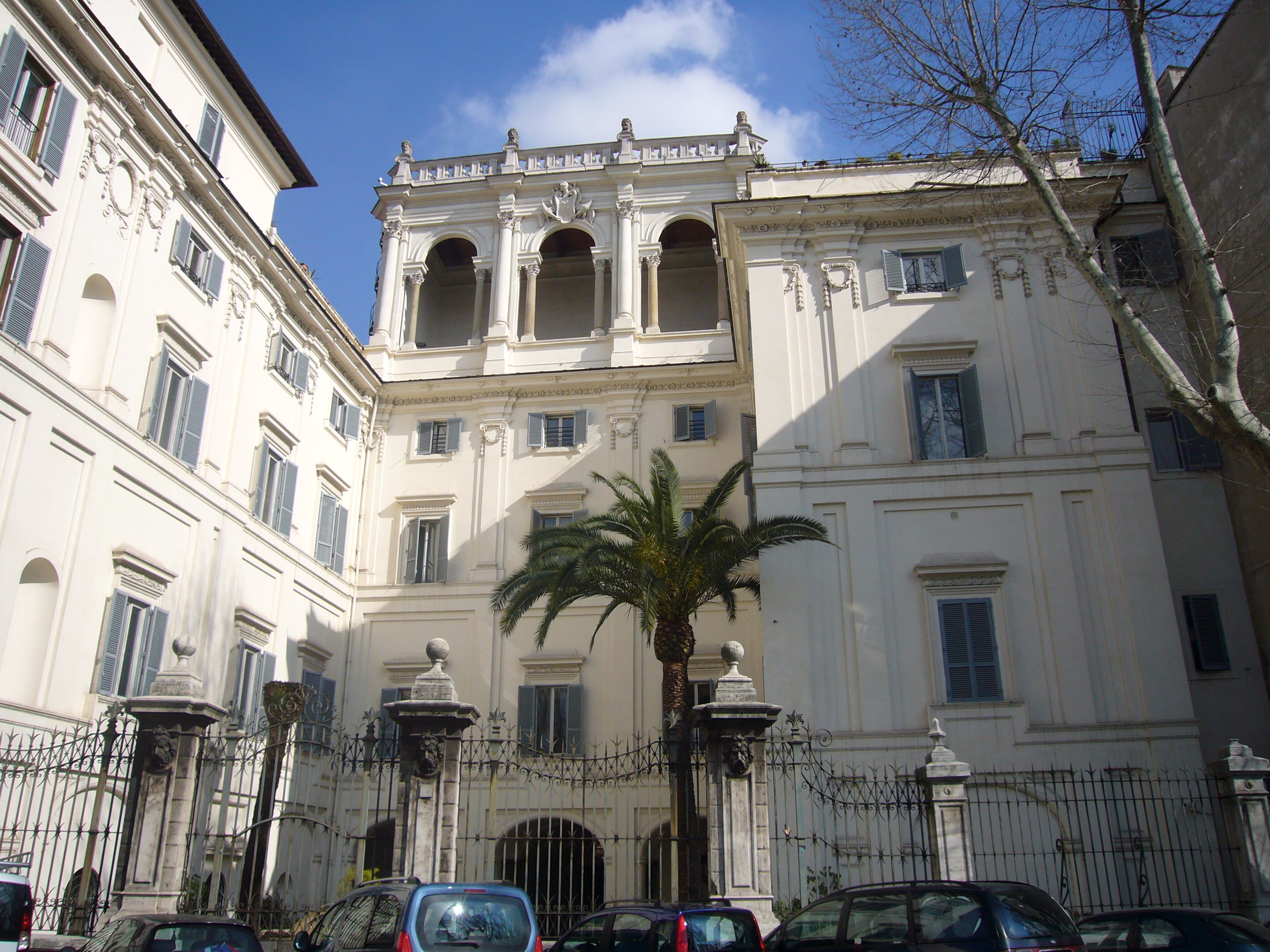
The Hungarian Academy Rome (Collegium Hungaricum Rome) – Palazzo Falconieri, Rome

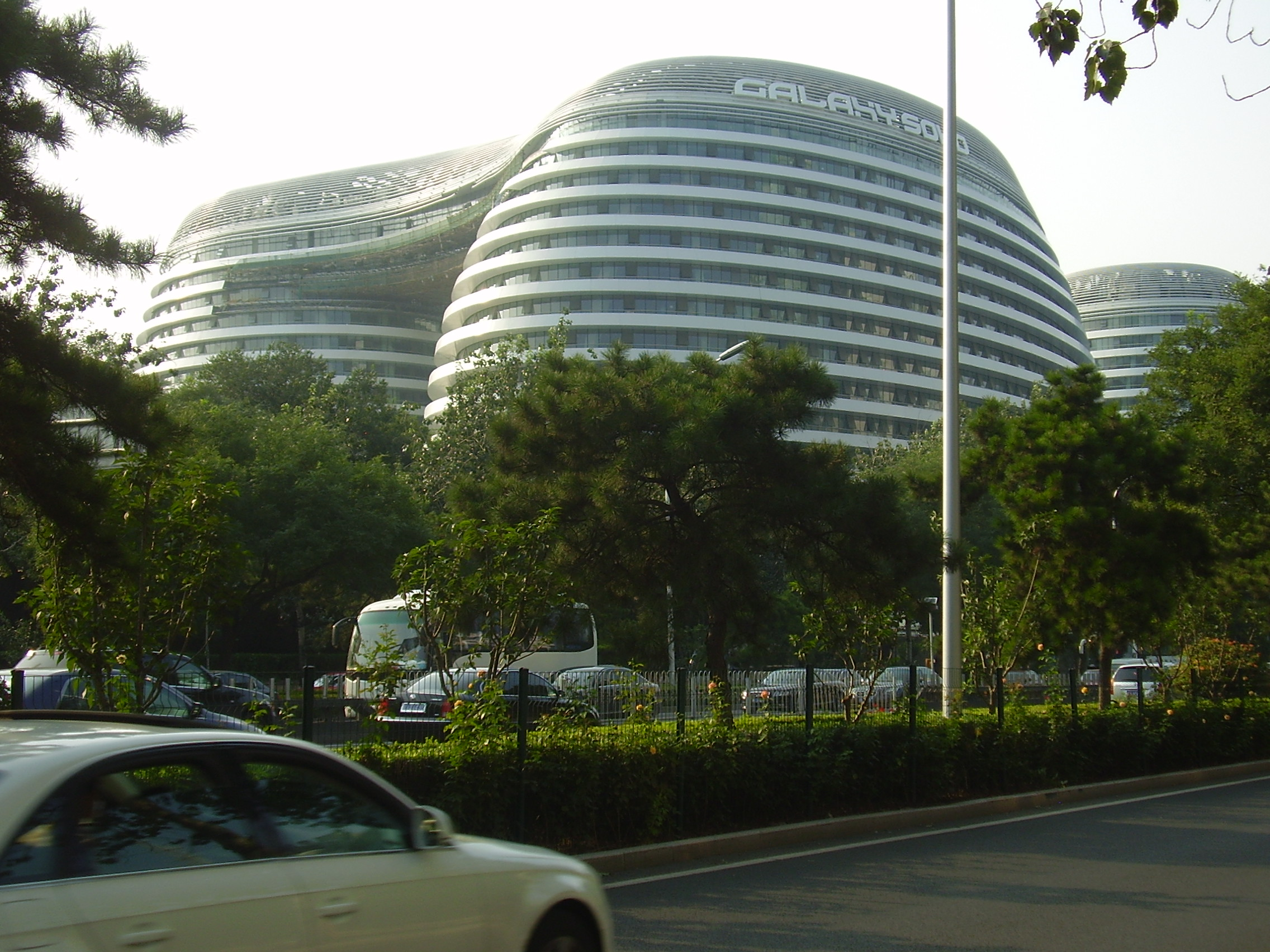
Galaxy Soho in Beijing, the home of the Hungarian Cultural Centre Beijing

- 1895 – Hungarian Historical Institute of Rome founded (abolished 1913)
- 1917 – Hungarian Scientific Institute of Constantinople founded (abolished 1918)
- 1920 – Hungarian Historical Institute of Vienna founded
- 1923 – Hungarian Historical Institute of Rome reestablished
- 1924 – Collegium Hungaricum Vienna and Collegium Hungaricum Berlin founded
- 1927
  - Act 13. of 1927 on Hungarian Institutes abroad and on scholarships for the purpose of high literacy
  - Collegium Hungaricum Rome founded at the Palazzo Falconieri.
  - Hungaro-French university informing office founded (from 1933 onward, it has been called the Hungarian Study Centre of France)
- 1948 – Institutes opened in Sofia and Warsaw
- 1949 – Institute of Cultural Relations founded
- 1953 – Institute opened in Prague
- 1973 – Institute opened in East Berlin (House of Hungarian Culture)
- 1974 – Institute opened in Cairo
- 1978 – Institute opened in Delhi
- 1980 – Institute opened in Helsinki
- 1990 – Institutes opened in Stuttgart and Moscow
- 1991 – Institute opened in Bratislava
- 1992 – Institutes opened in Bucharest and Tallinn
- 1999 – Institute opened in London
- 2001 – Institute opened in New York City
- 2002 – Renamed from Hungarian Cultural Institute to Balassi Institute
- 2004 – Institute opened in Brussels
- 2006 – Institute opened in Sfântu Gheorghe
- 2013 – Institutes opened in Beijing and Istanbul
- 2014 – Institute opened in Zagreb
- 2016 – Institute opened in Ljubljana

== Activities ==
Since 2002 the headquarters of the Balassi Institute is located at Somlói út 51, Budapest.

=== Cultural diplomacy ===
==== Hungarian cultural institutes ====
The first Hungarian institutes abroad, the so-called Collegium Hungaricum, were established by Kunó Klebelsberg (minister of culture at the time) in the 1920s in order to build relations with the international scientific community (in Vienna and Berlin in 1924, in Rome and Paris in 1927). Organising scientific life and education make up a fundamental part of the institutes’ activity even today. Apart from differences shaped by history, there are also variations in the scope of activities, services and equipment of the institutes. Some of them maintain libraries, Hungarian language teaching centers and galleries in addition to their primary work in culture, education and organising science.

Seats of Balassi Institute branches

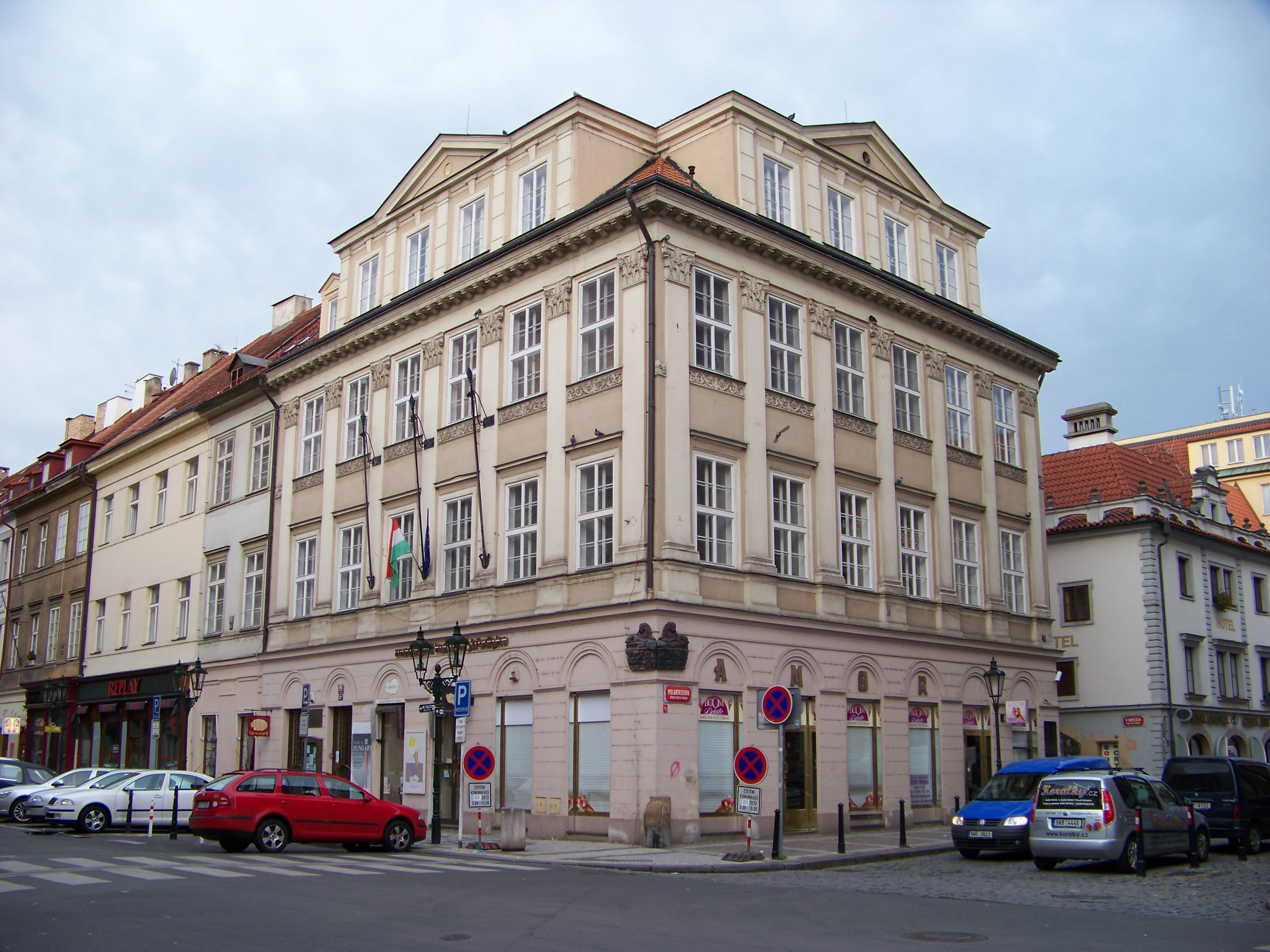
Prague

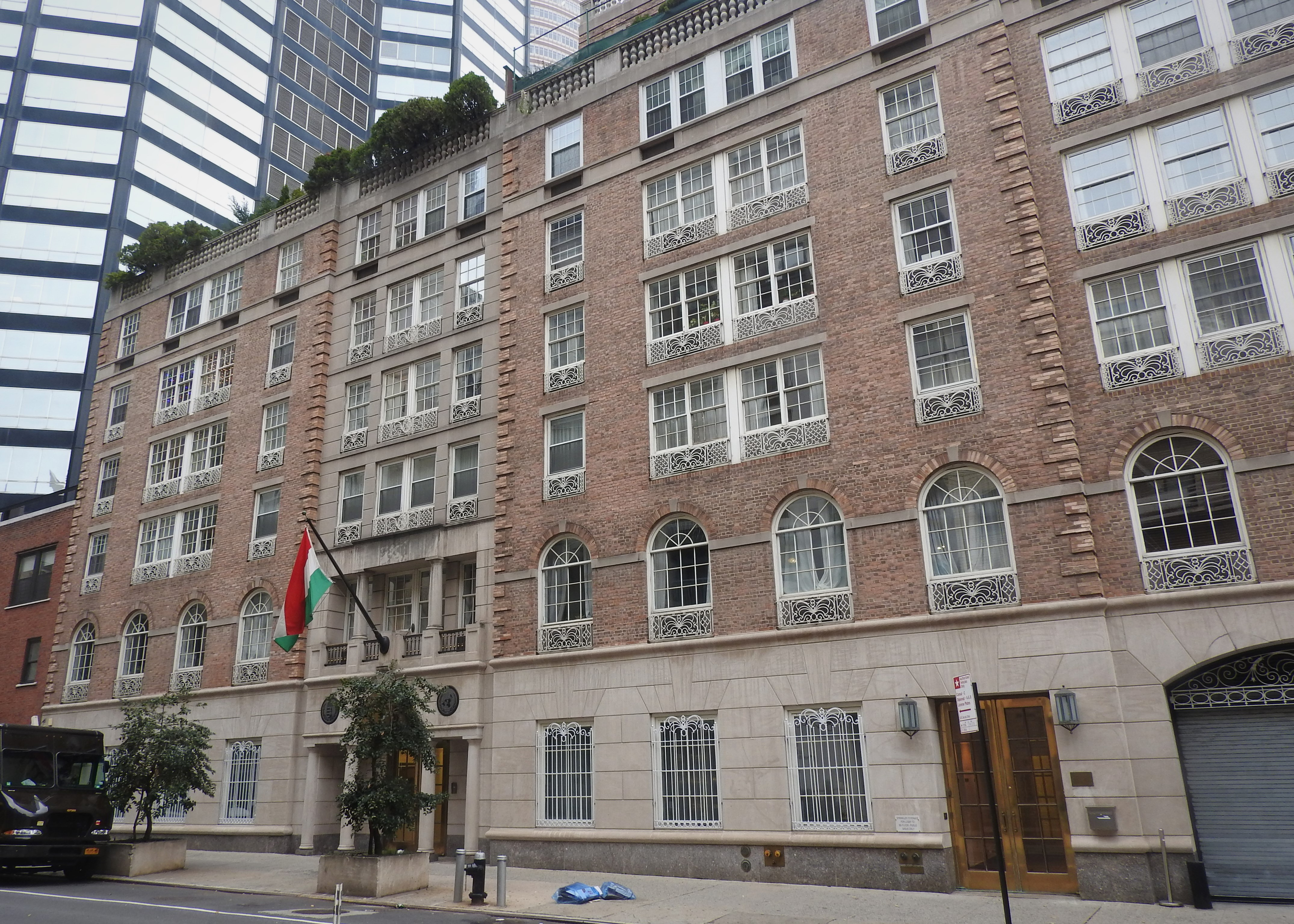
New York City

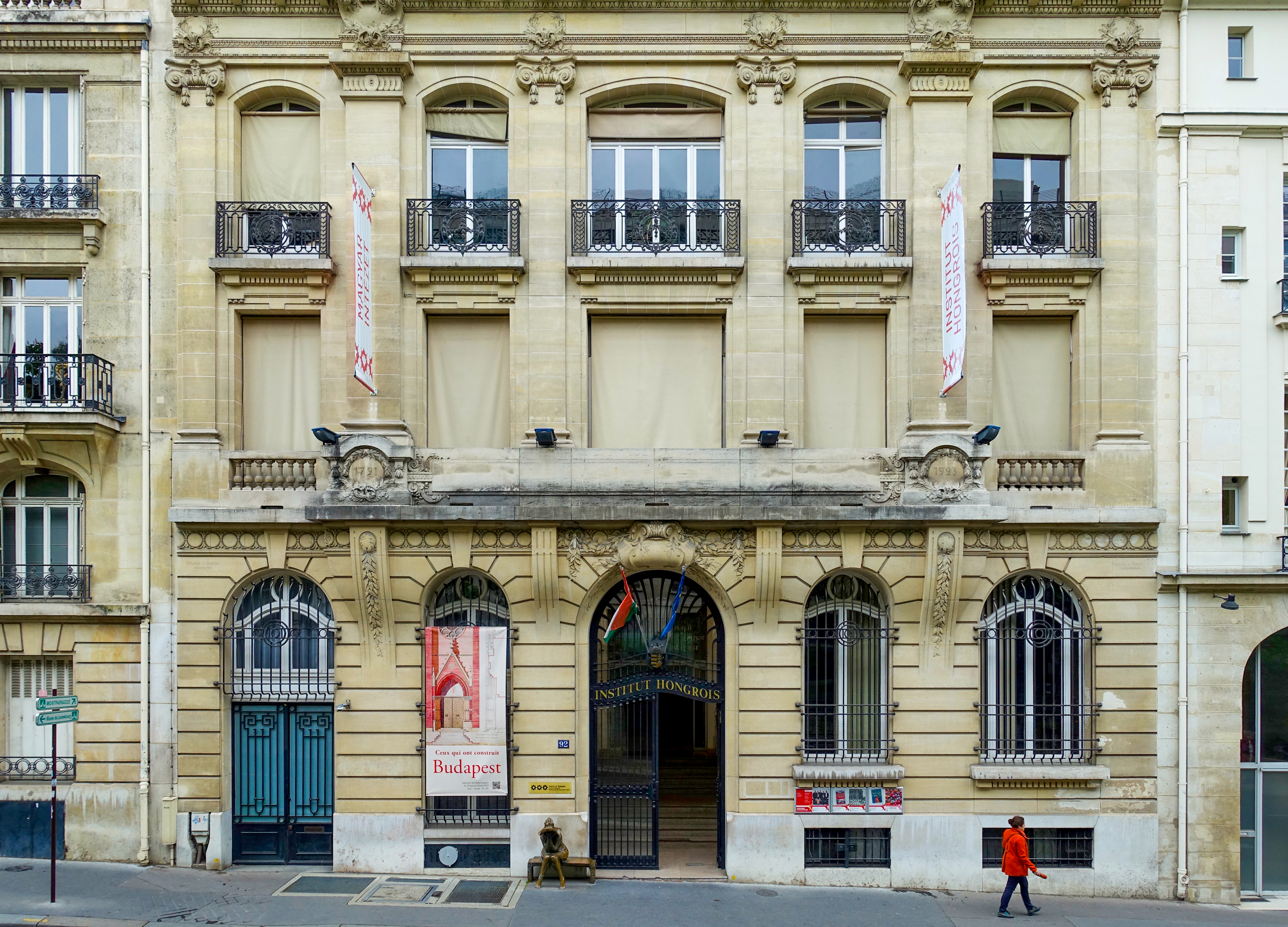
Paris

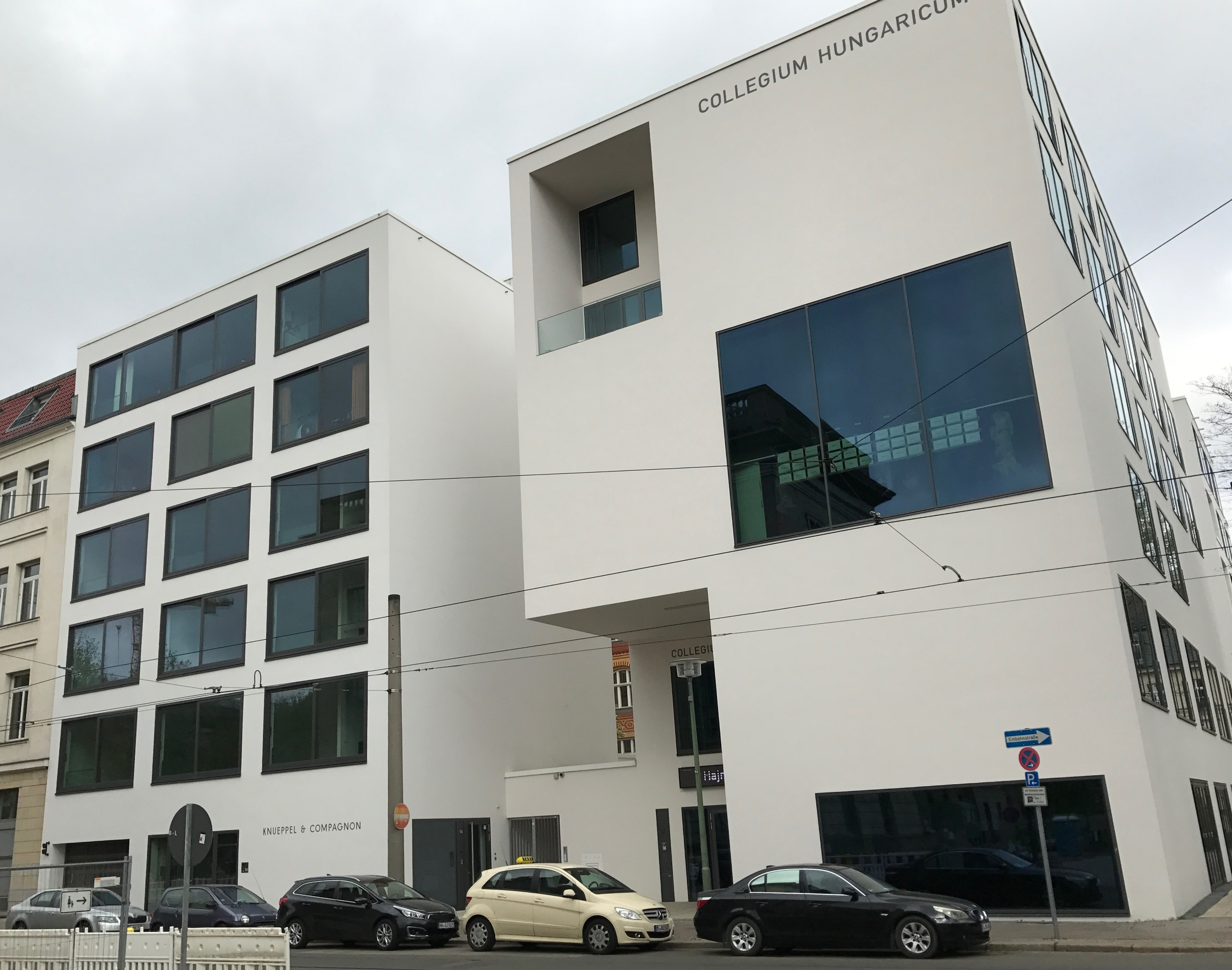
Berlin

The Balassi Institute has 26 branches in 24 countries around the world:

- (China) Hungarian Cultural Centre Beijing
- Hungarian Institute Belgrade (Serbia)
- Collegium Hungaricum Berlin (.CHB), Berlin (Germany)
- Hungarian Institute Bratislava (Slovakia)
- Balassi Institute Brussels, Cultural Service of the Hungarian Embassy Brussels (Belgium)
- Hungarian Cultural Centre Bucharest (Romania)
- Office of the Hungarian Cultural Counsellor, Cairo (Egypt)
- Hungarian Information and Cultural Centre, Delhi (India)
- Hungarian Cultural and Scientific Centre, Helsinki (Finland)
- (Turkey) Hungarian Cultural Centre Istanbul
- Balassi Institute Ljubljana (Slovenia)
- (United Kingdom) Hungarian Cultural Centre London (Great Britain)
- Hungarian Cultural, Scientific and Information Centre, Moscow (Russia)
- (United States) Hungarian Cultural Center, New York City (USA)
- Hungarian Institute Paris (France)
- Hungarian Institute, Prague (Czech Republic)
- Hungarian Academy Rome (Italy)
- Hungarian Cultural Center Seoul (South Korea)
- Hungarian Cultural Centre Bucharest, Sfantu Gheorghe Branch Office (Romania)
- Hungarian Cultural Centre Sofia (Bulgaria)
- Hungarian Cultural and Information Centre, Stuttgart (Germany)
- Hungarian Institute Tallinn (Estonia)
- Hungarian Cultural Center Tokyo (Japan)
- Collegium Hungaricum, Vienna (Austria)
- Hungarian Cultural Institute Warsaw (Poland)
- Hungarian Cultural Institute Zagreb (Croatia)

==== The network of the diplomats for culture and education ====
Diplomats specialised in education and culture promote Hungarian culture and education in countries where no such institutional representation is ensured.
Diplomats operate at the following foreign representations:

- Abu-Dhabi, United Arab Emirates
- Belgrade, Serbia
- Madrid, Spain
- Shanghai, China
- Tel Aviv, Israel
- Zagreb, Croatia

==== Joint institutes ====
Joint institutes are independently functioning institutions abroad promoting Hungarian culture, involved in broadly defined Hungarian cultural diplomacy via partnership and joint institutional agreements with the Balassi Institute. The aim of establishing the network was to enhance cooperation between coexisting institutions and the Balassi Institute in order to reach their shared strategic goals. Henceforth, the Balassi Institute supports certain programs of member institutes as well as their cultural, scientific and educational projects and helps them build relations with private and public institutions in Hungary.
Members of the network:

- Centre of Hungarian Education and Culture in Croatia - Eszék (Osijek), Croatia
- Hungarian Minority Centre of Culture - Lendva (Lendava), Slovenia
- Cnesa Educational and Cultural Institution - Magyarkanizsa (Kanjiza), Serbia
- Kőrösi Csoma Sándor Cultural Association - Gothenburg, Sweden
- Hungarian Youth Club Vietnam - Hanoi, Vietnam

=== Education ===
The institute, as a center for education and scientific cooperation, fulfills a supporting, coordinating and funding function in the international network of Hungarian Studies institutions and in the teaching of Hungarian as a foreign language.

==== Methodology center for teaching Hungarian as a second language ====
The institute not only provides support for Hungarian language training abroad, it also offers a wide range of language programs within Hungary. At the institute's central branch located in Budapest, those wishing to learn Hungarian can choose from a unique selection of in-depth courses geared toward various levels. Thanks to its highly trained, experienced staff of language teachers, the Balassi Institute is a leader in the methodology of teaching Hungarian as a Second Language. Its foremost task is not only to develop teaching materials for non-native speakers, but also to provide appropriate educational resources to teachers of Hungarian as a heritage language abroad. Other than the organization of seminars, conferences and training sessions, the publication of professional journals, e-textbooks and e-books also forms a vital part of the institute's mission.

==== Learning opportunities for foreign citizens ====
Programs either 10 months or 2–4 weeks in duration can be attended under scholarship or with a payment of tuition. Year-by-year, nearly 350 foreign students receive scholarships to participate in courses in Budapest. During the program, students have the opportunity to experience life in Hungary first-hand, benefit from intense language training in the classroom and forge lifelong friendships.

==== Program in Hungarian Language and Hungarian Studies ====
This course is open to foreign university students not of Hungarian descent; the purpose is to supplement language skills and cultural knowledge acquired at foreign universities. Completion of the internationally recognized ECL language exam is a requirement at the end of this intense language course. Hungarian Studies courses provide a comprehensive, interdisciplinary examination of Hungary's cultural heritage as well as of Hungarian society today.

==== Program in Hungarian Language and Culture ====
The purpose of this course is to strengthen the cultural identities of Hungarians living in diaspora communities. Young people of Hungarian descent—from outside the Carpathian Basin—are eligible for scholarships to this program. This specialized course focuses on increasing language competencies of speakers lacking formal education in Hungarian; the ECL language exam is a requirement for course completion. Participants receive a comprehensive, interdisciplinary examination of Hungary's cultural heritage and Hungarian society today.

==== Literary Translation Program ====
Non-Hungarian, foreign citizens can apply to this program, intended for those university graduates who have chosen the translation of Hungarian literature and the promotion of Hungarian culture abroad as the focus of their careers. While a practical introduction to literary translation forms the backbone of this program, in-depth instruction in Hungarian language and literature is also provided. The number of translations published throughout the years attests to the ability of the institute's literary translation alumni.

==== Preparatory Program for University Entry ====
Thanks to a series of bilateral cultural agreements, many non-Hungarian, citizens are able to attend this program on a scholarship; while the Scholarship Board for Minority Hungarians provides financial support to students of Hungarian descent. This preparatory program enables foreign students to acquire the kind of technical vocabulary and language proficiency demanded by the advanced-level, university entrance exam. Students who successfully complete the final exam may gain entry to those B.A.-level courses listed in the call for grant applications.

=== The guest lecturer network ===
The institute's network of guest instructors provides support for the teaching of Hungarian studies and language at over 30 foreign universities.
Lecturers are sent from Hungary to participate in programs at nearly 30 universities throughout Europe, thereby establishing close relations between Hungary's universities and the rest of the continent, while also laying the groundwork for future cultural and scholarly programs in the field of Hungarian Studies. Regularly held conferences, meetings and training sessions continue to further and deepen close professional exchanges.
Facilitating the teaching of Hungarology – also called Hungarian Studies- at foreign universities is at the forefront of the institute's international activity. Throughout the world more than fifty universities offer Hungarian language classes and an opportunity to meet Hungarian culture at lectorates, Hungarian departments and specialised Hungarian courses included in other majors.
The Balassi Institute as a legal successor of the International Hungarology Center sends visiting professors to more than thirty universities, with an average of 1500-2000 students attending their courses annually. Visiting professors’ tasks, in addition to classroom teaching, involve joining research projects, encouraging building relations with Hungarian universities and colleges, urging students to go on study tours in Hungary, taking an active part in introducing Hungarian culture to foreigners and organising local cultural events.

=== Scholarships ===
==== Hungarian Scholarship Board ====
The Hungarian Scholarship Board (HSB) Office provides scholarships for studying and to research, based on bilateral agreements. Therefore, Hungarian students and researchers can apply to a foreign country, and foreigners can apply to Hungary.
Since January 2007 the Hungarian Scholarship Board Office operates under the auspices of the Balassi Institute.

==== Campus Hungary ====
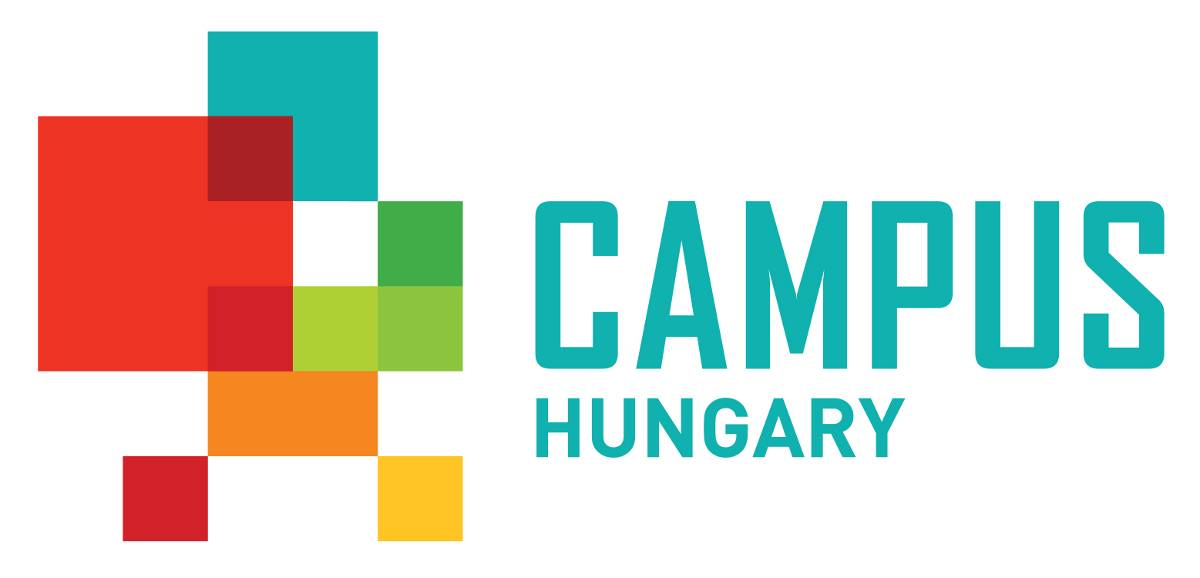

The Campus Hungary program aims to enhance international student mobility in higher education, both in terms of having more incoming foreign students to Hungary and also having more Hungarian students studying abroad. The program supports Hungarian students, academics and university staff with different kinds of scholarships for partial studies to study abroad and gain experience. The main goal of the program is to support and facilitate the internationalisation of Hungarian higher education by initiating and deepening cooperation with foreign higher education institutions and achieving knowledge exchange by means of student mobility.
The Campus Hungary program is executed with the financial support of the European Union in the framework of the Social Renewal Operational Program (TÁMOP) of Hungary. It is implemented by the consortium of the Balassi Institute and the Tempus Public Foundation.

=== Publishing Hungary ===
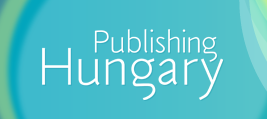

The Publishing Hungary Program was established by the National Cultural Fund of Hungary.
The main purpose of the program is to bring Hungarian publications — whether literary or non-fiction, recently published or classical works — to the attention of the international book trade and readers alike. From 2012 it will contribute 100 million forints yearly to the support of Hungary's participation on international book festivals, an effort coordinated by the Balassi Institute and other Hungarian institutes abroad.
The National Cultural Fund (NKA) will endow 100 million forints per year for participating on international book fairs between 2012 and 2014.

== Publications ==
=== Books ===
- Szabó, Eszter, ed. (2013). Inspired by Hungarian Poetry - British Poets in Conversation with Attila József. London, UK: Balassi Institute Hungarian Cultural Centre London. p. 110.
- Hatos, Pál; Novák, Attila, eds. (2013). Between Minority and Majority: Hungarian and Jewish/Israeli ethnical and cultural experiences in recent centuries. Budapest, Hungary: Balassi Institute. p. 262. ISBN 978-963-89583-8-9.
- Gremsperger, László; Nádor, Orsolya, eds. (2003). A magyar mint idegen nyelv és a hungarológia oktatása az Európai Uniós csatlakozás jegyében - Konferencia a Balassi Bálint Intézetben, 2003. március 13-14 [Teaching Hungarian as a second language and hungarology in the spirit of the accession to the European Union - Conference in the Balassi Bálint Institute] (in Hungarian). Budapest, Hungary: Balassi Bálint Institute. p. 155. ISBN 963-210-519-2. ISSN 1589-8083.
- Gordos, Katalin; Varga, Virág (2011). Miénk a vár! [The castle is Ours!]. Balassi exercise book series (in Hungarian). Vol. 1. Budapest, Hungary: Balassi Institute. ISBN 978-963-88739-7-2. ISSN 1589-8083.
- Gordos, Katalin; Varga, Virág (2012). Ünnepeljünk együtt! [Let's Celebrate Together!]. Balassi exercise book series (in Hungarian). Vol. 2. Budapest, Hungary: Balassi Institute. ISBN 978-963-88739-9-6. ISSN 1589-8083.
- Gordos, Katalin (2013). Kalandra fel! [Adventure ahead!]. Balassi exercise book series (in Hungarian). Vol. 3. Budapest, Hungary: Balassi Institute. ISBN 978-615-5389-10-8. ISSN 1589-8083.

=== Journals ===
- "Nemzeti évfordulóink" [National jubilees]. Nemzeti Évfordulóink (in Hungarian). Budapest, Hungary: Balassi Institute. ISSN 1785-6167.
- "THL2 - A magyar nyelv és kultúra tanításának szakfolyóirata" [THL2 - Journal of Teaching Hungarian as a 2nd Language and Hungarian Culture]. THL 2: A Magyar Nyelv És Kultúra Tanításának Szakfolyóirata (in Hungarian). Budapest, Hungary: Balassi Institute. ISSN 1787-1417.
- "Lymbus - Magyarságtudományi forráskozlemények". Lymbus: Művelődéstörténeti Tár (in Hungarian). Budapest, Hungary: Balassi Institute, National Archives of Hungary, International Association for Hungarian Studies, National Széchényi Library. ISSN 0865-0632.
