= Francesco Borromini =

Italian Baroque architect (1599–1667)

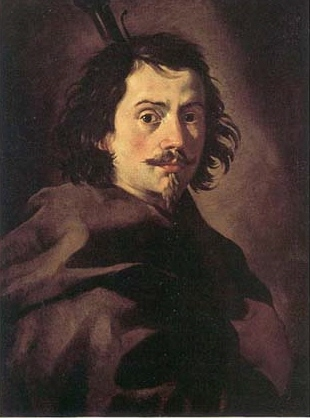
- Borromini (anonymous youth portrait)
- Born: Francesco Castelli; 25 September 1599; Bissone, Condominiums of the Twelve Cantons (Italian possessions of the Old Swiss Confederacy)
- Died: 2 August 1667 (aged 67); Rome, Papal States
- Occupation: Architect
- Buildings: San Carlo alle Quattro Fontane; Sant'Agnese in Agone; Sant'Ivo alla Sapienza; Oratorio dei Filippini

Francesco Borromini (/ˌbɒrəˈmiːni/, Italian: [franˈtʃesko borroˈmiːni]), byname of Francesco Castelli (Italian: [kaˈstɛlli]; 25 September 1599 – 2 August 1667), was an Italian architect born in the modern Swiss canton of Ticino who, with his contemporaries Gian Lorenzo Bernini and Pietro da Cortona, was a leading figure in the emergence of Roman Baroque architecture.

A keen student of the architecture of Michelangelo and the ruins of Antiquity, Borromini developed an inventive and distinctive, if somewhat idiosyncratic, architecture employing manipulations of Classical architectural forms, geometrical rationales in his plans, and symbolic meanings in his buildings. His soft lead drawings are particularly distinctive. He seems to have had a sound understanding of structures that perhaps Bernini and Cortona lacked, as they were principally trained in other areas of the visual arts. He appears to have been a self-taught scholar, amassing a large library by the end of his life.

His career was constrained by his personality. Unlike Bernini who easily adopted the mantle of the charming courtier in his pursuit of important commissions, Borromini was both melancholic and quick in temper, which resulted in his withdrawing from certain jobs. His conflicted character led him to a death by suicide in 1667.

Probably because his work was idiosyncratic, his subsequent influence was not widespread, but it is apparent in the Piedmontese works of Guarino Guarini and, as a fusion with the architectural modes of Bernini and Cortona, in the late Baroque architecture of Northern Europe. Later critics of the Baroque, such as Francesco Milizia and the English architect Sir John Soane, were particularly critical of Borromini's work. From the late nineteenth century onward, however, interest has revived in the works of Borromini and his architecture has become appreciated for its inventiveness.

== Early life and first works ==
Borromini was born at Bissone, near Lugano in today's Ticino, which was at the time a bailiwick of the Swiss Confederacy. He was the son of a stonemason and began his own career as one.

He soon went to Milan to study architecture and practice his craft. He moved to Rome in 1619 and started working for Carlo Maderno, his distant relative, at St. Peter's and then at the Palazzo Barberini. When Maderno died in 1629, he and Pietro da Cortona continued to work on the palace under the direction of Bernini.

Once he had become established in Rome, he changed his name from Castelli to Borromini, a name derived from his mother's family and perhaps, also out of regard for St Charles Borromeo.

== Major works ==
=== San Carlo alle Quattro Fontane (San Carlino) ===
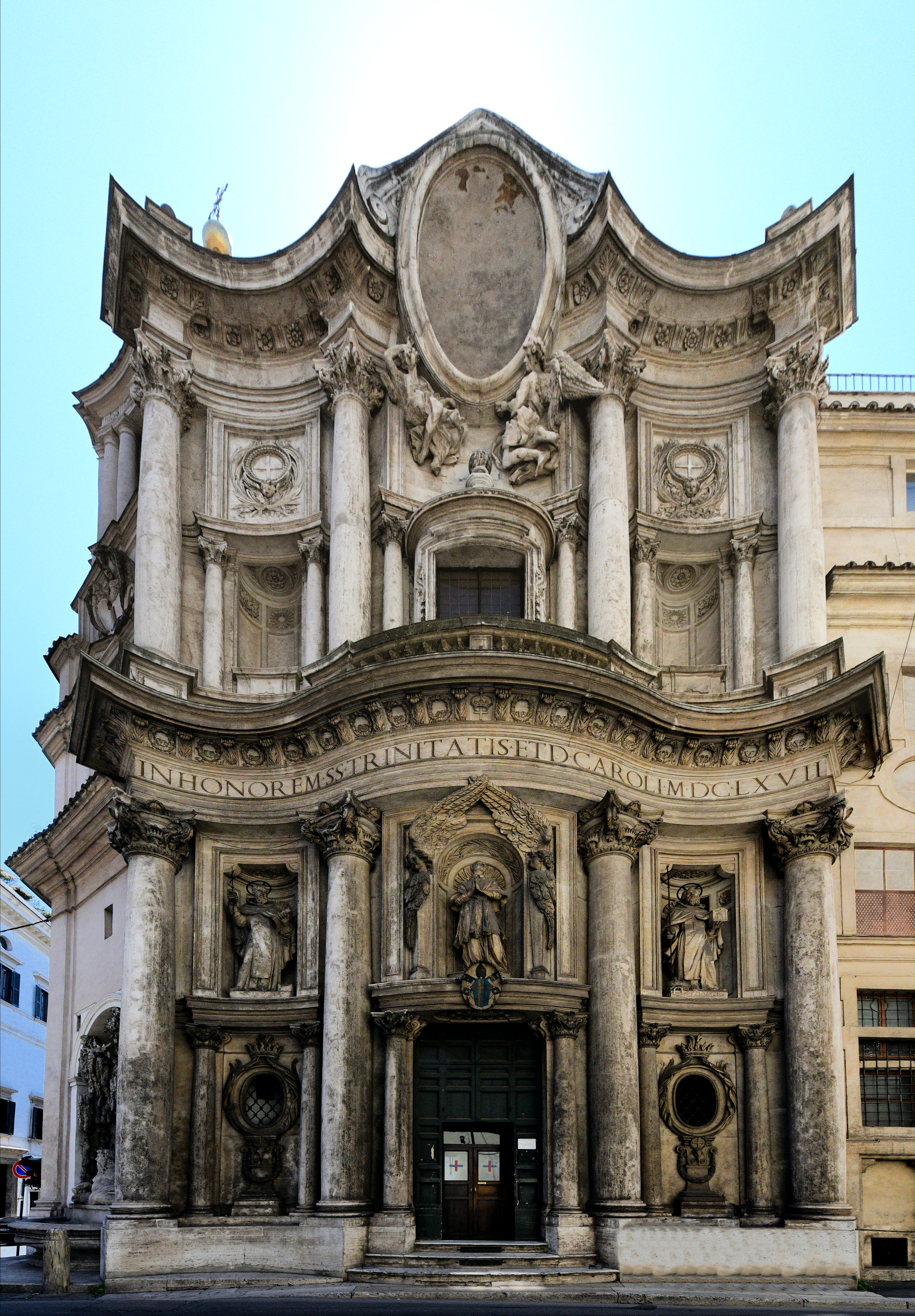
The forward and backward swinging facade of the church San Carlo alle Quattro Fontane in Rome

In 1634, Borromini received his first major independent commission to design the church, cloister and monastic buildings of San Carlo alle Quattro Fontane (also known as San Carlino). Located on the Quirinal Hill in Rome, the complex was designed for the Spanish Trinitarians, a religious order. The monastic buildings and the cloister were completed first after which construction of the church took place during the period 1638-1641 and in 1646 it was dedicated to San Carlo Borromeo. The church is considered by many to be an exemplary masterpiece of Roman Baroque architecture. San Carlino is remarkably small given its significance to Baroque architecture; it has been noted that the whole building would fit into one of the dome piers of Saint Peter's.

The site was not an easy one; it was a corner site and the space was limited. Borromini positioned the church on the corner of two intersecting roads. Although the idea for the serpentine façade must have been conceived fairly early on, probably in the mid-1630s, it was only constructed toward the end of Borromini's life and the upper part was not completed until after the architect's death.

Borromini devised the complex ground plan of the church from interlocking geometrical configurations, a typical Borromini device for constructing plans. The resulting effect is that the interior lower walls appear to weave in and out, partly alluding to a cross form, partly to a hexagonal form and partly to an oval form; geometrical figures that are all found explicitly in the dome above. The area of the pendentives marks the transition from the lower wall order to the oval opening of the dome. Illuminated by windows hidden from a viewer below, interlocking octagons, crosses and hexagons diminish in size as the dome rises to a lantern with the symbol of the Trinity.

=== Oratory of Saint Philip Neri (Oratorio dei Filippini) ===
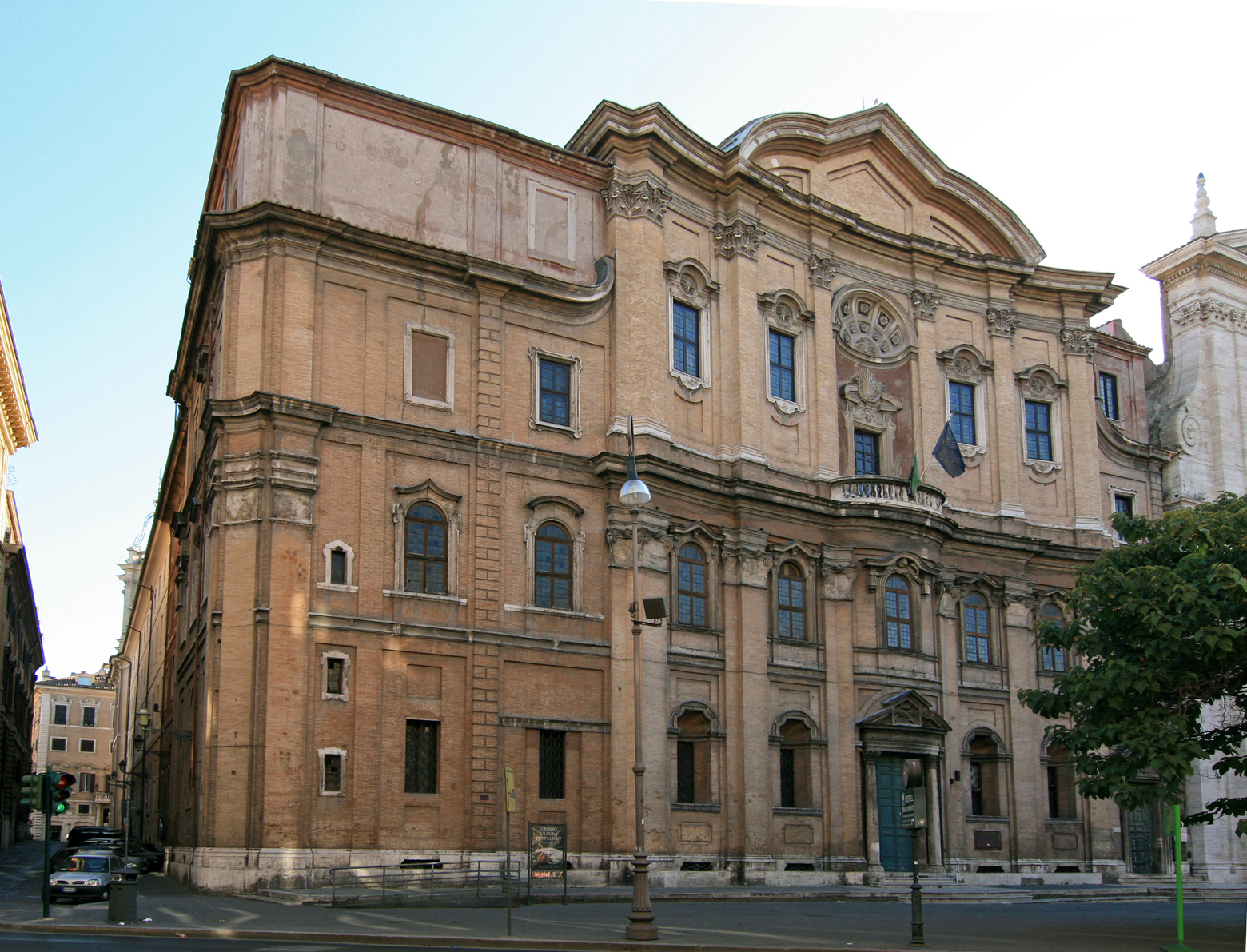
Oratory of Saint Philip Neri

In the late sixteenth century, the Congregation of the Filippini (also known as the Oratorians) rebuilt the church of Santa Maria in Vallicella (known as the Chiesa Nuova -new church) in central Rome. In the 1620s, on a site adjacent to the church, the Fathers commissioned designs for their own residence and for an oratory (or oratorio in Italian) in which to hold their spiritual exercises. These exercises combined preaching and music in a form that became immensely popular and highly influential on the development of the musical oratorio.

The architect Paolo Maruscelli drew up plans for the site (which survive) and the sacristy was begun in 1629 and was in use by 1635. After a substantial benefaction in January 1637, however, Borromini was appointed as architect. By 1640, the oratory was in use, a taller and richer clock tower was accepted, and by 1643, the relocated library was complete. The striking brick curved façade adjacent to the church entrance has an unusual pediment and does not entirely correspond to the oratory room behind it. The white oratory interior has a ribbed vault and a complex wall arrangement of engaged pilasters along with freestanding columns supporting first-level balconies. The altar wall was substantially reworked at a later date.

Borromini's relations with the Oratorians were often fraught; there were heated arguments over the design and the selection of building materials. By 1650, the situation came to a head and, in 1652, the Oratorians appointed another architect.

However, with the help of his Oratorian friend and provost Virgilio Spada, Borromini documented his own account of the building of the oratory and the residence and an illustrated version was published in Italian in 1725.

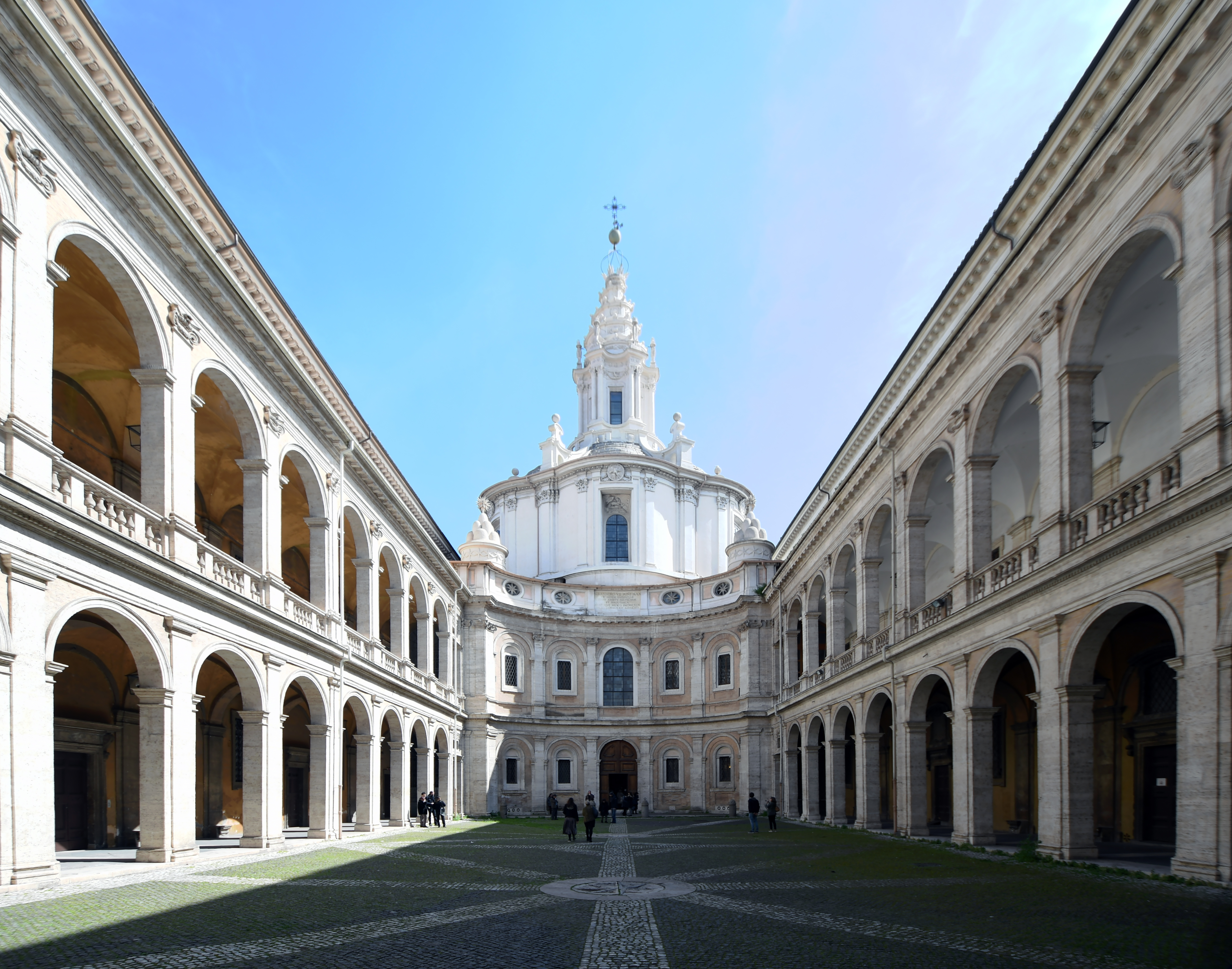
Sant'Ivo alla Sapienza built to abut an existing courtyard

Geometry of floor plan for Sant'Ivo alla Sapienza

=== Sant'Ivo alla Sapienza ===
From 1640 to 1650, he worked on the design of the church of Sant'Ivo alla Sapienza near University of Rome La Sapienza palace. It initially had been the church of the Roman Archiginnasio. He was recommended for the commission in 1632, by his then-supervisor for the work at the Palazzo Barberini, Gian Lorenzo Bernini. The site, like many in cramped Rome, is challenged by external perspectives, being built to abut the wings of an existing structure, at the end of Giacomo della Porta's long courtyard.

The dome and cochlear steeple are peculiar and reflect the idiosyncratic architectural motifs that distinguish Borromini from contemporaries. Inside, the nave has an unusual centralized plan circled by alternating concave and convex-ending cornices, leading to a dome decorated with linear arrays of stars and putti.

The geometry of the structure is a symmetric six-pointed star; from the centre of the floor, the cornice looks like two equilateral triangles forming a hexagon, but three of the points are clover-like, while the other three are concavely clipped. The innermost columns are points on a circle. The fusion of feverish and dynamic baroque excesses with rationalistic geometry is an excellent match for a church in a papal institution of higher learning.

=== Sant'Agnese in Agone ===
Borromini was one of several architects involved in the building of the church of Sant’Agnese in Agone in Rome. Not only were some of his design intentions changed by succeeding architects, but the net result is a building that reflects, rather unhappily, a mix of different approaches.

The decision to rebuild the church was taken in 1652 as part of Pope Innocent X's project to enhance the Piazza Navona, the urban space onto which his family palace, the Palazzo Pamphili, faced. The first plans for a Greek Cross church were drawn up by Girolamo Rainaldi and his son Carlo Rainaldi, who relocated the main entrance from the Via di Santa Maria dell'Anima to the Piazza Navona. The foundations were laid and much of the lower level walls had been constructed when the Rainaldis were dismissed due to criticisms of the design and Borromini was appointed in their stead.

Borromini began a much more innovative approach to the façade that was expanded to include parts of the adjacent Palazzo Pamphili family palace and to gain space for two bell towers he introduced. Each of the constructed bell towers has a clock, one for Roman time, the other for tempo ultramontano or European time. Construction of the façade proceeded up to the cornice level and the dome was completed as far as the lantern. On the interior, he placed columns against the piers of the lower order that was mainly completed.

In 1655, Innocent X died and the project lost momentum. In 1657, Borromini resigned and Carlo Rainaldi was recalled and he made a number of significant changes to Borromini's design. Further alterations were made by Bernini including the façade pediment. In 1668, Carlo Rainaldi returned as architect and Ciro Ferri received the commission to fresco the dome interior, which it is highly unlikely that Borromini intended. Further large-scale statuary and coloured marbling were also added; again, these are not part of Borromini's design repertoire that was orientated to white stucco architectural and symbolic motifs.

=== The Re Magi Chapel of the Propaganda Fide ===
The College of the Propagation of the Faith or Propaganda Fide in Rome includes the Re Magi Chapel by Borromini, generally considered by architectural historians to be one of his most spatially unified architectural interiors.

The chapel replaced a small oval chapel designed by his rival Bernini. It was a late work in Borromini's career. He was appointed as architect in 1648, but it was not until 1660 that construction of the chapel began. Although the main body of work was completed by 1665, some of the decoration was finished after his death.

His façade to the Via di Propaganda Fide comprises seven bays articulated by giant pilasters. The central bay is a concave curve and accommodates the main entry into the college courtyard and complex, with the entrance to the chapel to the left and to the college to the right.

== Other works ==
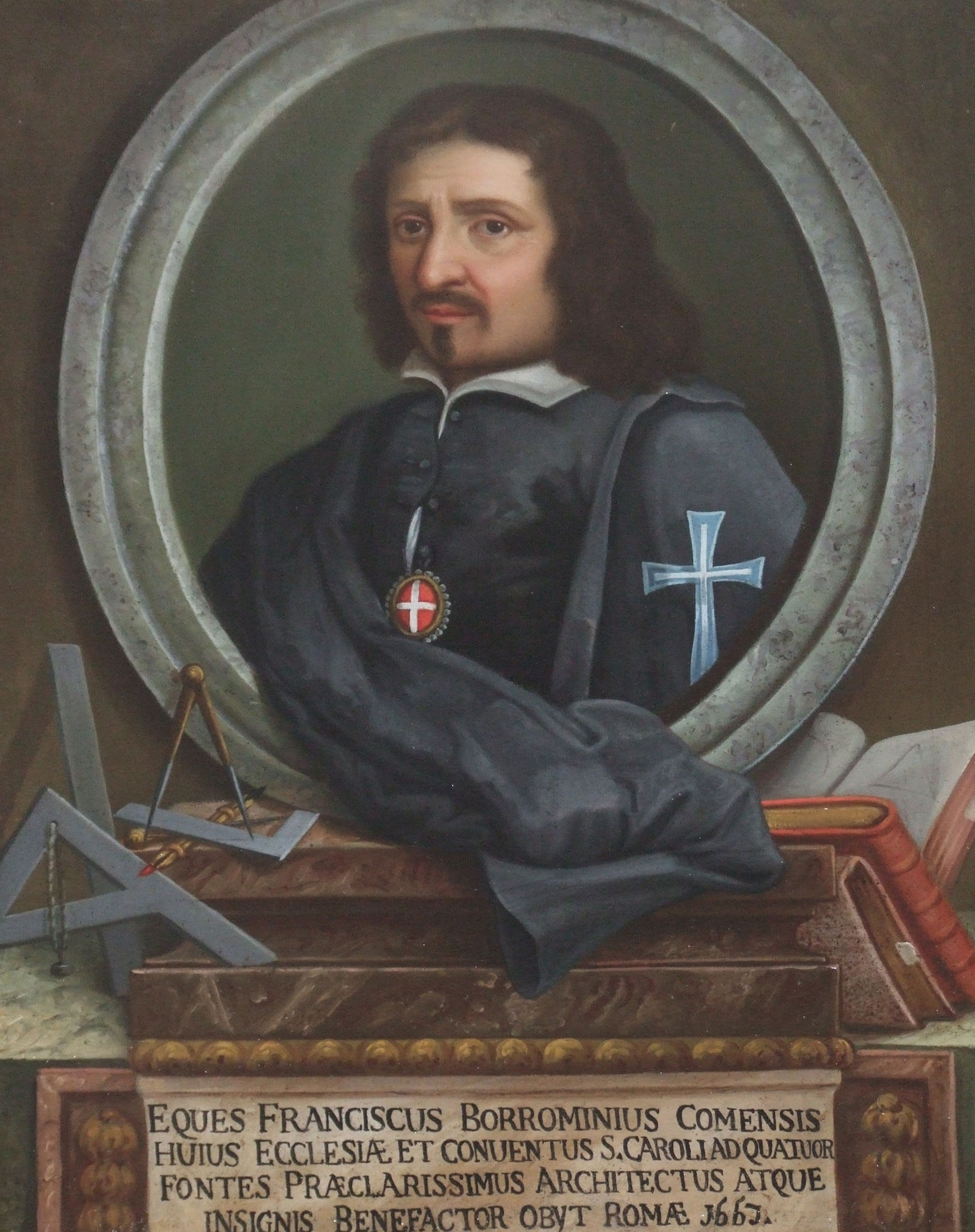
Portrait of Francesco Borromini kept in the sacristy of San Carlo alle Quattro Fontane

Borromini's works include:

- Basilica di San Giovanni in Laterano (interior)
- Cappella Spada, San Girolamo della Carità (uncertain attribution)
- Palazzo Spada (trick perspective)
- Palazzo Barberini (upper-level windows and oval staircase)
- Santi Apostoli, Naples (Filamarino Altar)
- Sant'Andrea delle Fratte
- Oratorio dei Filippini
- Palazzo Carpegna, Rome (ground floor portico and portal, helicoidal ramp leading to the upper floors)
- Collegio de Propaganda Fide
- Santa Maria dei Sette Dolori, Rome
- Santa Maria alla Porta, Milan (portal and tympanum)
- San Giovanni in Oleo (restoration)
- Palazzo Giustiniani (with Carlo Fontana)
- Palazzo Falconieri (façade and loggia)
- Santa Lucia in Selci (restoration)
- Saint Peter's Basilica (gates to Blessed Sacrament Chapel and possibly parts of baldacchino)

== Death and epitaph ==
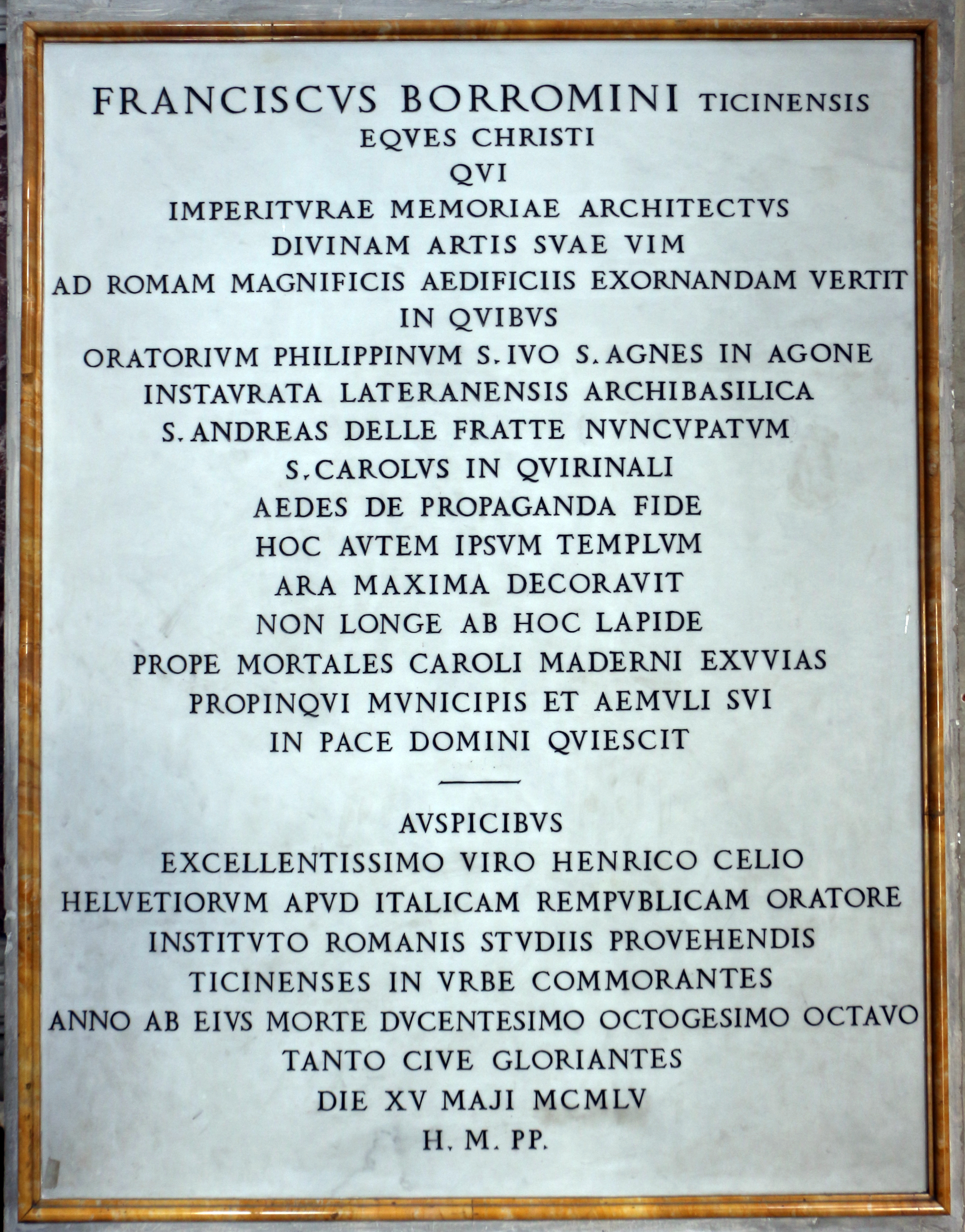
The plaque commissioned by the Swiss embassy in Rome to commemorate Francesco Borromini in the basilica of San Giovanni dei Fiorentini

In the summer of 1667, following the completion of the Falconieri chapel (the High Altar chapel) in San Giovanni dei Fiorentini, Borromini committed suicide in Rome by drawing his sword, resting the hilt against his bed, and falling on it "with such force that it ran into [his] body, from one side to the other". Depression may have been the cause.

The architect named cardinal Ulderico Carpegna executor of his will and bequeathed him money and objects of considerable value "for", as he wrote, "the infinite debt I have toward him". The prelate was a former patron who had commissioned Borromini important works of transformation and expansion of his palace at Fontana di Trevi. In his testament, Borromini wrote that he did not want any name on his burial and expressed the desire to be buried in the tomb of his kinsman Carlo Maderno in San Giovanni dei Fiorentini.

In 1955, his name was added to the marble plaque below the tomb of Maderno. A commemorative plaque commissioned by the Swiss embassy in Rome also was placed on a pillar of the church. The Latin inscription and respective English translation on the plaque reads:

FRANCISCVS BORROMINI TICINENSIS

EQVES CHRISTI
QVI
IMPERITVRAE MEMORIAE ARCHITECTVS
DIVINAM ARTIS SVAE VIM
AD ROMAM MAGNIFICIS AEDIFICIIS EXORNANDAM VERTIT
IN QVIBUS
ORATORIVM PHILIPPINVM S. IVO S. AGNES IN AGONE
INSTAVRATA LATERANENSIS ARCHIBASILICA
S. ANDREAS DELLE FRATTE NVNCVPATUM
S. CAROLVS IN QVIRINALI
AEDES DE PROPAGANDA FIDE
HOC AVTEM IPSVM TEMPLVM
ARA MAXIMA DECORAVIT
NON LONGE AB HOC LAPIDE
PROPE MORTALES CAROLI MADERNI EXUVVIAS
PROPINQVI MVNICIPIS ET AEMVLI SVI

IN PACE DOMINI QVIESCIT
Francesco Borromini from the Ticino

Knight of Christ
who
is an architect with an eternal reputation
divine in the strength of his art
who applied himself to the adornment of the magnificent buildings of Rome
among which are
the Oratory of the Filippini, S. Ivo, S. Agnese in Agone
reworking the Lateran archbasilica
S. Andrea delle Fratte
S. Carlo on the Quirinal Hill
the temple building of the Propaganda Fide
and also in this temple (S. Giovanni dei Fiorentini)
he decorated the High Altar
not far from this grave stone
near to the mortal remains of Carlo Maderno he was found
near to the city and his relative (Carlo Maderno)

in peace he rests with the Lord.

The adjective "Ticinensis" used after his name on the 1955 plaque is an anachronism, since that name is related to the Ticino river and that geographical name only came into use when the modern Canton of that name was created by Napoleon in 1803.

== Honours ==
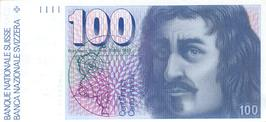
Borromini on the sixth series of the 100 francs note

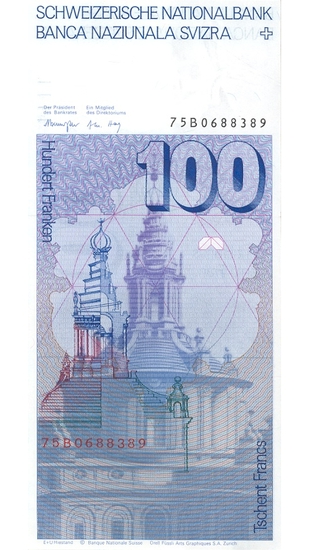
The obverse side of the discontinued 100 Swiss franc note, showing the bell tower of Sant'Ivo alla Sapienza in Rome

- Francesco Borromini was featured on Banknotes of the Swiss franc. He appears on the obverse of the sixth series 100 Swiss Franc banknote, which was in circulation from 1976 until 2000. This decision at that time caused polemics in Switzerland, started by the Swiss-Italian art historian Piero Bianconi. According to him, since in seventeenth century the territories which in 1803 became the Canton Ticino were Italian possessions of some Swiss cantons (Condominiums of the Twelve Cantons), Borromini could neither be defined Ticinese nor Swiss. The architect also was featured on the seventh series, which was a reserve emission that was never released. The reverse of both series shows architectural details from some of his major works.
- He is the subject of the film La Sapienza by Eugène Green released in 2015.
