= Francesco Antonio Franzoni =

Italian sculptor and restorer

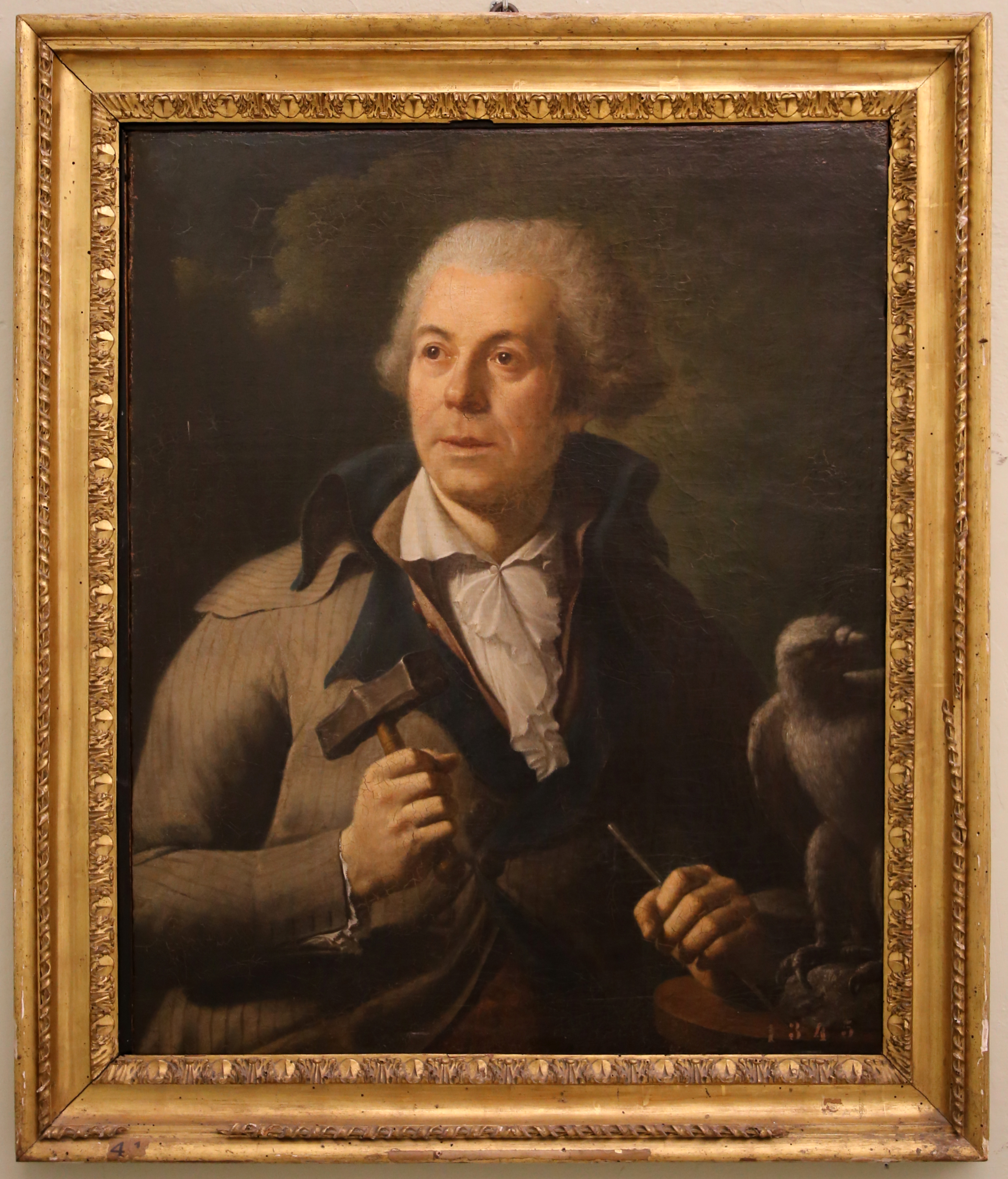
Portrait of Francesco Antonio Franzoni

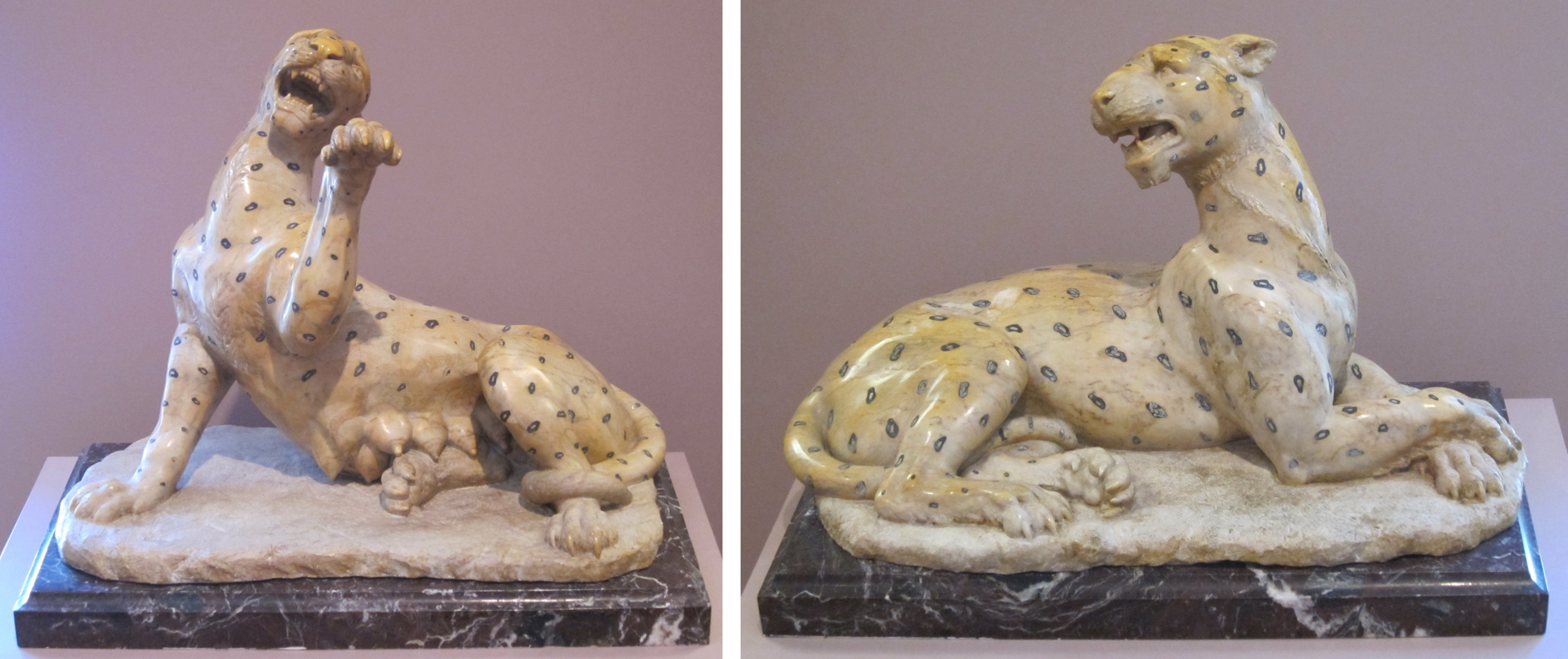
Pair of Leopards, attributed to Francesco Antonio Franzoni, intarsia (marble with marble inlay), Honolulu Museum of Art

Francesco Antonio Franzoni (1734–1818) was an Italian sculptor and restorer.

== Biography ==
Born in 1734 in the marble city of Carrara and trained there, Francesco Antonio Franzoni settled in Rome in the 1760s and established a workshop that specialised in the restoration of antique Roman sculpture, for which there was an insatiable demand, scarcely supplied by redoubled efforts at excavations. He worked on restoring, completing and refinishing sculptures destined for the Museo Pio-Clementino and provided marble revetments and sculptural details for its interiors, notably the biga (two-horse chariot) assembled in 1788 from antique elements, in the sala del Biga of the Braccio Nuovo. He worked for Pope Pius VI, for whom he filled a room with animal sculptures, some made up from antique fragments, in the Palazzetto del Belvedere; he also worked for the papal family at Palazzo Braschi.

He died in Rome in 1818.

== See also ==
- Orfeo Boselli
- Ippolito Buzzi
- Bartolomeo Cavaceppi
- Ercole Ferrata
- Francesco Fontana
- Francesco Nocchieri
- Giovanni Battista Piranesi
- Vincenzo Pacetti
