= Carlo Albacini =

Italian sculptor (1734–1813)

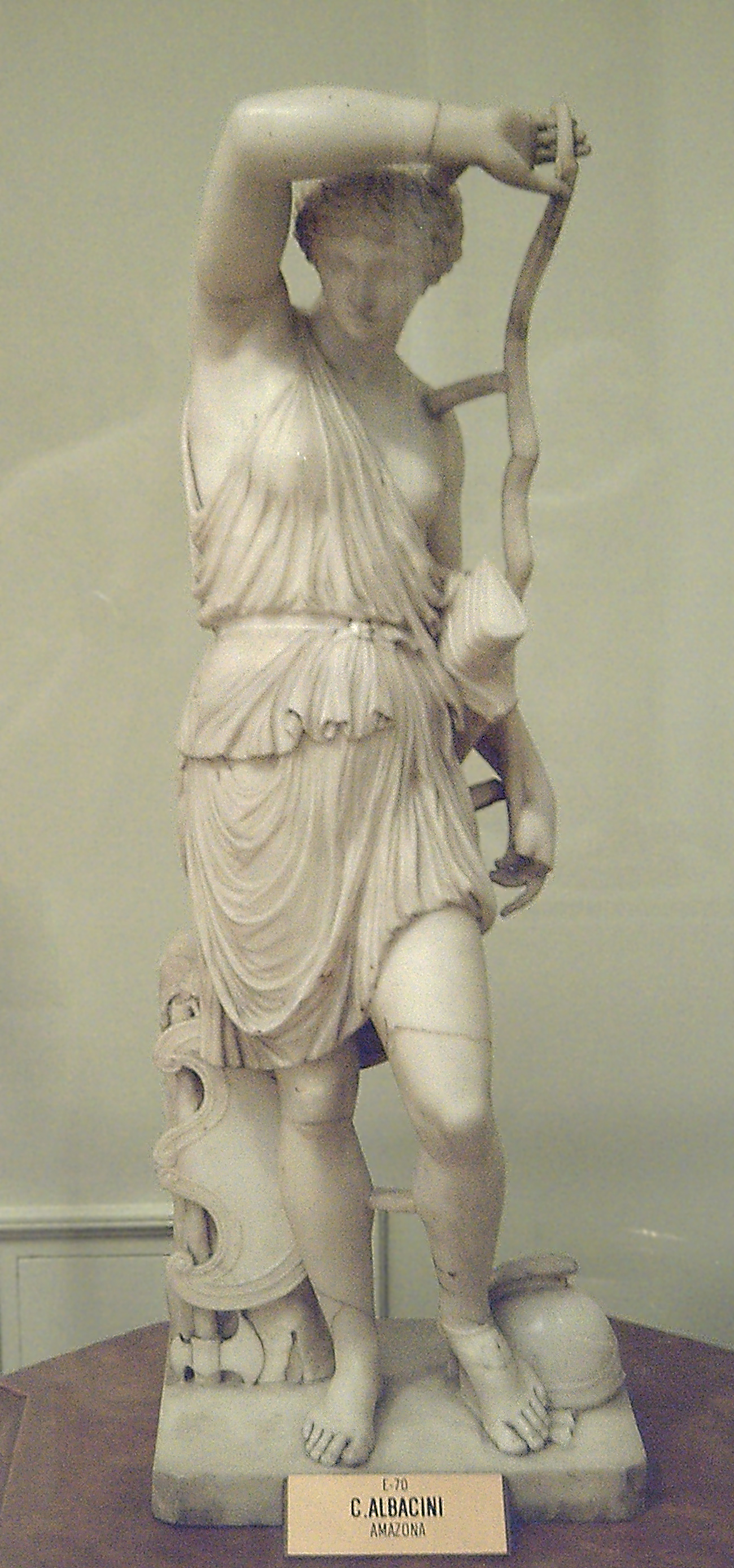
Amazon, marble after the original in the Capitoline Museums (Royal Academy of Fine Arts of San Fernando, Madrid)

Carlo Albacini (1734 – 1813) was an Italian sculptor and restorer of Ancient Roman sculpture.

He was a pupil of Bartolomeo Cavaceppi, an eminent sculptor and restorer of Rome. Albacini was notable for his copies after classical originals such as the Farnese Hercules; his version of the Castor and Pollux at the Prado is now in the Hermitage Museum) or the Capitoline Flora from Hadrian's Villa, for the Grand Tourist market. Like Cavaceppi, he also restored classical sculptures, notably the Farnese marbles, which Albacini worked on in 1786–89, in preparation for their transfer to Naples under the direction of the German painter Hackert and Domenico Venuti. Some of his restorations were free, by modern standards: in the famous Farnese Aphrodite Kallipygos at Naples, the head, the exposed right breast, left arm and right leg below the knee are restorations by Albacini. Not restored in Rome before shipment to Naples, however, were the Farnese paired Tyrannicides restored as Gladiators. Albacini was the principal restorer for Thomas Jenkins, whose pre-eminent client was Charles Townley; Townley's collection is at the British Museum. Townley introduced Albacini to Henry Blundell whose collection of Roman sculptures was magnificently displayed at Ince Blundell. In 1776 Blundell, considering that a fine modern copy was superior to a mediocre antiquity, commissioned from Albacini a copy of a colossal marble head of Lucius Verus; when the young Antonio Canova visited the workshops of Cavaceppi and of Albacini in 1779–80, he spoke to one of Albacini's garzonieri who said he had already spent fourteen months pointing up a copy of the Borghese bust of Lucius Verus and had five months of work still to do.

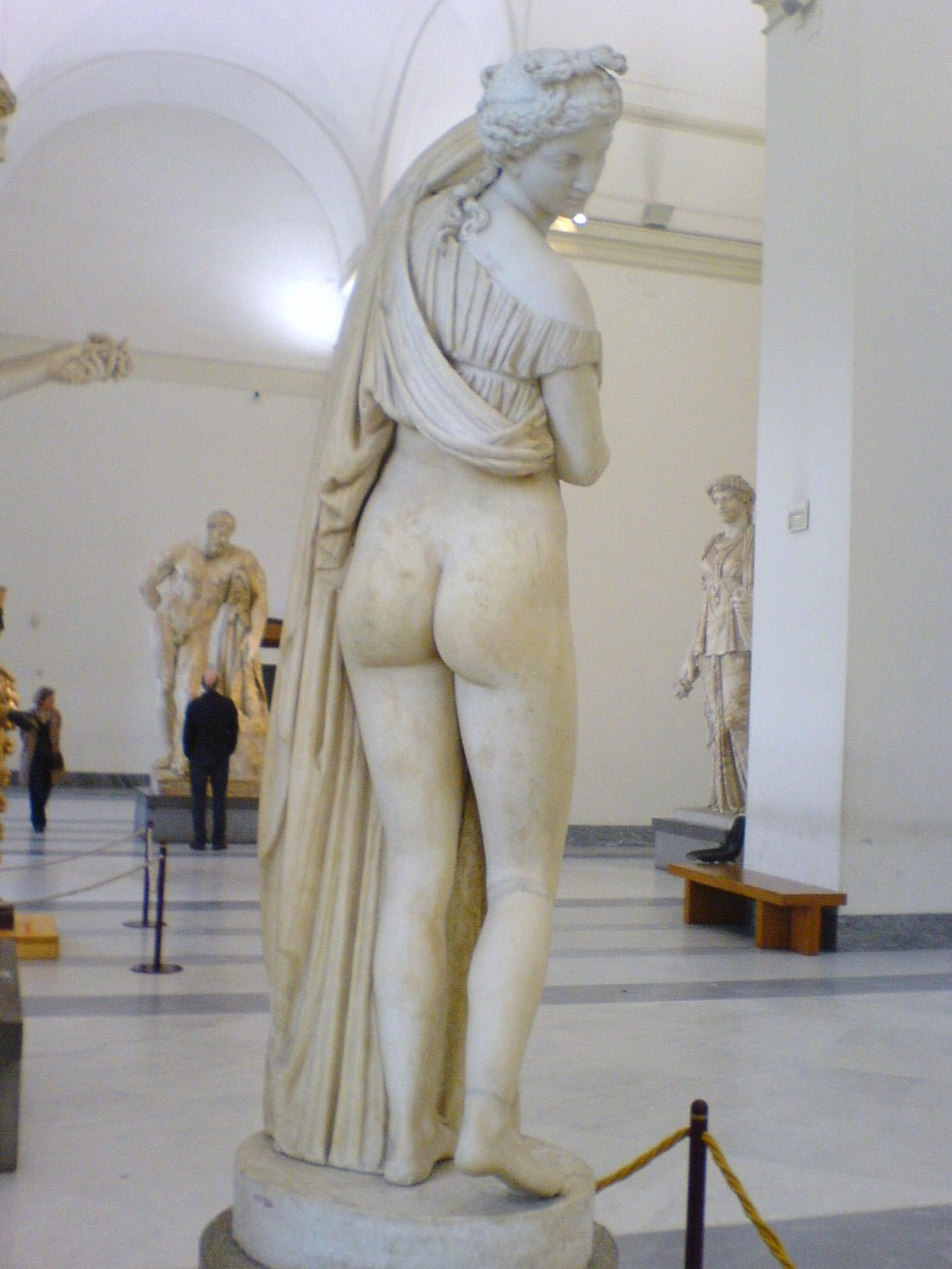
The Farnese Aphrodite Kallipygos, (National Archaeological Museum, Naples) restored in 1780s

He catalogued the immense collection of antique sculpture, some of its freely restored, left by Cavaceppi, and he assembled the collection of casts of Greco-Roman portrait busts that was sold by Filippo Albacini and can be seen in the Capitoline Museums, the Vatican Museums, in Naples, and at the Prado and Casa del Labrador, Aranjuez, the Real Academia de Bellas Artes de San Fernando, and especially at the National Gallery of Scotland, where the presence of a large group of plaster casts purchased from Albacini's son in 1838 was the subject of a colloquium on the varying reputation and cultural significance of casts of classical sculptures and the varying parameters of ethical restorations.

On a smaller scale his workshop, working with Luigi Valadier, produced the elaborate table-setting in gilded and patinated bronze and rare coloured marbles on the Romantic-Classical theme The Ruins of Paestum that was designed for Maria Carolina by Domenico Venuti, 1805.

As marble masons, Albacini's workshop also executed architectural sculptures, such as the two simple chimneypieces of white and coloured marble for the gallery of Ferdinand IV of Naples' hunting box, the Casino Reale at Carditello, about 14 km northeast of Naples. Pedestals for sculpture, for which Albacini was to be paid, were shipped from Livorno in 1780 by Gavin Hamilton intended for Thomas Pitt, later Lord Camelford, who did not take them.

His son, also Carlo Albacini (1777 – 1858), was a sculptor.

== Some other sculptors in Rome renowned for their restorations ==
- Orfeo Boselli
- Bartolomeo Cavaceppi
- Ippolito Buzzi
- Ercole Ferrata
- Francesco Nocchieri
- Francesco Fontana
- Giovanni Battista Piranesi
- Vincenzo Pacetti
