= Francesco Maria Nocchieri =

Italian sculptor

Francesco Maria Nocchieri, born in Ancona, was a seventeenth-century Italian sculptor of minor reputation active in Rome, where he spent time in the large studio of Bernini. He worked largely as a restorer of antiquities. He was among the many Roman sculptors patronised by Christina, Queen of Sweden in her retirement in Rome; for Christina he executed an Apollo (1680) to complement a set of Roman sculptures of Muses that had been found at Hadrian's Villa, which were doubtless restored by Nocchieri; the Apollo is now at La Granja de San Ildefonso. The largest collection of Nocchieri's sculptures today are in the Gardens of Aranjuez, Madrid. A terracotta bozzetto at the Ashmolean Museum represents Apollo holding his lyre, attentive to the Muses.

== Some other sculptors in Rome renowned for their restorations ==
- Carlo Albacini
- Orfeo Boselli
- Ippolito Buzzi
- Bartolomeo Cavaceppi
- Ercole Ferrata
- Francesco Fontana
- Giovanni Battista Piranesi
- Vincenzo Pacetti
