= Barbiani =

Barbiani is an Italian surname. Notable people with the surname include:

- Andrea Barbiani (1708–1779), Italian painter
- Bartolomeo Barbiani (1596–1645), Italian painter
- Giovanni Battista Barbiani (1593–1650), Italian painter, uncle of Andrea
