= The Apotheosis of Claudius =

Sculptural group

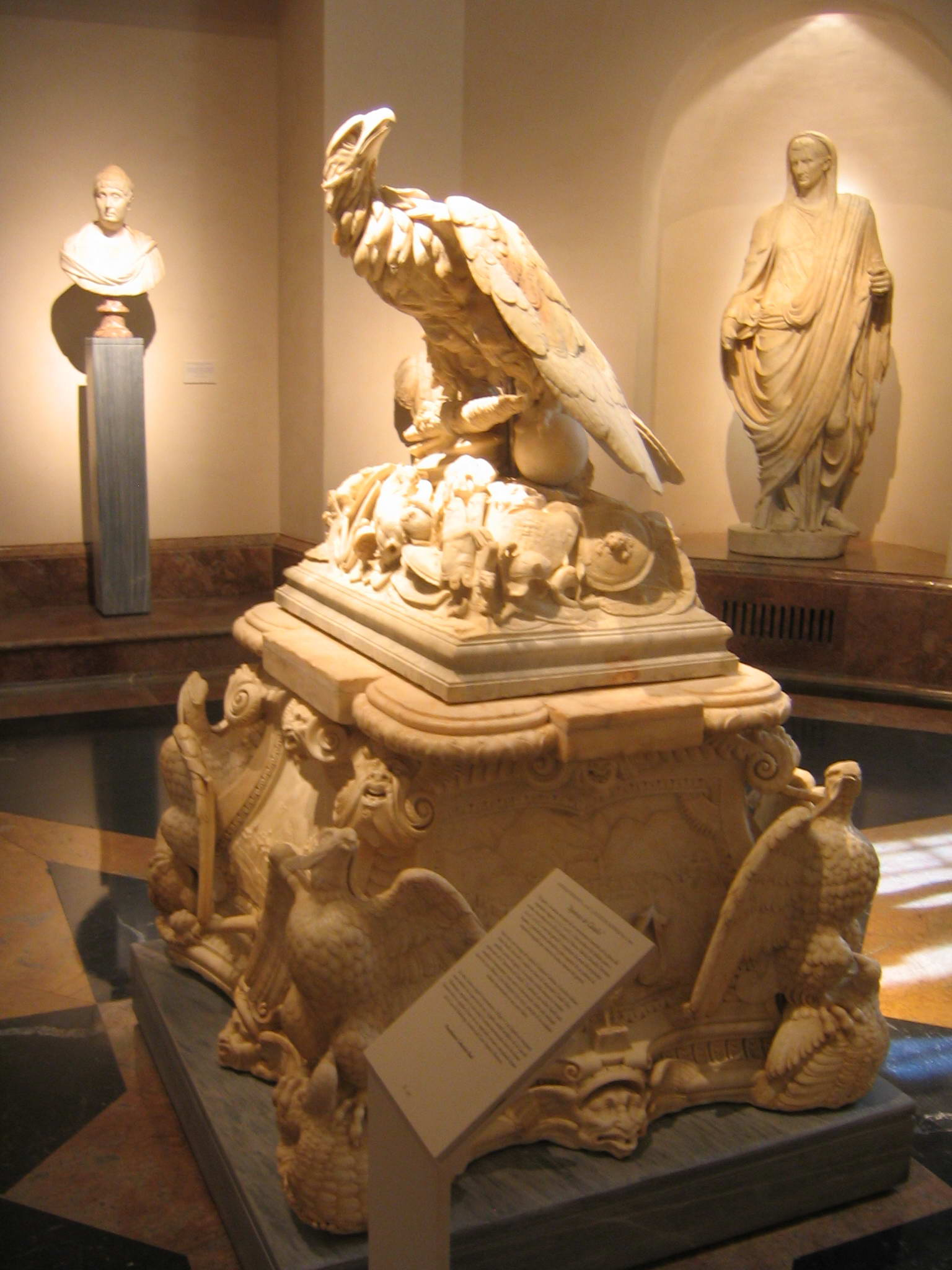
The Apotheosis of Claudius

The Apotheosis of Claudius is a sculptural group, now in the Prado Museum in Madrid with the catalogue number E00225. The upper part shows an eagle resting on a pile of weapons, originally a tropaion on a rectangular funerary pedestal on an urn – that pedestal and urn are now lost.

The tropaion (and possibly the pedestal and urn) were found in the villa on the estate of Marcus Valerius Messalla Corvinus (64 BC–8 AD), a Roman general, politician and patron of the arts. It was originally produced between 27 BC and 14 AD. The ancient part of the sculpture is inscribed IMPERATOR·CAESAR·DIVI·FILIVS·AVGVSTVS (the emperor Caesar Augustus, son of the deified [Julius Caesar]).

The work is named after a now-lost head of Claudius commissioned from Orfeo Boselli (1600–1676) by cardinal Girolamo Colonna, now lost but shown in at least two engravings of the group. This bust was added when the sculpture was placed on a later larger pedestal in the classical style, just before Colonna gave the work to Philip IV of Spain in 1664. The original bust of Claudius was lost in a fire at the Alcázar de Madrid in 1734 and replaced with another smaller version. That later bust has now been removed.
