= Santa Maria del Suffragio =

Santa Maria del Suffragio may refer to:

- Santa Maria del Suffragio, L'Aquila
- Santa Maria del Suffragio, Ravenna
- Santa Maria del Suffragio, Rome
