= Bartolomeo Cavaceppi =

Italian sculptor

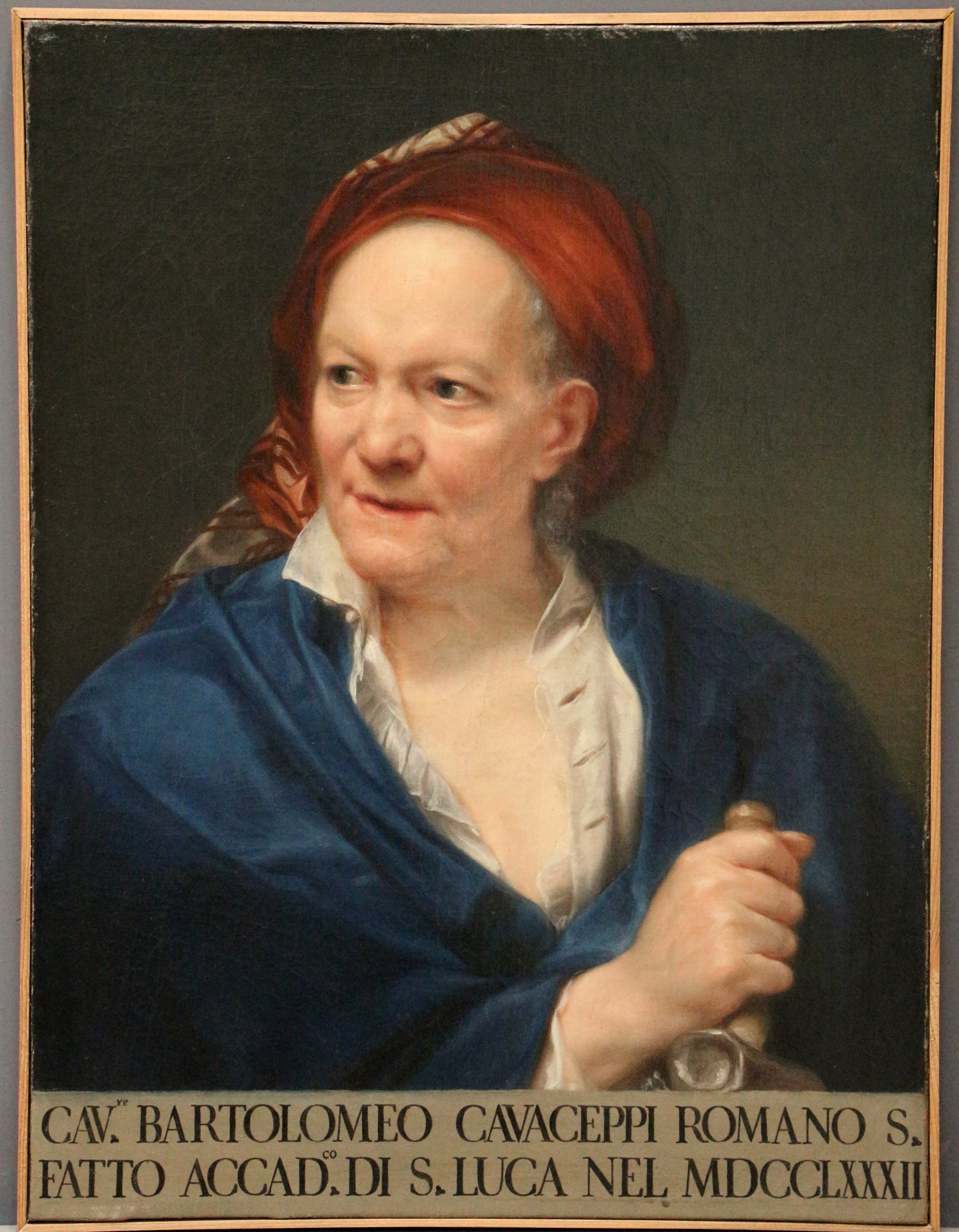
- Anton von Maron, Portrait of Bartolomeo Cavaceppi, c. 1794, Rome, Accademia di San Luca
- Born: c. 1716; Rome, Papal States
- Died: 9 December 1799 (aged 82–83); Rome, Papal States
- Education: Pierre-Étienne Monnot
- Known for: Sculpture
- Movement: Neoclassicism

Bartolomeo Cavaceppi (c. 1716 – December 9, 1799) was an Italian sculptor, restorer and antiquariansculptor, active in Rome during the Neoclassical period.

== Biography ==
Born in Romo around 1726, he trained in the Roman studio of the acclimatized Frenchman, Pierre-Étienne Monnot, and then in the workshop of Carlo Antonio Napolioni, a restorer of sculptures for Cardinal Alessandro Albani, who was to become a major patron of Cavaceppi, and a purveyor of antiquities and copies on his own account. The two sculptors shared a studio. Much of his work was in restoring antique Roman sculptures, making casts, copies, and fakes of antiques, fields in which he was pre-eminent and which brought him into contact with all the virtuosi: he was a close friend of and informant for Johann Joachim Winckelmann. Winckelmann's influence and Cardinal Albani's own evolving taste may have contributed to Cavaceppi's increased self-consciousness of the appropriateness of restorations — a field in which earlier sculptors had improvised broadly — evinced in his introductory essay to his Raccolta d'antiche statue, busti, teste cognite ed altre sculture antiche restaurate da Cav. Bartolomeo Cavaceppi scultore romano (3 vols., Rome 1768-72). The baroque taste in ornate restorations of antiquities had favoured finely pumiced polished surfaces, coloured marbles and mixed media, and highly speculative restorations of sometimes incongruous fragments. Only in the nineteenth century, would collectors begin for the first time to appreciate fragments of sculpture: a headless torso was not easily sold in eighteenth-century Rome.

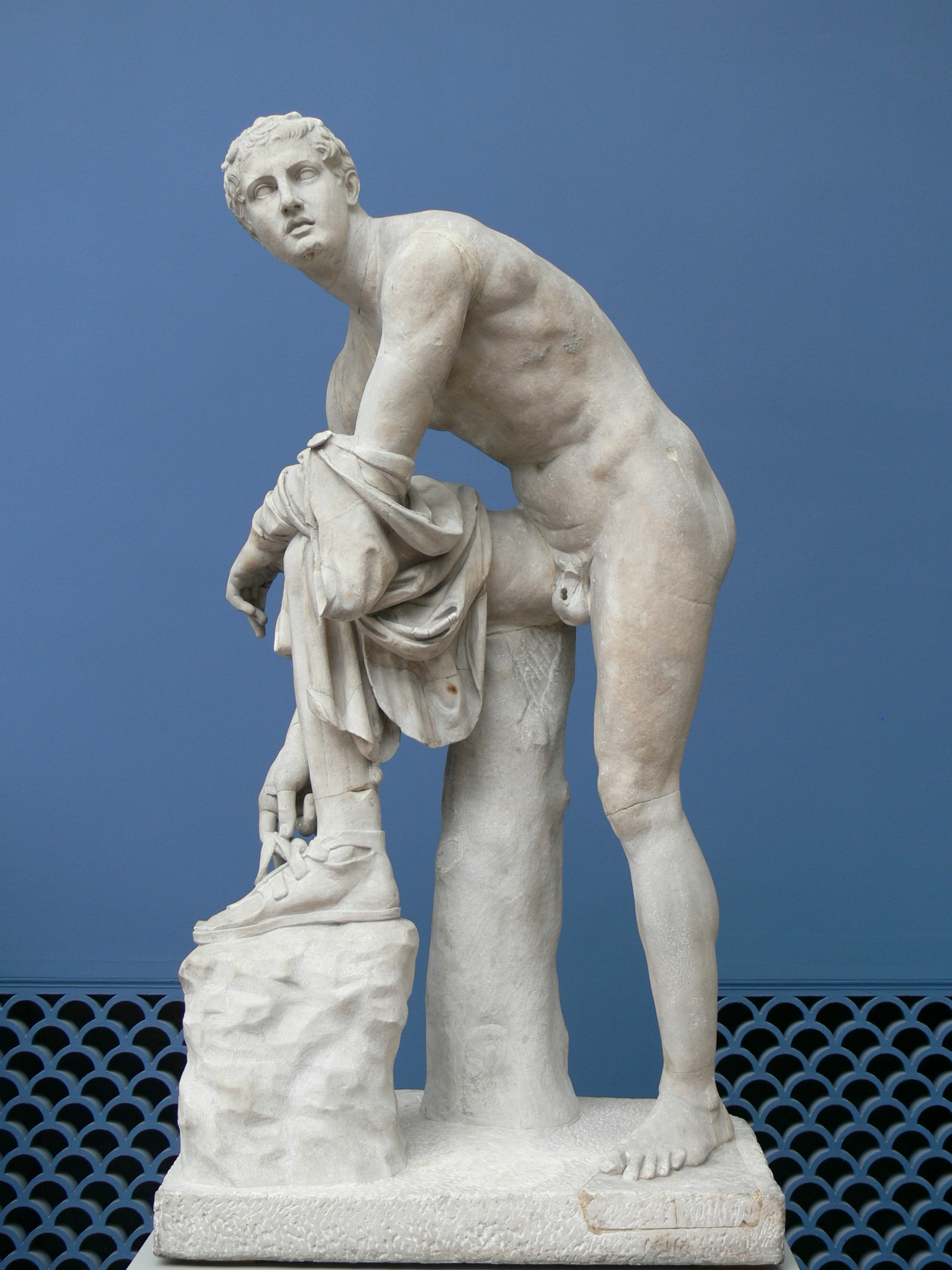
The Sandalbinder, an antique statue restored by Cavaceppi, Ny Carlsberg Glyptotek

In the competition for a permanent marble of Saint Norbert for the last available niche in St. Peter's Basilica, Cavaceppi, the candidate favoured by Cardinal Albani, lost out in the end to the more conservative declamatory Baroque manner of Pietro Bracci, who received the commission.

Cavaceppi, "now certainly one of the most underrated artist-personalities in that era" according to Seymour Howard, was the Pope's chief restorer, and a measure of his other clientele may be drawn from the plates that illustrated the works of art that had been restored in his extensive studio in the Raccolta, which appeared in three folio volumes, 1768-72. Haskell and Penny note that of sixty plates in the first volume, thirty-four reproduced works already belonging to Englishmen, while a further seventeen showed works in German collections. The remainder were divided among Cardinals Alessandro Albani and Giuseppe Alessandro Furietti (1684–1764) and Conte Giuseppe Fede, with one more in the Capitoline Museum and another belonging to Jacques-Laure le Tonnelier de Breteuil, the Bailli de Breteuil. The following year's volume showed sixty plates of sculptures that were all on the market. Cavaceppi made a considerable fortune from his endeavors.

Cavaceppi's studio, staffed with a host of assistants, was a stop for all the young connoisseurs making the Grand Tour. Goethe described his visit in Italienische Reise XXXII. Cavaceppi was entrusted with making casts of antiquities. Joseph Nollekens purchased from Cavaceppi the casts of the Furietti Centaurs that may still be seen at Shugborough Hall, Staffordshire; Cavaceppi also produced full-size copies in marble.

For his contributions in the formation of the Museo Clementino, based in large part on Albani's collection, Cavaceppi was made a Knight of the Golden Spur in 1770 and was henceforth Cavaliere Cavaceppi. His sculptures were presented for sale in the Museo Cavaceppi between the Piazza di Spagna and the Piazza del Popolo, the part of Rome most frequented by foreigners.

In the 1770s he carved a reduced version of Trajan's Column, which was purchased by the English virtuoso Henry Blundell to complement his antiquities at Ince Blundell; Blundell also acquired Cavaceppi's working model, a wooden column painted in grisaille.

At the time of his death, the collection of fragments and casts in the Museo was vast. Prince Giovanni Torlonia purchased over a thousand items from Cavaceppi's legacy. In some senses, Vincenzo Pacetti, who had collaborated with Cavaceppi on restorations and who supervised restorations and display of the Borghese collection at Villa Borghese was Cavaceppi's successor.

An exhibition "Bartolomeo Cavaceppi", curated by C.A. Picon in London, 1983, helped to bring him out of obscurity.

== Some other sculptors in Rome renowned for their restorations ==
- Carlo Albacini
- Orfeo Boselli
- Ippolito Buzzi
- Ercole Ferrata
- Francesco Nocchieri
- Francesco Fontana
- Giovanni Battista Piranesi
- Vincenzo Pacetti

== References and Further reading ==
- Howard, Seymour (1979). "Cavaceppi, Bartolomeo". Dizionario Biografico degli Italiani (in Italian). Vol. 22: Castelvetro–Cavallotti. Rome: Istituto dell'Enciclopedia Italiana. ISBN 978-88-12-00032-6.
- Bignamini, I.; Hornsby, C. (2010). Digging And Dealing In Eighteenth-Century Rome. New Haven-London: Yale University Press. pp. 252–255. ISBN 978-0300160437.
- M. G. Barberini and C. Gasparri, Bartolomeo Cavaceppi, scultore romano (1717-1799) [exhibition catalogue, Museo del Palazzo di Venezia, Rome] (1991)
- Haskell, Francis; Penny, Nicholas (1981). Taste and the Antique: The Lure of Classical Sculpture 1500-1900. New Haven: Yale University Press. ISBN 978-0300029130.
- Howard, Seymour, 'Bartolomeo Cavaceppi's Saint Norbert', in The Art Bulletin; 70.3 (September 1988), pp. 478–485. [Howard appends a list of original sculptures by Cavaceppi.]
- S. Howard, Bartolomeo Cavaceppi Eighteenth-Century Restorer [Ph. D. thesis, New York] (1982)
