= Orfeo Boselli =

Italian sculptor (1597–1667)

Orfeo Boselli, or Bosselli, (1597–1667) was an Italian sculptor working in Rome. As with most Roman sculptors of the sixteenth through the eighteenth centuries, a great part of his commissioned work was in restoring and completing fragmentary ancient Roman sculptures.

== Biography ==
He was a pupil of François Duquesnoy, whose classicising "Greek" manner was the antithesis to Gian Lorenzo Bernini's. Boselli was a member of the prestigious Accademia di San Luca in Rome, in which he served as its Principe for the year 1667 until his death on September 23.

== Boselli's Osservationi della Scoltura antica ==
Theories of proportions as exhibited in sculpture and dialogues on the relative merits of painting and sculpture were common enough in Renaissance and Baroque Italy, but they remained theoretical and rarely descended to the artisanal level. The treatise by Pomponius Gauricus, De sculptura offers a passage on bronze-casting by the lost-wax method. The Proemio of Giorgio Vasari's Le Vite de' più eccellenti pittori, scultori, ed architettori presents some workshop information on the practices of the architect, the sculptor and the painter. Only two sculptors have left extensive written material detailing the practice of their art. One, well known, is Benvenuto Cellini's Trattato dell'Oreficeria e della Scultura, 1568. The other, not published until 1939 and known only to art historians, is Orfeo Boselli's manuscript Osservationi della Scoltura antica written in the 1650s. It is conserved in the Corsini library in Rome. The treatise is apparently a distillation of the lectures he gave at the Accademia.

== Works ==
Orfeo Boselli provided marble sculptures to designs made by Martino Longhi the Younger in 1642-1643 for the high altar designed by Longhi in the church of San Carlo ai Catinari, 1643-1651, in Rome.

Among sculptures restored by Boselli, he mentions in the Osservationi the Colonna Claudius that is now in the Prado, Madrid.

== Some other sculptors in Rome renowned for their restorations ==
- Carlo Albacini
- Ippolito Buzzi
- Valerio Cioli
- Giovantonio Dosio
- Ercole Ferrata
- Francesco Nocchieri
- Francesco Fontana
- Bartolomeo Cavaceppi
