= Palazzo Panciatichi, Florence =

Coordinates: 43.7747°N 11.2564°E

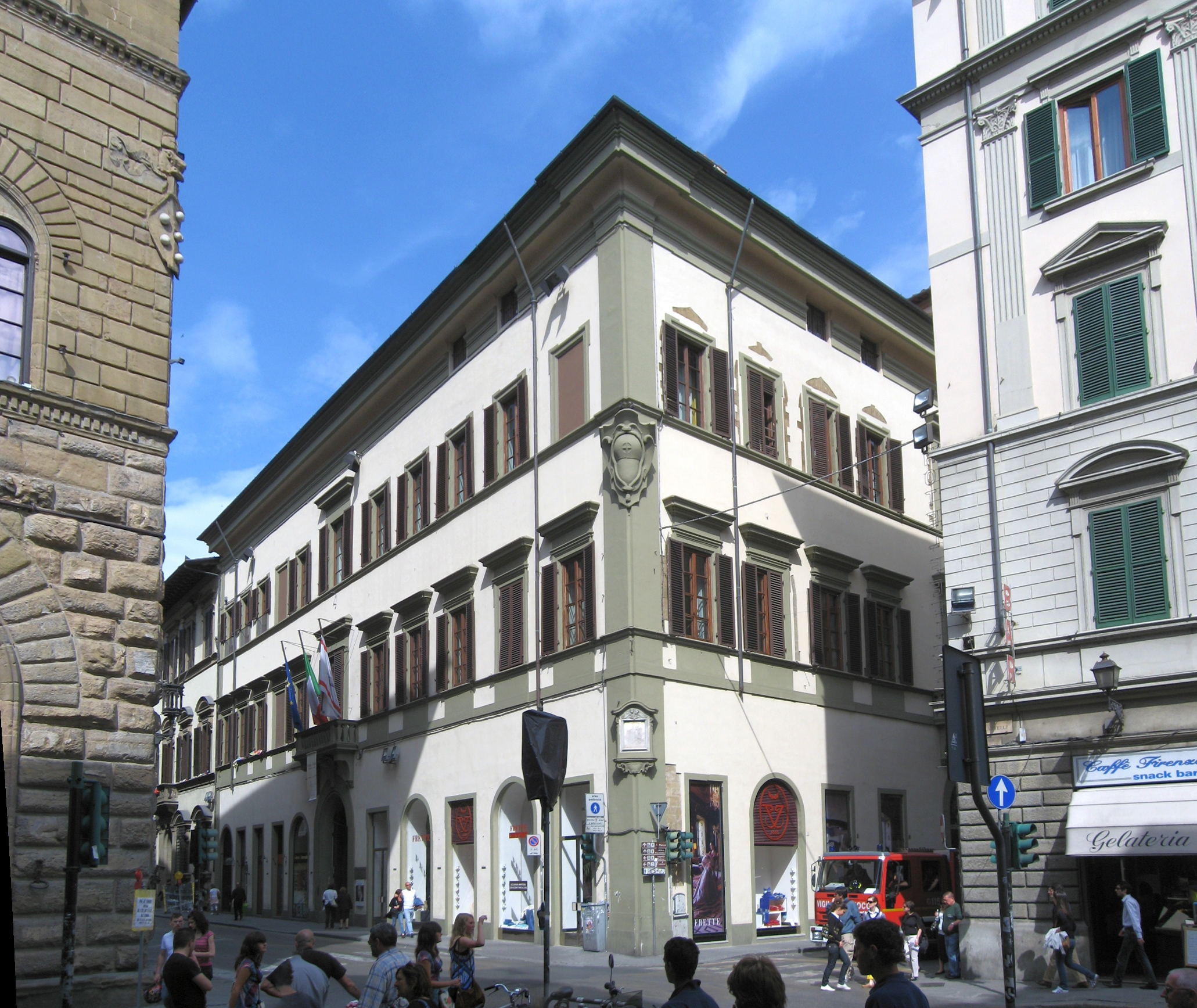
Palazzo Panciatichi

The Palazzo Panciatichi is a Renaissance palace located on Via Camillo Cavour 2 in the quartiere of San Giovanni, Florence, region of Tuscany, Italy. A different Palazzo Panciatichi-Ximenes or Ximenes-da Sangallo is located at Borgo Pinti 68, corner of via Giusti, in Florence.

== History ==
A large house was built at this site by Agnolo di Ghezzo della Casa at the end of the fourteenth century. Excavations at the site located the remains of an 11th-century bridge over the former river Mugnone. In 1618, the property was bought by Capponi, then in 1621, by the wealthy merchant Bandino Niccolò Panciatichi, who commissioned two terraces and moved the portal.

In 1696, Cardinal Bandino Panciatichi, living in Rome, commissioned Carlo Rainaldi and Francesco Fontana to design a remodeling. The work was forwarded by Antonio Maria Ferri and Paolo Falconieri, who completed the interior in 1697. In 1741 some rooms inside were painted by Giovanni Domenico Ferretti, Vincenzo Meucci and Pietro Anderlini, other rooms were decorated in 1750 by Niccolò Agostino Veracini and Vincenzo Torrigiani. Between 1742-1757, the palace underwent further expansion of the palace directed by Giulio Mannaioni. Around the mid-nineteenth century, the descendants of the Panciatichi moved to a palace in Borgo Pinti, and converted the rooms of the palace into apartments.

In 1910 the property was sold to Cattolica Assicurazioni, then to the National Institute of Insurance (Istituto Nazionale di Assicurazione). Rented in part in 1960 to the Education Authority, the complex was later to house the Regional Council of Tuscany, which still has its headquarters there. To this end, the building was remodeled by Franco Bonaiuti between 1972 and 1973. The palace now is connected to the adjacent Palazzo Capponi Covoni.

At one corner is an aedicule with a Madonna and Child by Desiderio da Settignano (original in the National Museum of the Bargello). At other corners are the coat of arms of the Panciatichi.
