= Treaty of Florence =

1801 Treaty during the War of the Second Coalition

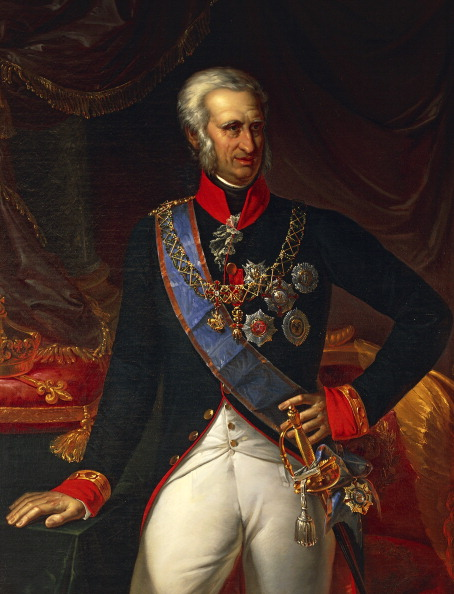
- Ferdinand IV of Naples
- Type: Peace treaty
- Signed: 28 March 1801
- Location: Florence
- Signatories: Napoleon; King Ferdinand

The Treaty of Florence (28 March 1801), which followed the Armistice of Foligno (9 February 1801), brought to an end the war between the French Republic and the Kingdom of Naples, one of the Wars of the French Revolution. Forced by the French military presence, Naples ceded some territories in the Tyrrhenian Sea and accepted French garrisons to their ports on the Adriatic Sea. All Neapolitan harbours were closed to British and Ottoman vessels.

Napoleon was relatively lenient to the defenseless Kingdom of Naples thanks to his need to appease Tsar Paul I of Russia and its allies of the Second League of Armed Neutrality. The Tsar, who was assassinated less than a week before the signing of the treaty, was concerned with the French advance in Italy and had decided to support the King of Naples. The First Consul, wanting to attract the Tsar to his side in the strife in Europe, was forced to allow Ferdinand IV to remain on the throne albeit now as an ally of France.

== Context ==
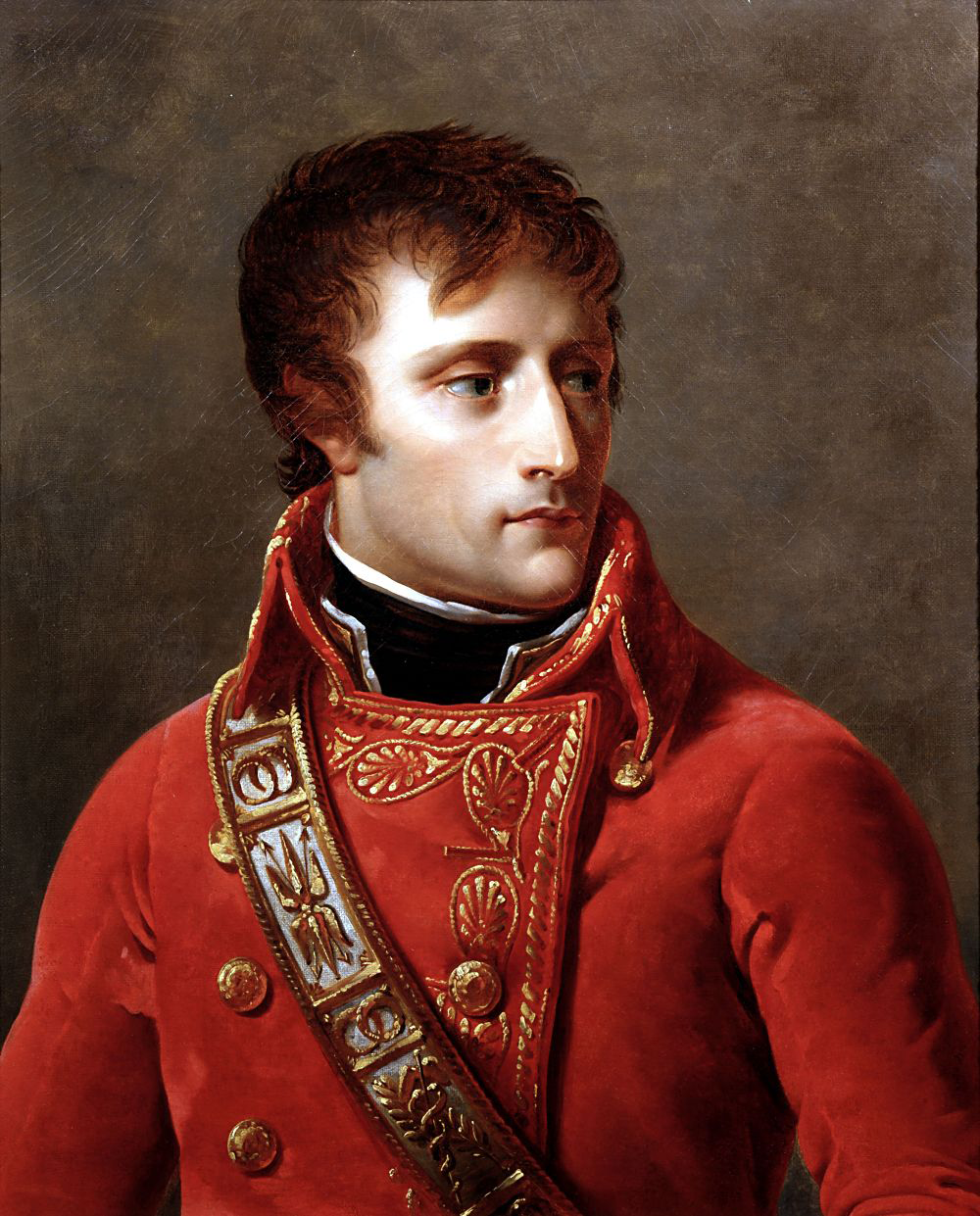
Napoleon

In the early 19th century, France, with Napoleon in charge, was at war against the Second Coalition formed by the Holy Roman Empire, Great Britain, Portugal, the Kingdom of Naples, Russia and the Ottoman Empire. Spain and France remained a military alliance since the signing of the Third Treaty of San Ildefonso in 1800.

After the victories of Napoleon's army in the campaign of 1800 at Marengo, Höchstädt and Hohenlinden, the Holy Roman Empire made peace with France on 9 February 1801 by the Treaty of Lunéville. Naples, which had until Marengo been helped by the Holy Roman Empire, was now at the mercy of the powerful French Army.

Ferdinand IV of Naples was the brother of Charles IV of Spain, but their relationship was no obstacle to the Franco-Spanish alliance. The influence of his wife, Queen Maria Carolina of Austria, and of the Austrian royal family led to the alignment of Naples with the Second Coalition and the with Holy Roman Empire. Maria Carolina was the sister of Marie Antoinette, the queen consort of France. The crown prince of Naples, Francis, was married to the Archduchess of Austria Maria Clementina, the daughter of Emperor Leopold II.

== Agreements ==
=== Armistice of Foligno ===
With the advance of the French Army under General Joachim Murat, Count Roger de Damas, in command of the Neapolitan troops, sent Colonel Micheroux to negotiate a preliminary armistice for one month. The final armistice was signed in Foligno on 9 February, a few days later.

=== Treaty of Florence ===
The final treaty was signed on 28 March in Florence with the mediation of the Russian general Lewaschef, who was sent by the Tsar Paul I at the request of Maria Carolina. The main points of the agreement were:

- King Ferdinand would be restored to the Neapolitan throne.
- Naples would to cede the State of Presidi and its portion of the island of Elba, Porto Longone and the vassal Principality of Piombino to France.
- Neapolitan troops would withdraw from the Papal States.
- Neapolitan ports would be closed to British and Ottoman ships.
- Trading privileges would be granted to France.
- Naples would allow the stationing of French troops, with Neapolitan financial support, on Neapolitan territory for a year the city of Pescara and the province of Terra d'Otranto, including the cities of Brindisi and Otranto.
- Prisoners-of-war on both sides, including the French scientist Déodat Gratet de Dolomieu, would be released, and Naples would amnesty imprisoned and exiled Jacobins.
- The statue Athena of Velletri would be returned to France.

== Effects and aftermath ==
The Principality of Piombino and the State of Presidi were ceded to the Kingdom of Etruria, in exchange for the Spanish colony of Louisiana, as agreed in the Treaty of San Ildefonso of 1800.

In May 1801 the French general Soult with 10,000 troops, occupied the ports of Otranto, Taranto (temporarily) and Brindisi to facilitate communications with the French Army in Egypt. After the signing of peace between France and Russia in October 1801, French troops temporarily evacuated the Neapolitan territory, occupying the country again in 1803 against the threat from the British fleet.

With the Treaty of Florence, together with the Treaties of Lunéville and Badajoz and the Concordat with the Pope and culminating in 1802 with the signing of the Peace of Amiens, there was peace in Europe until 1805, when hostilities would resume in the French war against the Third Coalition.

== See also ==
- Treaty of Florence (1844)

== Sources ==
- The Encyclopedia of World History (2001)

Preceded by Treaty of Lunéville	French Revolution: Revolutionary campaigns Treaty of Florence	Succeeded by Algeciras campaign
