= Giuseppe Fede =

Conte Giuseppe Fede (died 1777) was an Italian nobleman, collector and archaeologist of the 18th century. As early as 1724 he started to buy up parcels of land on the site of Hadrian's Villa at Tivoli (which had become divided up among a multitude of owners) and excavate on them. Like his father, he was a collector-excavator who retained some of the sculptures he excavated for himself whilst releasing others onto the antiquarian market.

He had at least four of the sculptures he found restored by Bartolomeo Cavaceppi before 1768, and Cavaceppi included sculptures found by Fede in his Raccolta.

== See also ==
- Hadrian's Villa
- Bartolomeo Cavaceppi
- History of archaeology
