= Athena of Velletri =

Statue type of Athena, wearing a helmet

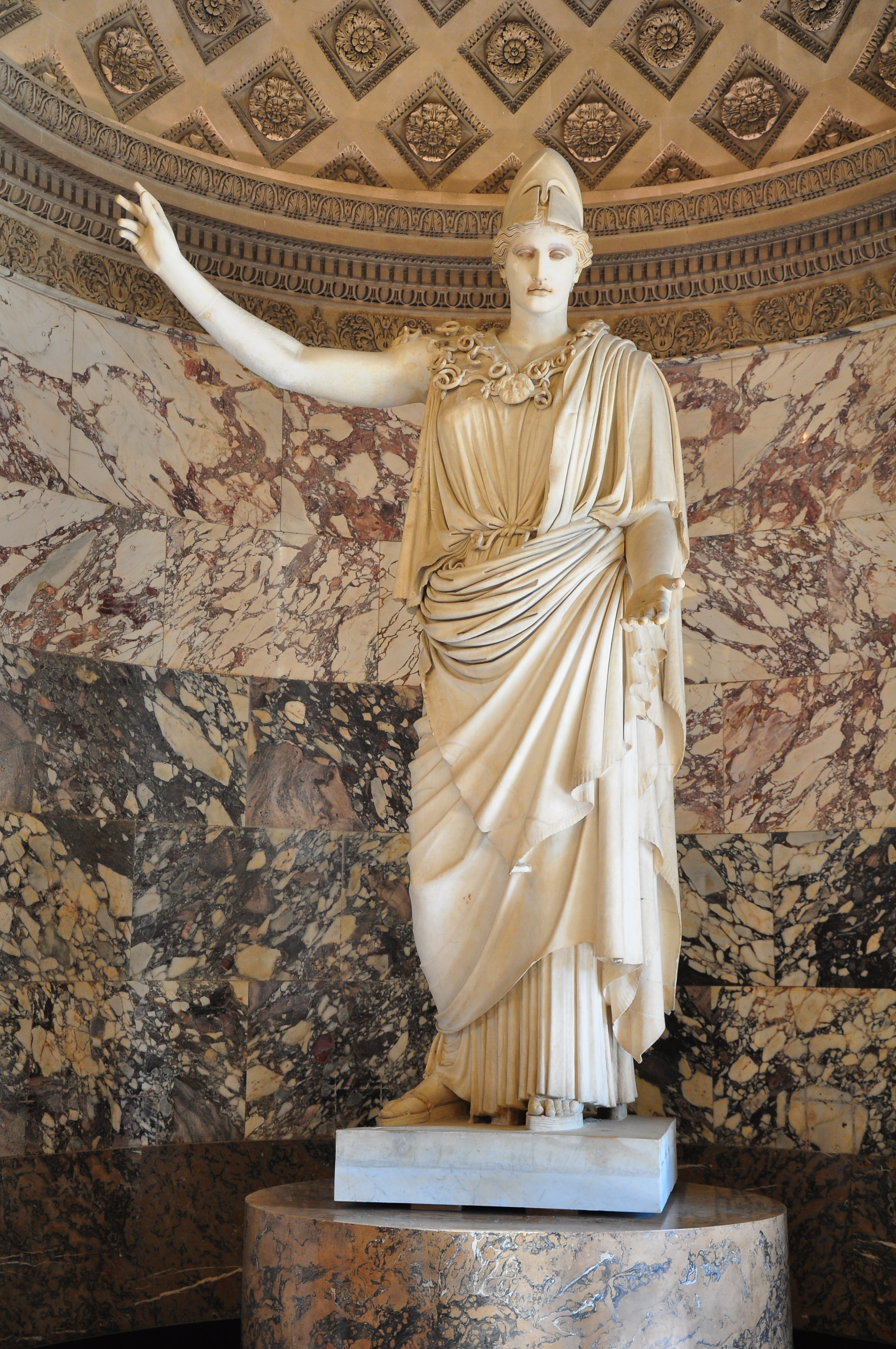
The Athena of Velletri (Louvre)

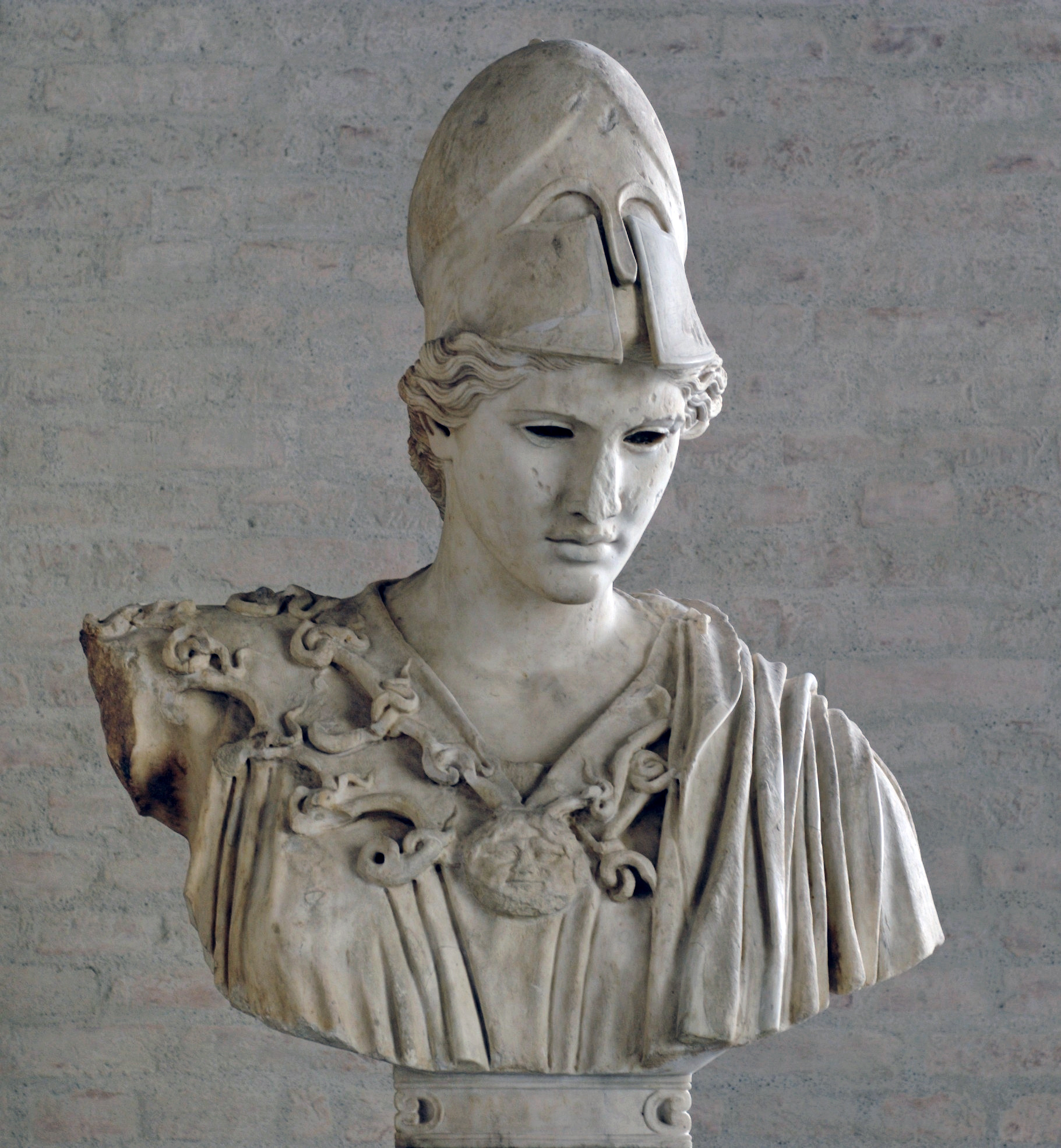
Head of a statue of this type (Glyptothek)

The Athena of Velletri or Velletri Pallas is a type of classical marble statue of Athena, wearing a Corinthian helmet.

== Original ==
All statues of this type are 1st century Roman copies of a lost Greek bronze, possibly a bronze of c. 430 BC by Kresilas. The oval face and the sharpness of the eyebrow ridge, nose and eyes mirror those of the bust of the helmeted Pericles at British Museum. That bust is identified with the statue of Pericles that Pliny the Elder (Natural History, XXXIV, 25) attributes to Kresilas and that Pausanias (I, 28, 2) records as sited on the acropolis in the 2nd century. This parallel gives us a date and author for this bronze Athena.

This replaces an old identification of the type's original with the cult statue by Alcamenes in the Temple of Hephaestus on the Athenian agora.

Plaster casts of the sculpture (probably taken from the original) have been found in excavations of a Roman copyist's workshop at Baiae, and these casts show that Kresilas's bronze was of the same dimensions as the Louvre copy, which is 3.05 metres.

== Louvre copy ==
Many ancient copies of the bronze have been found (and the Baiae find suggests industrial-scale production of them), but the most famous is the 3.05 m (10 ft) high example found in the ruins of a Roman villa in a vineyard near Velletri in 1797. This example is now in the Louvre, with Accession number is Ma 464 (MR 281). It has traces of red colour in the hair and around the eyes and mouth, a preparatory layer for a full polychromatic scheme.

Upon rediscovery, it was purchased by Vincenzo Pacetti, who added the peak of the helmet, the straight forearm, the hands, the feet, the snakes, and a section of the cloak, and polished the overall surface. He then sold it to the French Directory, which transported it to Rome, where it was soon seized by Neapolitan armies when they briefly held the city from November to December 1798 during the opening stages of the War of the Second Coalition. France then regained it in the Treaty of Florence (28 March 1801), and it was displayed at the Louvre from December 1803 onwards.
