= Andrea Barbiani =

Italian painter

Andrea Barbiani (1708–1779) was an Italian painter of the 18th century, mainly active in Ravenna and Rimini. He painted in the style of Cesare Pronti. He was the nephew of the painter Giovanni Battista Barbiani.

== Works ==
- The Four Evangelists in the vault of the cathedral of Ravenna.
- La Madonna col bambino e Santi (Saint Mary with her Baby and Saints), Oil on canvas, Forlì, Pinacoteca civica.
- Altarpiece, Santa Maria del Suffragio, Ravenna
