= Castor and Pollux (Prado) =

Ancient Roman sculptural group

Castor and Pollux (San Ildefonso Group)
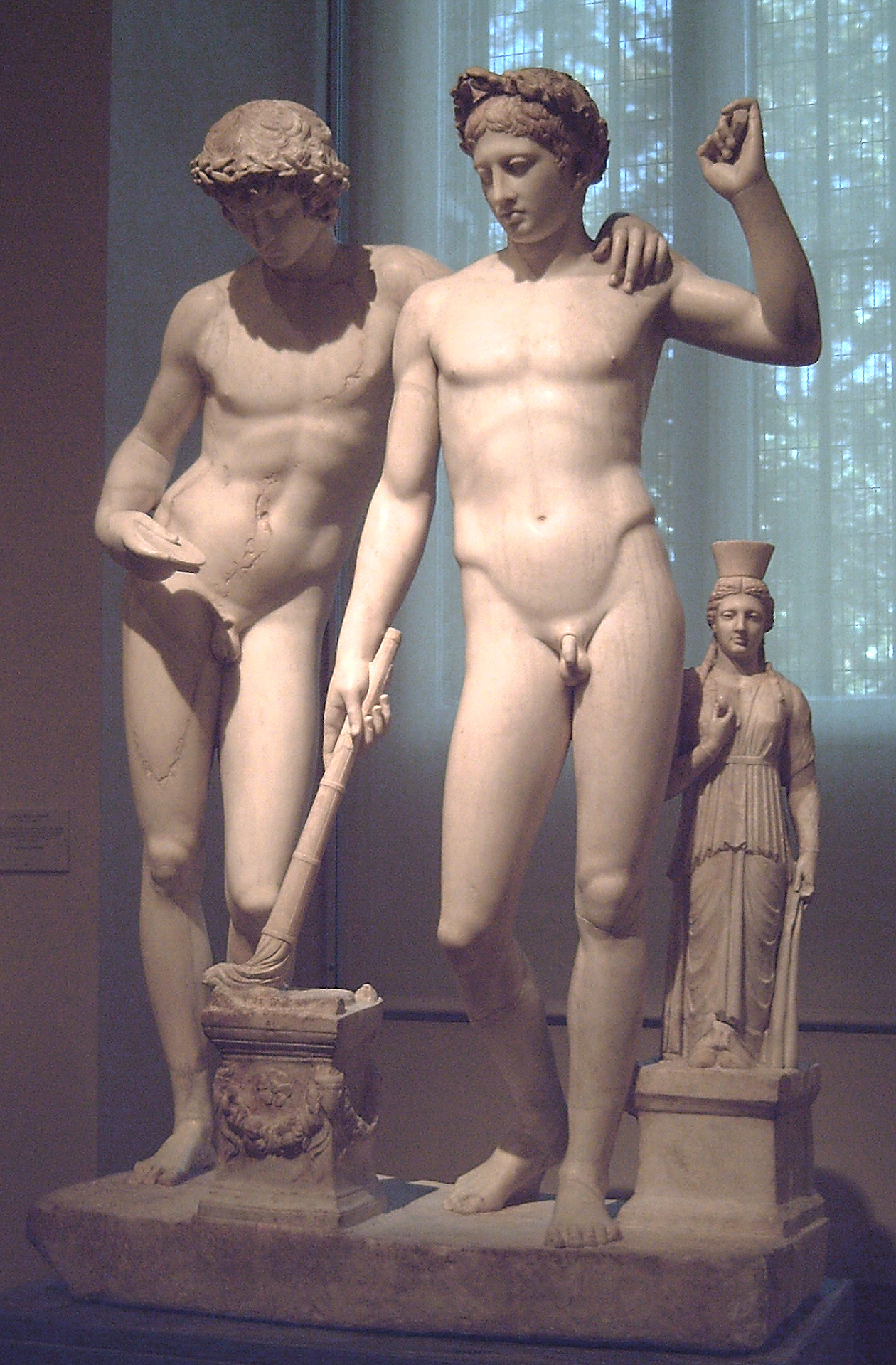
- Year: 1st century AD
- Type: White marble
- Dimensions: 161 cm (63 in)
- Location: Museo del Prado, Madrid

The Castor and Pollux group (also known as the San Ildefonso Group, after San Ildefonso in Segovia, Spain, the location of the palace of La Granja at which it was kept until 1839) is an ancient Roman sculptural group of the 1st century AD, now in the Museo del Prado, Madrid.

Drawing on 5th- and 4th-century BC Greek sculptures in the Praxitelean tradition, such as the Apollo Sauroctonos and the "Westmacott Ephebe", and without copying any single known Greek sculpture, it shows two idealised nude youths, both wearing laurel wreaths. The young men lean against each other, and to their left on an altar is a small female figure, usually interpreted as a statue of a female divinity. She holds a sphere, variously interpreted as an egg or pomegranate. The group is 161 cm high and is now accepted as portraying Castor and Pollux.

== Identification ==
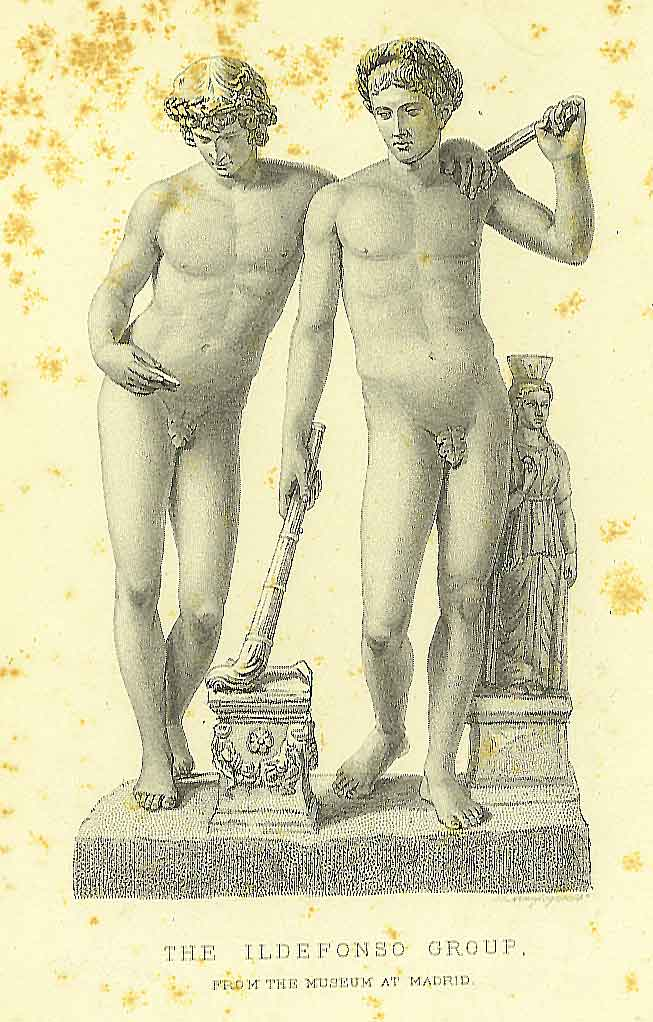
Engraving of San Ildefonso Group.

The lefthand figure was originally headless but was restored in the 17th century, the heyday of interpretive restorations, by Ippolito Buzzi, when the sculpture was in the collection of Cardinal Ludovico Ludovisi, using a Hadrianic-era (ca. 130) bust of Antinous of the Apollo-Antinous type from another statue. The identification of the figures inspired many choices of male pairs during the 17th and 18th centuries. During the 19th century, it became known as "Antinous and Hadrian's genius", to get over the problem of their both being youths, whereas ahistorically it was an important feature of Antinous' relationship with Hadrian that Antinous was a youthful eromenos and Hadrian an elder erastes. Alternatively "Antinous and a sacrificial daemon" was suggested, in reference to the myth that Antinous had killed himself as a sacrifice to lengthen Hadrian's life), or simply as Antinous and Hadrian pledging their fidelity to one another.

Other alternative identifications in the past have included:

- Hypnos and Thanatos, interpreting the sphere as a pomegranate, symbol of death
- Corydon and Alexis
- Winckelmann's suggestion of Orestes and Pylades offering a sacrifice to the statue of goddess Artemis, which they wanted to seize, or in front of the tomb of murdered Agamemnon. Winckelmann was the first to publish the sculpture, in Monumenti Antichi Inediti 1767, pp xxi–xxii.

All these identifications are now thought to be erroneous and simply due to the figure's restoration as Antinous: the group is now accepted as Castor and Pollux, offering a sacrifice to Persephone. Such an identification is based on the right-hand figure, who holds two torches, one downturned (on a flower-wreathed altar) and one upturned (behind his back), and on identifying the woman's sphere as an egg (like that from which the Dioscuri were born). The interpretation was supported by Goethe, who owned a cast of the group.

Some scholars assert that the statute group was originally created by the ancient sculptor Pasiteles.

== Style ==
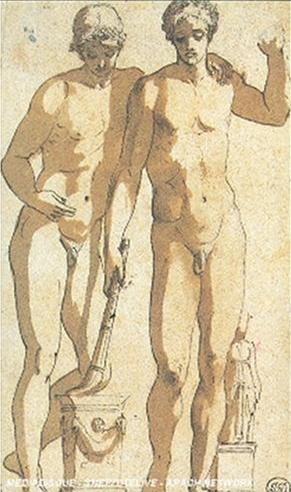
Poussin's pen and brown-wash sketch of this group (c. 1628).

The work is an outstanding example of neo-Attic eclecticism frequent at the end of the Roman Republic and during the first decades of the Roman Empire, around the Augustan period, combining two different aesthetic streams: whilst the right-hand youth is Polyclitean, the left-hand one is in a softer, more sensual and Praxitelean style.

== History ==
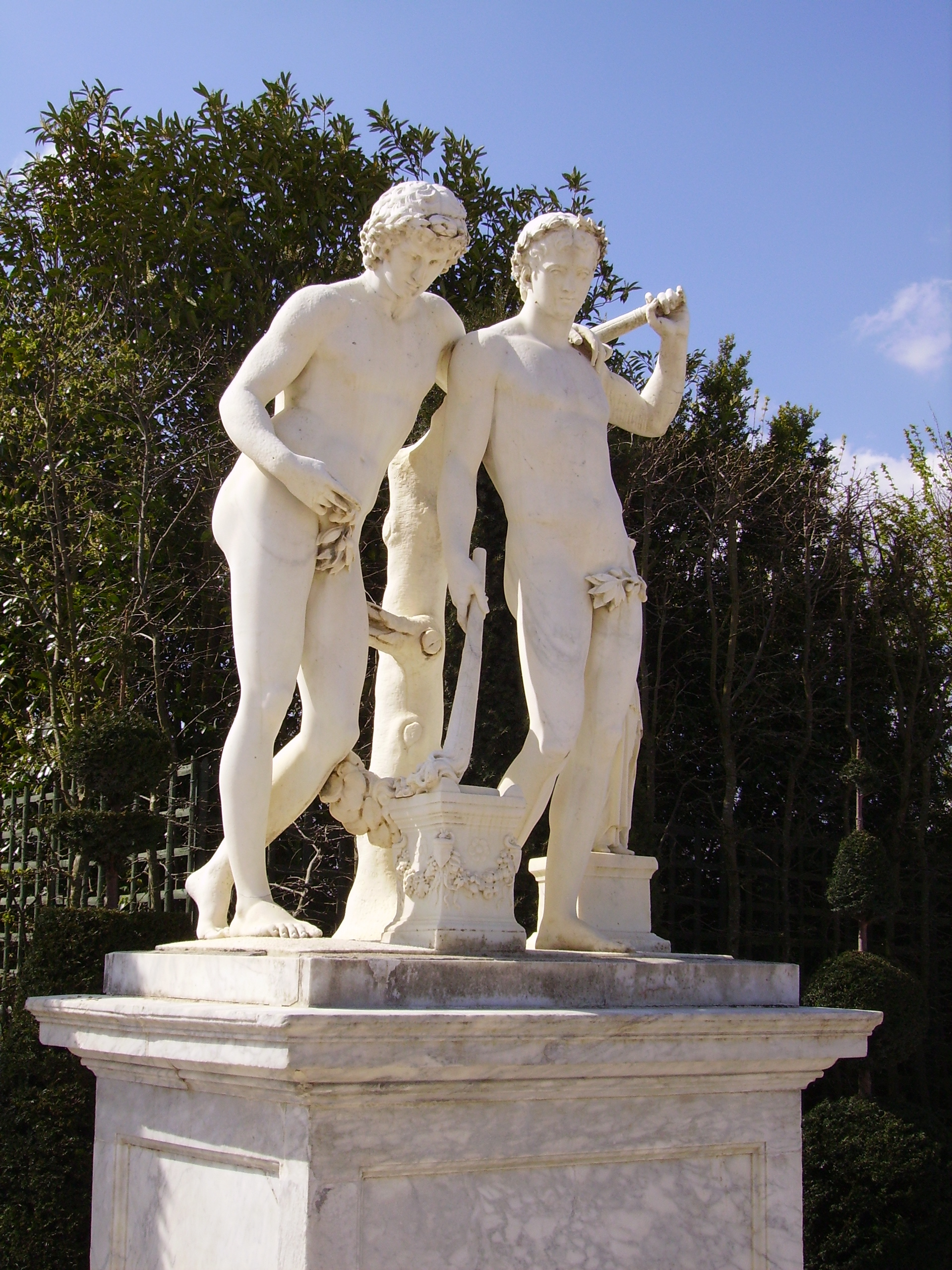
The marble version sculpted by Antoine Coysevox, 1687–1706, for the parterre de Latone of Versailles

Its find site is unknown, but by 1623 it was in the Ludovisi collection at the Villa Ludovisi in Rome, where the Ludovisi restorer, the sculptor Ippolito Buzzi (1562–1634), restored it that year. Nicolas Poussin (illustration, left) saw it in the Ludovisi collection or in that of Cardinal Camillo Massimo, who owned it later. Poussin's sketch was not intended as a faithful representation of the sculpture, but to be stored and referred to, as part of his visual repertory of antiquities, which was extensive and which made its presence felt in most of his paintings. In his sketch of the San Ildefonso group Poussin has made minor adjustments to the poses, but his major change is in transforming the lithe adolescents into more muscular athletes or heroes.

Its reputation soon spread and shortly after 1664 it was acquired by Queen Christina of Sweden to join the large art collection that she gathered during her stay in Rome. The ancient sculptures in that collection were transferred to the Odescalchi who, in 1724, offered this group to Philip V of Spain. Philip's second wife Isabella Farnese (from the Farnese of Parma, which had a history of sculpture collecting) acquired it at above-market price for him and had it sent to the Palace of La Granja de San Ildefonso (Segovia). From there it came into the Prado (catalogue number Catalogue Nr. E.28).

== Copies ==
The erroneous identification with Antinous generated high interest in the sculpture, with large numbers of copies being produced, largely made in Italy and Northern Europe and based on plaster casts rather than made in Spain and based on the original there. These inevitably stoked the interest by obscuring the fact that the Antinous head was in fact a restoration, instead smoothing the two into a meaningful whole (as did the casts on which they were based).

Town/city	Place	Medium	Artist	Notes
Potsdam	Park of Sanssouci, near Charlottenhof Palace.	Marble	Francesco Menghi.	It first stood along the grove near the hippodrome; since 1885 it has been at its present location. It has recently been damaged.
London	Victoria & Albert Museum.	Marble	Joseph Nollekens in Rome (signed in 1767), from a cast.	Made for Thomas Anson; soon after its completion it was sent to his residence at Shugborough Hall (Staffordshire), where it stood until 1842, when it was sold for £320 3s (three times the amount any of the actual antiquities raised) to Mr H. Soden, whose son-in-law bequeathed it to the V&A Museum in 1940, where it is today exhibited in Room 50 (the British Galleries) under Inv. Nr. A.59-1940. At Shugboropugh it is represented by a plaster cast.
Versailles	Gardens.	Marble	Antoine Coysevox	The artist worked slowly on this work, at intervals between 1687 and 1706, and signed it only in 1712. First exhibited in the Palais du Louvre, then, in 1712 in the gardens of Versailles where it is still today. "Les guides font remarquer la beauté des adolescents nus et couronnés de fleurs" (Pierre de Nolhac, 1913).
Château de Sceaux (Hauts-de-Seine, France)	Gardens of the château.	Marble		This is an early and rather free interpretation of the Ildefonso group, probably based on an etching or drawing; at 2.5 m high, it is also considerably larger than the original. This group dates to the first half of the 17th century; it is carved in stone and its back has never been completely finished. The group shows today severe degradation.
Berlin	Charlottenburg	Bronze	Christoph Heinrich Fischer	Fischer, active in Berlin in the first half of the 19th century, sculpted it in 1833, since when it has remained in the Charlottenburg gardens. Restored in 1998.
Berlin	Glienicke Castle (originally on top of a fountain, now in the inner court of the castle).	Bronze		1828, in a set-up inspired by the Weimar copy.
Bad Freienwalde	(previously used to decorate a chimney-piece in the schloss, and now standing in the gardens, in front of the castle).	Cast iron		Manufactured in 1795 by the foundry of Lauchhammer, probably copied from the plaster cast figuring in the casts collection assembled by the painter Anton Rafael Mengs [1728-1779] and donated to the Albertinum, Dresden in 1785.
Weimar		Cast iron		Manufactured by the foundry of Lauchhammer. Displayed from 1796 near the Holzhalle of the Rotes Schloß (Red Castle). In 1824, the architect Clemens Wenzel Coudray [1775–1845] had it moved and set on a fountain in front of the Burgplatz, where it still stands today. Restored in 1994/95.
Weimar	Goethe House.	Plaster cast.		Acquired by Goethe in 1812 and now on the landing of the first floor. Goethe wrote about this group : "Diese beyden Epheben waren mir immer höchst angenehm"
Dresden	Porzellansammlung, Inv. N° PE 434.	Biscuit porcelain	Christian Gottfried Jüchtzer [1752–1812]	c. 35 cm high. The artist produced several exemplars of "Castor and Pollux" during his career in Meißen. Exhibited in the Japanisches Palais in the 19th century, today in the Zwinger.
Berlin	Kunstgewerbemuseum, Room V.	Meissen porcelain	Christian Gottfried Jüchtzer	ca. 1790, about 35 cm high.
London	British Museum	Meissen porcelain	Christian Gottfried Jüchtzer	Inv. N° MME 2001, 3–4, 1. Dated 1788–89, acquired in 2001. Exhibited in Room 47, Showcase 1.
