= Giovanni Battista Barbiani =

Italian painter

Giovanni Battista Barbiani (1593–1650) was an Italian painter of the Baroque period, active in Ravenna. Among his works are altarpieces of St. Andrew and St. Joseph for the Franciscan church. For the dome of the chapel of the Madonna del Sudore in the Cathedral of Ravenna, he painted a fresco of the Assumption of the Virgin. He painted a ' St. Peter' in Sant' Agata in Ravenna. He painted in the style of Bartolomeo Cesi. Along with Cesare Pronti, he painted in the church of San Romualdo (designed by Luca Danesi, of the Camaldolese Abbey, now home to the Biblioteca Classense of Ravenna. The grand corridor in the Abbey is also frescoed by Barbiani with famous benedictine and camaldolese monks. His nephew Andrea Barbiani was also a painter in Ravenna and Rimini.
