= Paolo Falconieri =

Italian architect, painter and mathematician

- Anonymous portrait of Paolo Falconieri, late 17th century, Fondazione Zeri, Bologna
- Born: 24 March 1634; Rome, Papal States
- Died: 13 March 1704 (aged 69); Rome, Papal States
- Burial place: San Giovanni dei Fiorentini
- Other name: Fronimo Epiro
- Occupations: Architect, painter and mathematician
- Relatives: Orazio Falconieri (uncle)

Paolo Falconieri (24 March 1634 – 13 March 1704) was an Italian architect, painter and mathematician, from a noble family of Florence, whose intellectual interests were wide-ranging, one of the virtuosi of the first scientific century. He was a member of the court of Cosimo III de' Medici, Grand Duke of Tuscany, and a prominent member of the Florentine Accademia del Cimento, selected in 1668 to accompany the secretary Lorenzo Magalotti in presenting to the Royal Society in London and to Charles II, copies of the newly printed reports of experimental science in Florence, Saggi di Naturali Esperienze.

== Biography ==
Paolo Falconieri was born in Rome on 24 March 1634 to Piero di Paolo Falconieri and Dianora di Francesco Del Bene. He was baptised on 31 March at the parish of Santa Caterina della Rota. His father, Piero, was the brother of Orazio, who had made the Roman branch of the Florentine Falconieri family wealthy through a lucrative salt monopoly. Piero lived in the sumptuous residence that his brother had purchased on Via Giulia, which was later expanded and embellished according to Borromini's designs.

Falconieri soon became a prominent figure within Roman and Tuscan cultural circles. His rise was facilitated by the substantial wealth amassed by his uncle Orazio; the significant Roman connections of his other uncle, Cardinal Lelio Falconieri; and above all, the position held by his brother Ottavio (1636–1675). Ottavio served as an artistic correspondent in Rome for Cardinal Leopoldo de' Medici, and was a member of influential literary and scientific circles, such as the academy promoted and supported by Christina, Queen of Sweden.

Unlike his brothers, Ottavio and Francesco (1627–1674), who were both members of the clergy, Paolo remained a layman. He began his political career as a courtier at the Medici court. The scientist and man of letters Lorenzo Magalotti played a decisive role in his political career. A member of the Accademia del Cimento, Magalotti was a leading proponent of the programme for scientific renewal promoted by Cardinal Leopoldo de' Medici. It was through his friendship with Magalotti that Falconieri was able to gain entry to the Medici court, first as a Roman correspondent for Cardinal Leopoldo and subsequently as a gentleman-in-waiting to Prince Cosimo.

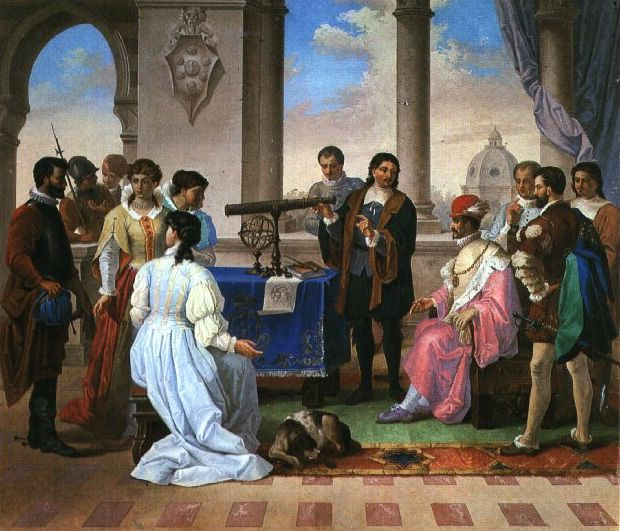
Eustachio Divini presents his telescope to Ferdinando II de' Medici (Mariano Piervittori, 1884)

Between late 1664 and early 1665, Falconieri was tasked by Magalotti with overseeing a series of experiments involving lenses and optical instruments created by the renowned opticians Giuseppe Campani and Eustachio Divini in Rome. Between 1668 and 1669, he accompanied Prince Cosimo on a journey through Spain, Portugal, Holland, England and France, again in the company of Magalotti. During this trip, he showcased his artistic and literary expertise and established significant connections with European scholars. In Holland he became acquainted with Marquard Gude, Charles de Saint-Évremond and, above all, Nicolaas Heinsius, with whom he maintained a long correspondence. In England he established close ties with the English writer and radical politician Sir Henry Neville.

In 1670, Cosimo III appointed Falconieri valet de chambre. Bolstered by this important recognition, he became a key figure in Rome during the first half of the 1670s, serving as the main point of contact for the new Grand Duke’s artistic policies. From 1672 onwards, he oversaw the training of four young Tuscan artists who had been sent to Rome by the Accademia delle Arti del Disegno to further their studies under Ciro Ferri and Ercole Ferrata. At the same time, he continued to advise on the acquisition of paintings, drawings and antiquities to expand the Grand Ducal collections. Thanks to his mediation, the Grand Duke acquired significant works such as Gian Lorenzo Bernini's self-portrait (Florence, Uffizi) and Michelangelo’s Deposition (Florence Cathedral). Falconieri also supervised several significant projects commissioned by the Grand Duke, including the new chapel of St. Maria Maddalena de’ Pazzi in the choir of the church of San Frediano in Cestello (begun by Ciro Ferri in 1674); a decorative scheme for the dome of the Cappella dei Principi in San Lorenzo; and the construction of the convent of St. Peter of Alcantara near the Villa Medicea L'Ambrogiana.

Following the deaths of his brothers, Francesco in 1674 and Ottavio in 1675, he requested a release from his court duties from the Grand Duke in order to attend to family affairs. Having secured this release, along with a substantial pension, he was able to devote the final stage of his life to his artistic and literary pursuits. As well as continuing in his role as artistic consultant to the Grand Duke from Rome, he was able to pursue his interests as an amateur architect more actively. Between 1675 and 1678, he advised on the renovation of Cardinal Bandino Panciatici's Florentine palace. In 1681, he presented Cosimo III with a plan for enlarging Palazzo Pitti. The plan, part of a series of proposals for the expansion and embellishment of the palace developed throughout the seventeenth century, is described and praised at length by Filippo Baldinucci and depicted in a lunette at the Museo degli Argenti in Florence. Of particular interest is its treatment of the square in front of the palace, organised into two distinct levels connected by a dramatic pavilion featuring two semicircular ramps arranged in a 'scissor' configuration to allow carriage access to the palace, preceded by two circular basins. Although this design was never realised, it nonetheless influenced subsequent proposals, most notably those of Ignazio Pellegrini (1715–1790).

The façade of Palazzo Pucci, designed by Falconieri around 1690

Falconieri also designed the new monumental façade, constructed around 1690, that joined and unified the palaces of the Marquises Orazio Roberto and Giovan Lorenzo Pucci. On the same street, opposite the Palazzo Pucci, the new façade of Palazzo Incontri was also likely built based on Falconieri's design.

Later in his life, Falconieri devoted himself to scholarly and literary pursuits. A member of the Florentine Accademia della Crusca since 1663, he was among the first members of the Accademia Fisicomatematica, established by Monsignor Giovanni Ciampini in 1677. In 1691, he joined the Pontifical Academy of Arcadia under the name Fronimo Epiro. Falconieri was a well-respected figure in scientific and academic circles of his time. He was a close friend of Vincenzo Viviani and Francesco Redi, who addressed his Lettera intorno all'invenzione degli occhiali (Florence, 1678) to him. Building on his relationship with the Dutch publisher Blaeu, he collaborated with Viviani on an unsuccessful project to publish a complete edition of Galileo Galilei's works in Holland. In addition to his renown within literary circles, Falconieri received significant recognition from the papal court in later life, including an appointment as a chierico di camera (cleric of the papal chamber) by Pope Clement XI. Falconieri died in Rome on 13 March 1704 and was buried in the vault built by his family in the choir of the church of San Giovanni dei Fiorentini.

== Art collection ==
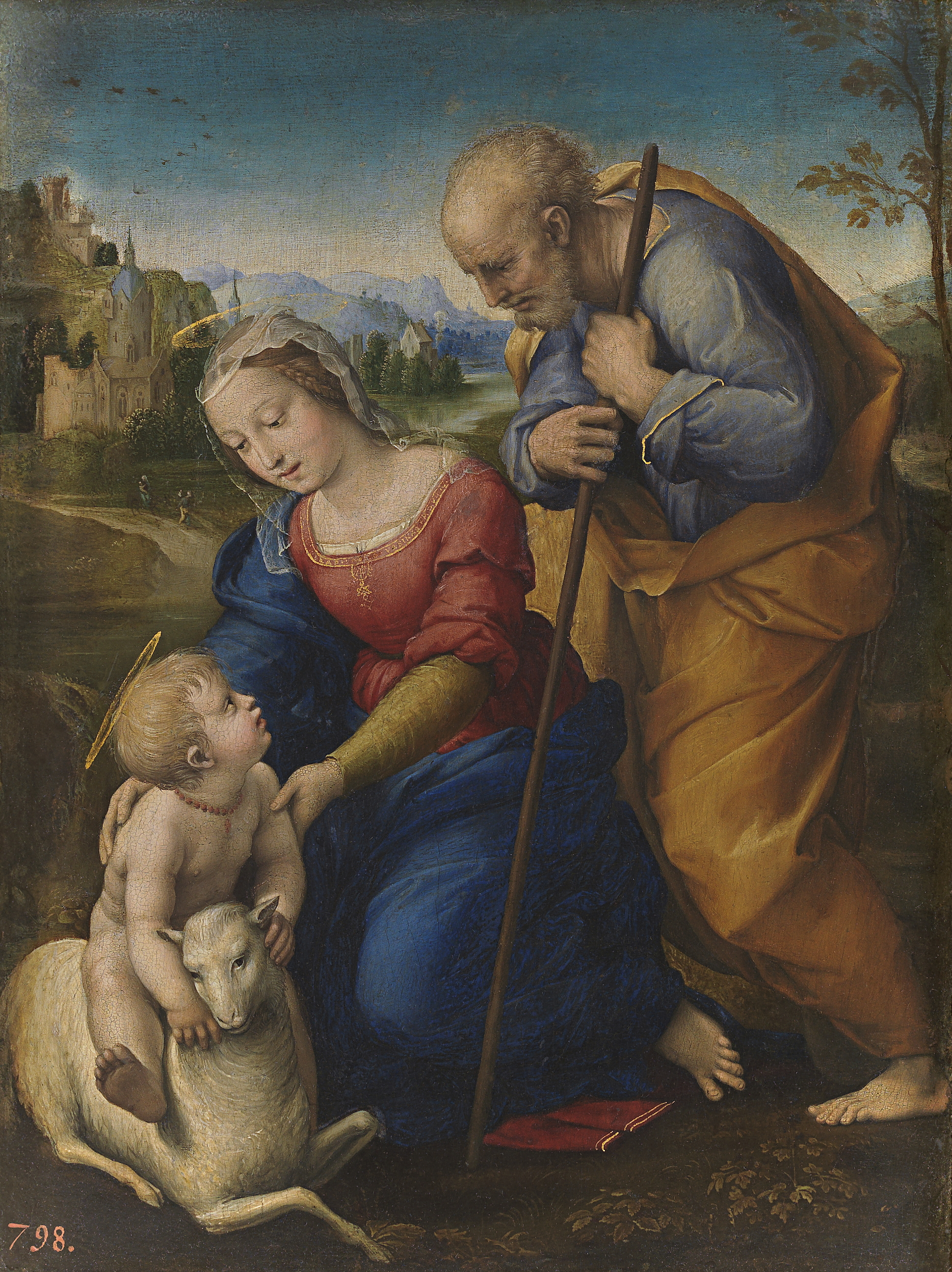
Raphael's Holy Family with a Lamb, once part of the Falconieri Collection, Museo del Prado, Madrid.

Falconieri amassed an extensive library and a vast collection of paintings in his Roman townhouse on Via Giulia. Thanks to his connections, he was able to acquire significant paintings at relatively modest prices. He purchased several works from the prestigious Ludovisi Collection, sold by the Ludovisi family in the late 17th century. In 1669 Falconieri was reported to have bought 'certe pitture per pochissimi denari' (some paintings for a mere pittance) from the Villa Ludovisi at Porta Pinciana. His collection included Renaissance masterpieces such as Raphael's Holy Family with a Lamb, as well as works by renowned 17th-century landscape painters such as Poussin, Lorrain, Dughet and Salvator Rosa. It also featured pieces by lesser-known artists, including the Flemish vedutisti Livio Mehus and Jacob de Heusch. When the Roman-Florentine line of the Falconieri family became extinct in 1865, the collection was dispersed.

== Works ==
- Laura Giovannini, ed. (1984). Lettere di Ottavio Falconieri a Leopoldo de' Medici (in Italian). Florence: EDAM.

== Bibliography ==
- Crinò, Anna Maria (1957). Fatti e figure del Seicento Anglo-Toscano (in Italian). Florence: Olschki. ISBN 978-8822215833.
- Garas, Klara (1967). "The Ludovisi Collection of Pictures in 1633-I". The Burlington Magazine. 109 (770): 287–91. JSTOR 875301.
- Crinò, Anna Maria (1968). "Introduzione". Un principe di Toscana in Inghilterra e in Irlanda nel 1669. Relazione ufficiale del viaggio di Cosimo de' Medici tratta dal «giornale» di L. Magalotti (in Italian). Rome: Edizioni di Storia e Letteratura. pp. XIV, XXV. ISBN 978-8884989611.
- Prinz, Wolfram (1971). Die Sammlung der Selbstbildnisse in den Uffizien (in German). Vol. I. Berlin: Mann. pp. 85–89, 113–116, 176–177.
- Chiarini De Anna, Gloria (1975). "Leopoldo de' Medici e la sua raccolta di disegni nel 'Carteggio d'artisti' dell'Archivio di Stato di Firenze". Paragone (in Italian). XXVI (307): 38–64.
- Righini Bonelli, Maria Luisa; Van Helden, Albert (1981). "Divini and Campani: a forgotten chapter in the history of the Accademia del Cimento". Annali dell'Istituto e del Museo di Storia della Scienza. VI (1): 3–176. doi:10.1163/221058781X00015.
- Goldberg, Edward L. (2003). "Falconieri family". Grove Art Online. Oxford University Press. doi:10.1093/gao/9781884446054.article.T027423.
- Frascarelli, Dalma (2011). "«Cercando quadri». Paolo Falconieri (1634-1704) tra artisti, mercanti e collezionisti". In Giulia Aurigemma (ed.). Dal Razionalismo al Rinascimento. Per i quaranta anni di studi di Silvia Danesi Squarzina (in Italian). Rome: Campisano Editore. pp. 396–403. ISBN 978-88-88168-84-5.
- Frascarelli, Dalma (14 January 2014). "Falconieri, ossessione quadreria". Il manifesto (in Italian).
- Mirto, Alfonso (2026). "Paolo Falconieri: lettere a Vincenzio Viviani". Galilæana: Studies in Renaissance & Early Modern Science. 23 (1): 395–420. doi:10.57617/gal-89.
