= Santa Maria del Suffragio, Ravenna =

Church building in Ravenna, Italy

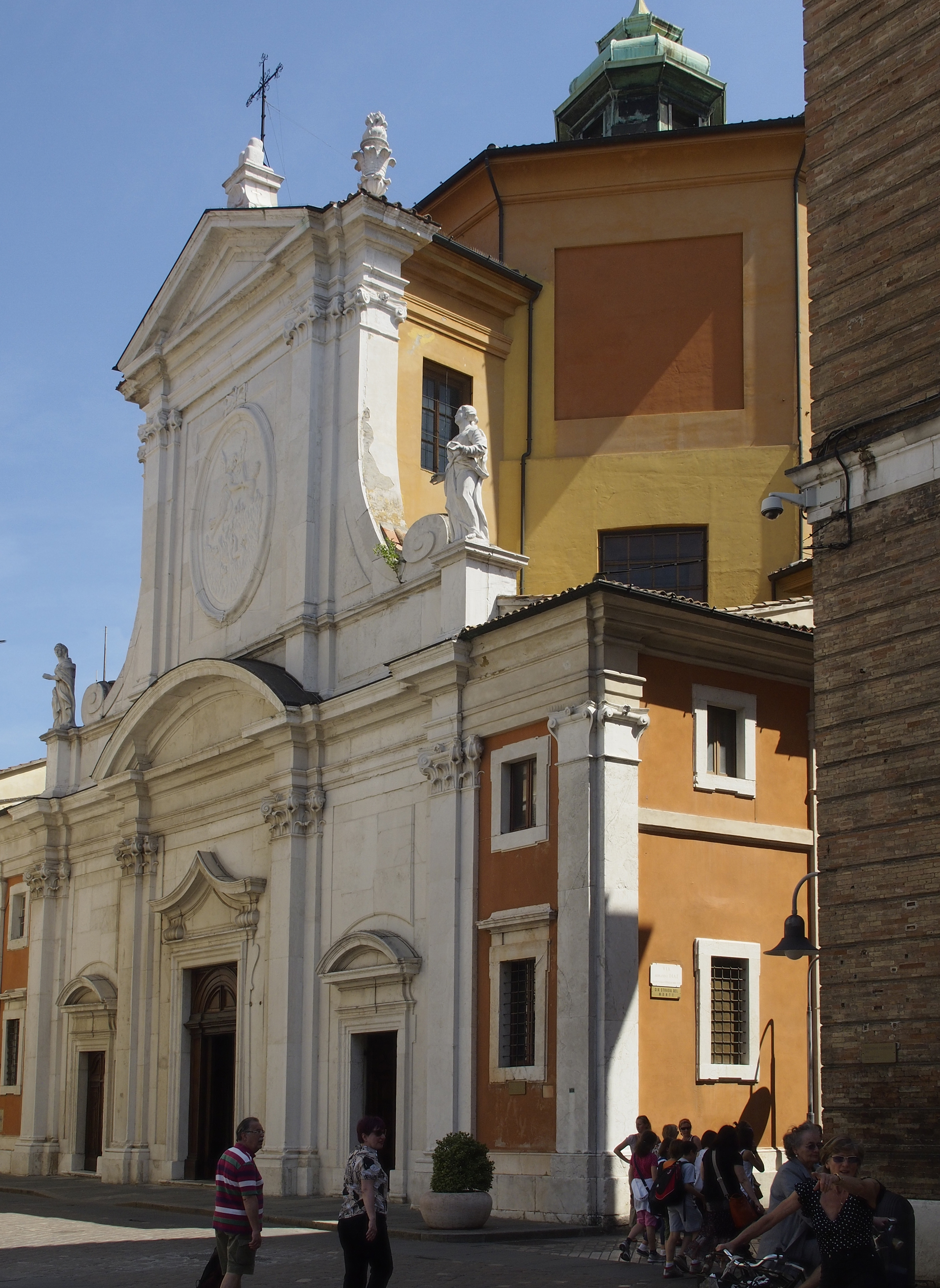
Church of Santa Maria del Suffragio (Intercession) in Ravenna (consecrated 1728)

Santa Maria del Suffragio is a Late-Baroque-style, Roman Catholic church located on Via Serafino Ferruzzi in Ravenna, region of Emilia Romagna, Italy.

The church was designed by Francesco Fontana, son of Carlo Fontana, and erected between 1701 and 1728. The church was commissioned by the Confraternity of Beata Vergine dei Suffragi. The layout of the church is octagonal. Antonio Martinetti sculpted the eight stucco statues of the inside. The main altarpiece is by Andrea Barbiani. The statues and bas-reliefs of the façade are by Celio and Giovanni Toschini.
