= Vincenzo Pacetti =

Italian sculptor (1746–1820)

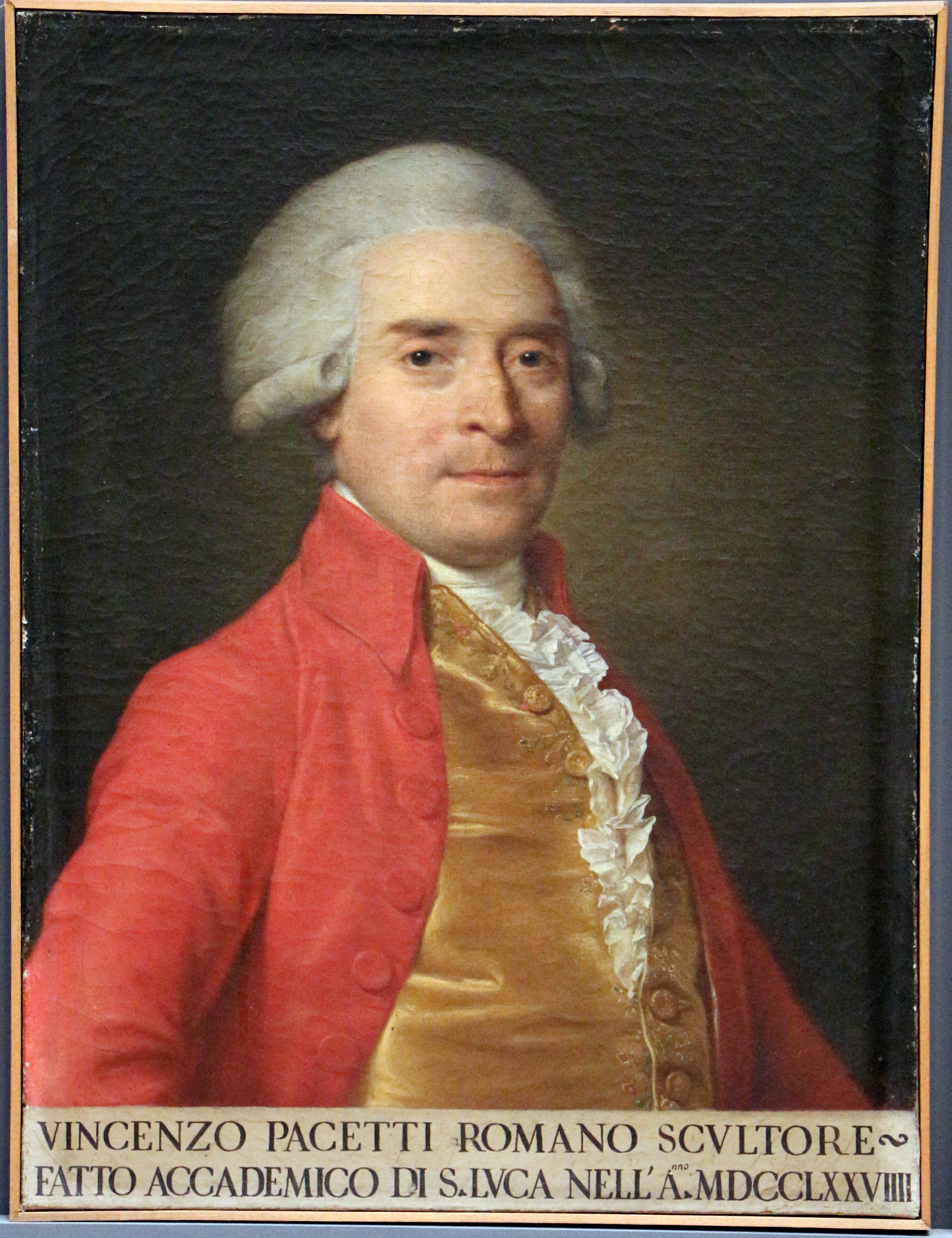
- Portrait of Vincenzo Pacetti by Anton von Maron, oil on canvas, Accademia di San Luca, Rome
- Born: 3 April 1746; Castel Bolognese
- Died: 28 July 1820 (aged 74); Rome

Vincenzo Pacetti (1746–1820) was an Italian sculptor and restorer from Castel Bolognese, particularly active in collecting and freely restoring and completing classical sculptures such as the Barberini Faun (1799 – now in the Glyptothek, Munich)— his most famous work— the Hope Dionysus (now in the Metropolitan Museum of Art) and the Athena of Velletri (1797 – now in the Louvre) and selling them on to rich collectors as finished artefacts. He was the brother of Camillo Pacetti.

== Biography ==
Vincenzo Pacetti was born in 1746. He studied at the Accademia del Nudo and then trained in the studio of the sculptor-restorer, Pietro Pacili, 1766–72, taking over Pacili's studio at the elder sculptor's death.

As an independent sculptor he was accepted into the Accademia di San Luca, presenting his portrait (illustration) and serving as director, a testament to his reputation. Bartolomeo Cavaceppi, another leading sculptor-restorer esteemed Pacetti enough to make him executor of his will.

From the Barberini, Pacetti was promised the purchase of a cache of Roman sculptures and fragments in 1799, among which prominently figured the Barberini Faun. He removed earlier restorations and sculpted a new right leg in marble, but the members of the Barberini family withdrew their offer of sale, and Pacetti was reimbursed the sum of 2000 zecchini.

As the favoured sculptor-restorer for Prince Marcantonio Borghese, he also produced many reliefs and stucchi on mythological themes for the Sala degli Imperatori (of which "The goat Amanthea" and "Perseus freeing Andromeda" are most notable) and the room housing Bernini's Aeneas and Anchises and Apollo and Daphne, both at the Galleria Borghese. Other works of his are in San Salvatore in Lauro, Santo Spirito in Sassia, Santi Michele e Magno, and the Palazzo Carpegna.

In the latter end of his career his most important patron was Lucien Bonaparte, for whom he supplied plaster casts of famous antique sculptures for his villa at Canino.

He died in Rome. His diary covering the years 1773–1803, and correspondence are important primary resources for the Roman art market of his day.

== Sources ==
- Piva, Chiara (2014). "PACETTI, Vincenzo". Dizionario Biografico degli Italiani (in Italian). Vol. 80: Ottone–Pansa. Rome: Istituto dell'Enciclopedia Italiana. ISBN 978-88-12-00032-6.
- Italian artists (in Italian)
- Nancy Ramage, "Vincenzo Pacetti and Luciano Bonaparte: The Restorer and his Patron," in Janet Burnett Grossman, Jerry Podany, and Marion True (ed.s), History of Restoration of Ancient Stone Sculptures (The Getty Museum, 2003).
