= Francesco Fontana (architect) =

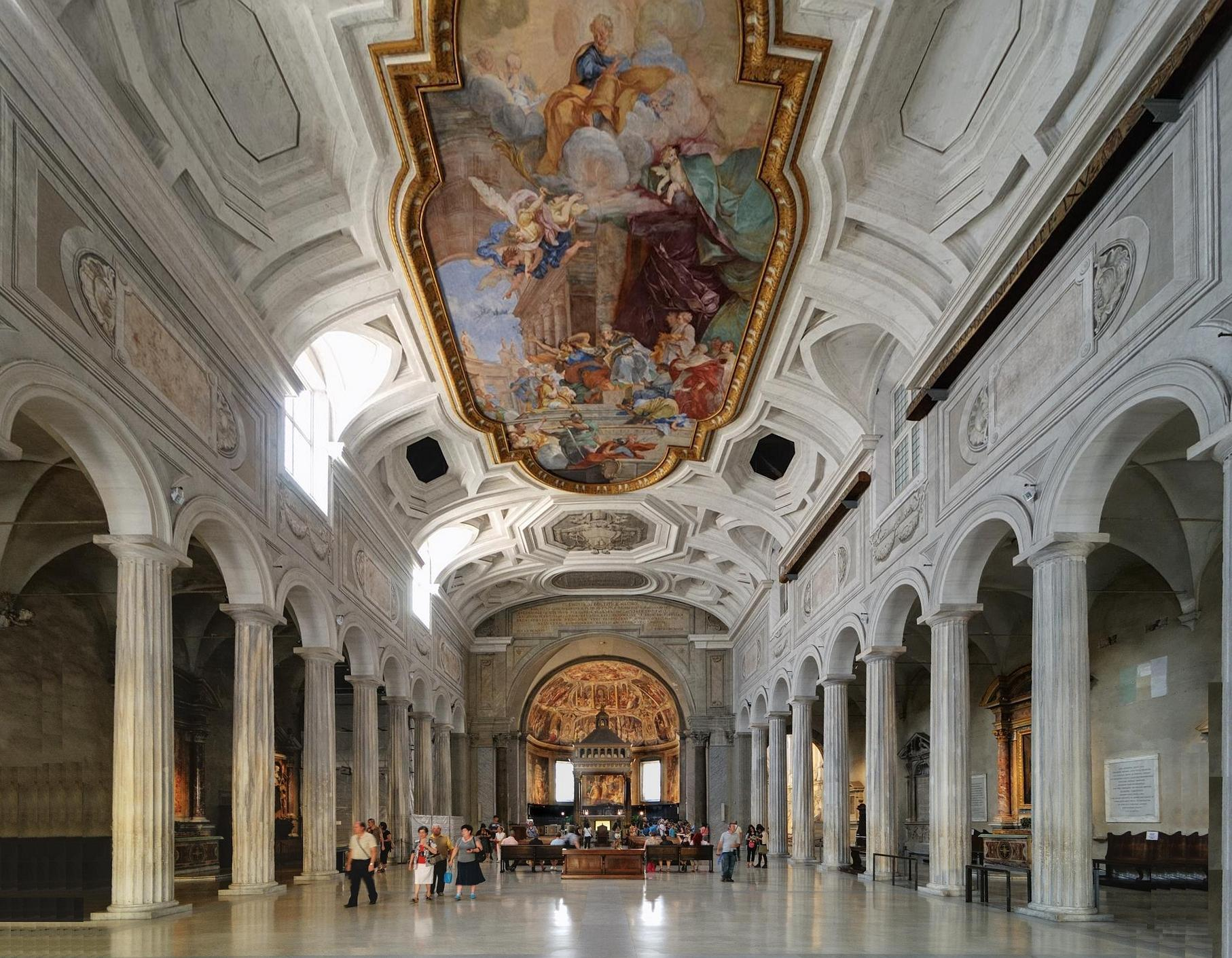
- The ceiling of the Roman basilica of San Pietro in Vincoli, designed by Fontana in 1705
- Born: 1668; Rome, Papal States
- Died: 3 July 1708 (aged 39–40); Castel Gandolfo, Papal States
- Known for: Architecture; Engineering
- Notable work: Palazzo Panciatichi, Florence; Santi Apostoli, Rome; Santa Maria del Suffragio, Ravenna
- Movement: Baroque
- Father: Carlo Fontana

Francesco Fontana (Rome, 1668 – Castel Gandolfo, 3 July 1708) was an Italian Baroque architect and engineer, son of Carlo Fontana. He designed the vault of San Pietro in Vincoli, the high altar of Sant'Andrea della Valle, and the Basilica of Santi Apostoli, Rome.

== Biography ==
Born in Rome in 1668, he trained under his father, and on 20 September 1693 he was nominated and elected Accademico di Merito at the Accademia di San Luca in Rome, obtaining membership on 10 January 1694. His earliest project was the Chapel of San Gesualdo in Velletri Cathedral, commissioned by Cardinal Alderano Cybo (1694–1698). In 1696, Cardinal Bandino Panciatichi, living in Rome, commissioned Fontana and Carlo Rainaldi to design a remodeling Palazzo Panciatichi, Florence. The work was forwarded by Antonio Maria Ferri and Paolo Falconieri, who completed the interior in 1697.

Francesco is best known for his church of Santi Apostoli, Rome, begun in 1701 and completed after his death by his father (whose pupil he had been) and Nicola Michetti. Erected on the restricted site of an Early Christian basilica, Santi Apostoli emulates Sant'Ignazio. Its distinction, however, resides in an impression of spaciousness and splendour achieved by a thoughtfully balanced scheme of proportion and the skilful use of coloured marble. Francesco's second major building was the Dogana di Terra (1695), Rome, which incorporates the 11 colossal columns of the Temple of Hadrian into the articulative scheme of the main front of the new structure. The building has been altered in modern times but is known through 18th-century views.

After this, it has been established that he was in charge (1697–1701) of completing Ottaviano Nonni’s church of San Salvatore in Lauro, where he worked on the transept in conformity with Nonni’s original plan. At the beginning of the 18th century Fontana provided the plan and a model for the abbey church in Fulda, and also attributed to him is the design of the centralized church of Santa Maria del Suffragio, Ravenna, begun in 1701 and comprising an octagonal main space opening on all sides into chapels. The excessively heavy coffered ceiling of San Pietro in Vincoli (1705) is one of Fontana’s less successful works, but the delicately curved front of Santa Maria ad Nives (1705–6) demonstrates a full understanding of the tradition established by Borromini and his followers, as well as Fontana’s ability to solve problems of urban context.

Following the catastrophic earthquake of 2 February 1703, Ludovico Alfieri commissioned Fontana to design and oversee the reconstruction of the interior of Palazzo Pica Alfieri. Construction of the palace was completed in 1726 by Pietropaolo Porani, who designed the Baroque main façade featuring its characteristic tripartite structure and balcony supported by four slender columns.

Like his father, Francesco was an expert in water engineering; in 1695 he was appointed Architetto dell’Acqua Felice under Pope Innocent XII. When Carlo became Chief Architect of St. Peter's Basilica in 1697, Francesco took over his father's former position as Revisore delle Misure. He also later followed in the footsteps of his other famous ancestor, Domenico Fontana (who had moved four obelisks in Rome while in the service of Pope Sixtus V, 1585–90), when in 1704 he directed the raising of the Column of Marcus Aurelius, an enterprise that succeeded only on the second attempt in the following year. The column was destined to adorn the square in front of the Palazzo Montecitorio, which Carlo Fontana had expanded for the use of a Roman Curia. Perhaps Francesco's chief merit, however, was in the able administration of the Accademia di San Luca and the influence he had on such students as Filippo Juvarra. Adhering to the tenets of Late Baroque classicism, Francesco's major works approach the taste and grandeur of those of his father, even if they show less imagination. It would be wrong to call his work conservative or retardataire, however, for a significant element of 18th-century Roman architecture, the ‘progressive’ approach introduced by Borromini, was also strongly evident in his development, unfortunately cut short by his early death. Fontana was Regens (head) of the Congregazione dei Virtuosi al Pantheon and was made a Knight of the Supreme Order of Christ.

== Writings ==
- Relazione dello stato vecchio, e nuovo dell’Acqua Felice con la notizia del suo accrescimento nel presente anno 1696; essendo presidente della medesima l'Illustrissimo e Reverendissimo Monsignor Lorenzo Corsini. Rome: G.F. Buagni. 1696.

== Gallery ==
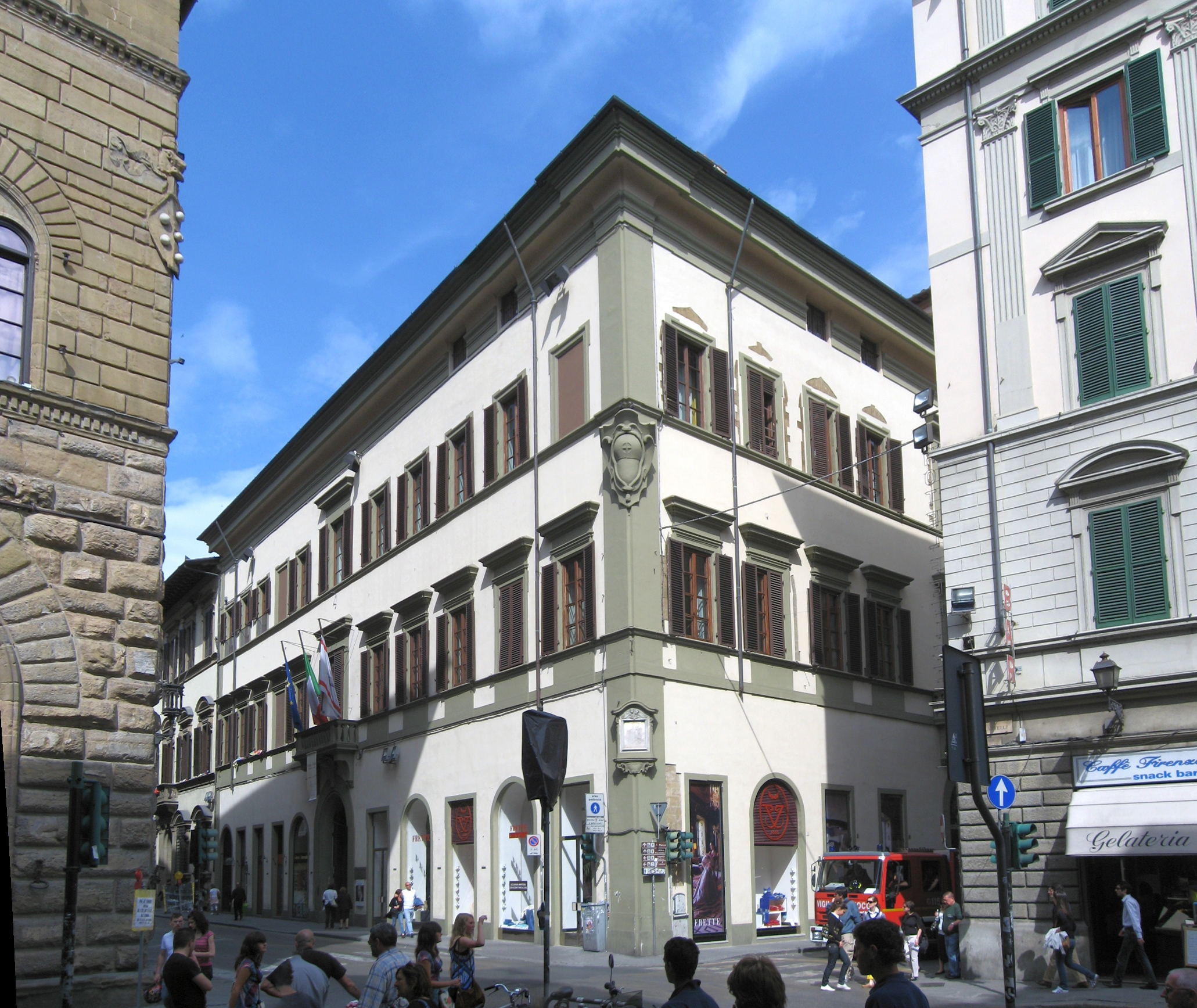
Palazzo Panciatichi, Florence (1696–99)

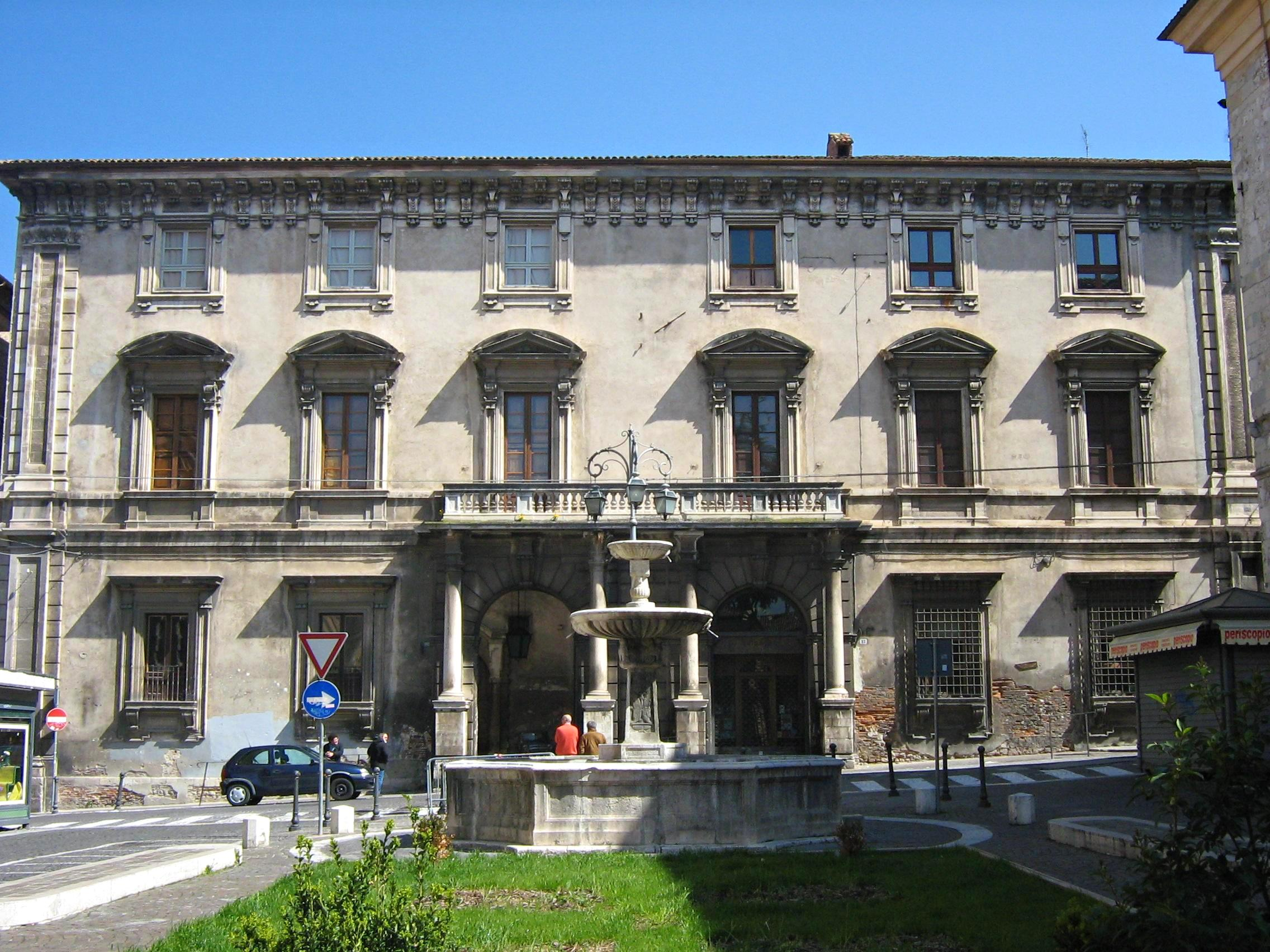
Palazzo Pica Alfieri, L’Aquila (1703)

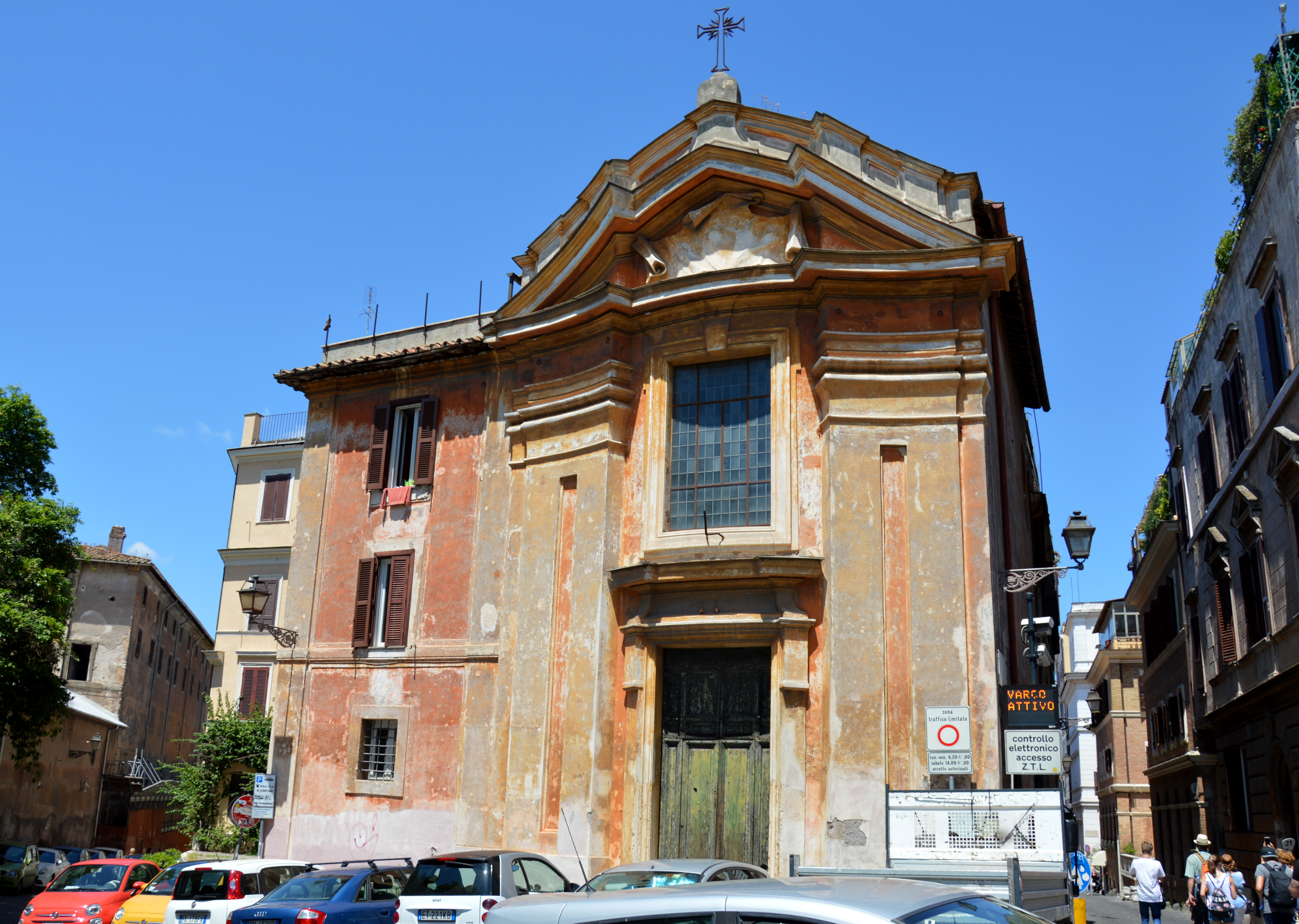
Santa Maria ad Nives, Rome (1705–6)

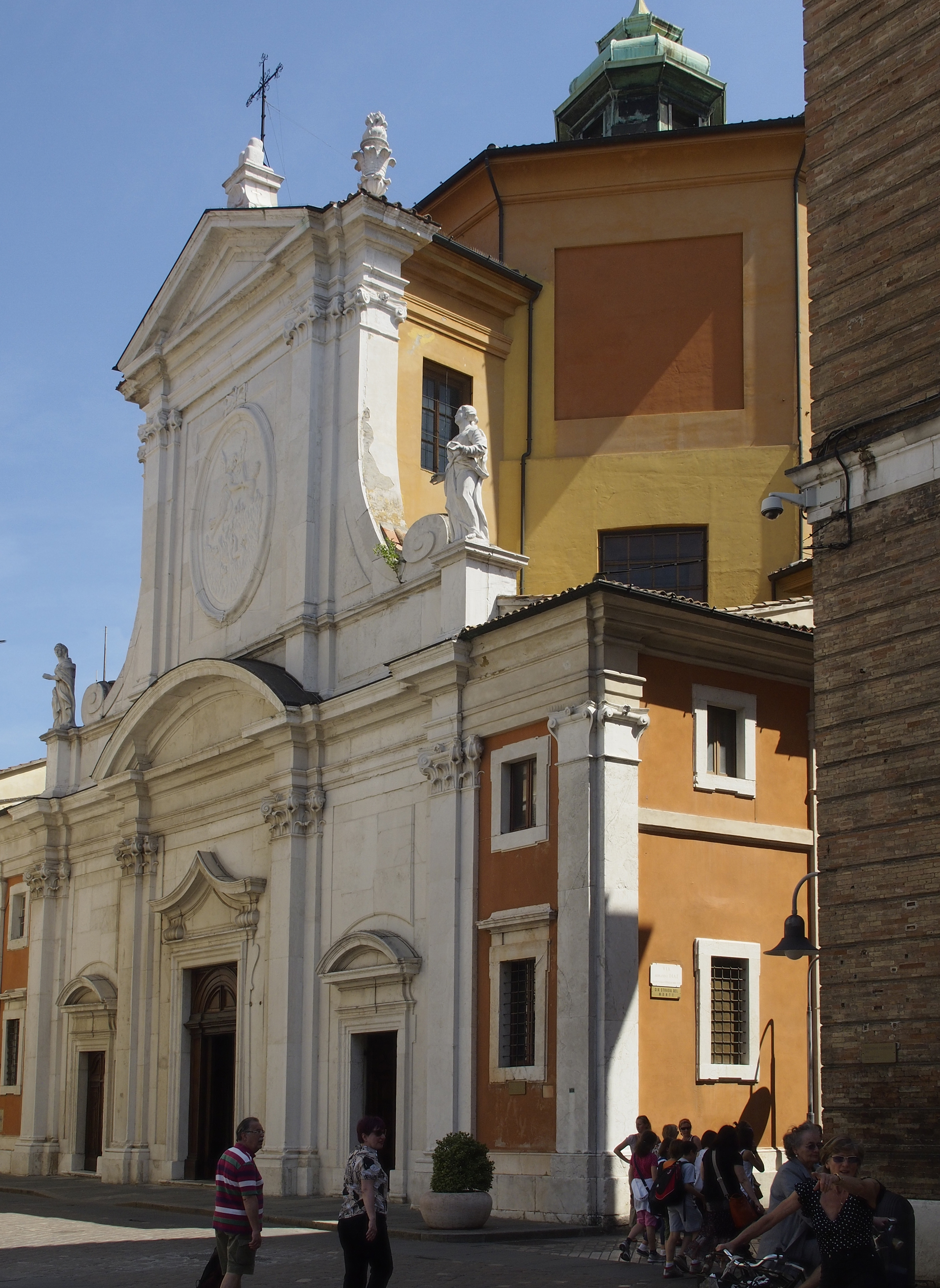
Santa Maria del Suffragio, Ravenna (1701–1728)

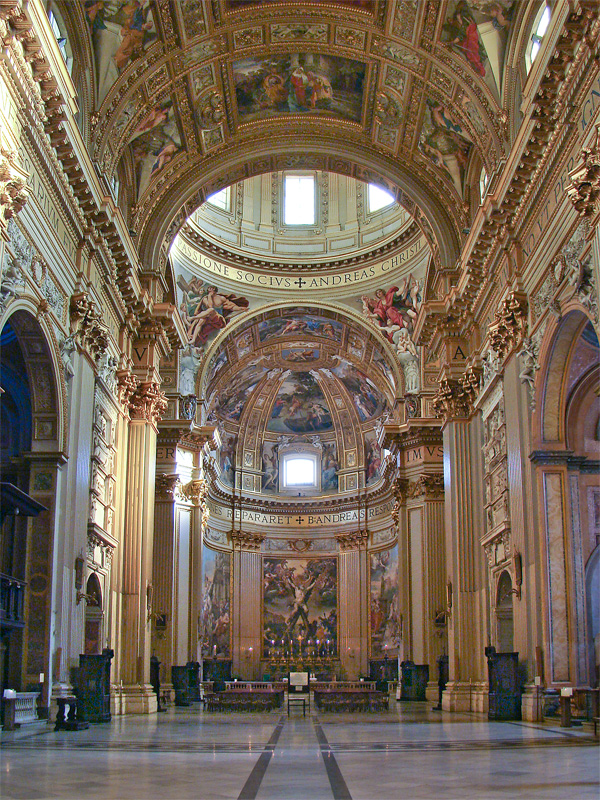
High altar of Sant'Andrea della Valle

== Bibliography ==
- Bianchi, Giuseppe (1900). Gli Artisti Ticinesi. Dizionario biografico. Lugano: Libreria Bianchi.
- Finocchi Ghersi, Lorenzo (1991). "Francesco Fontana e la basilica dei Santi Apostoli a Roma". Storia dell’Arte. 73: 332–360.
- Trezzini, Celestino (1926). "Francesco Fontana" (PDF). Historisch-Biographisches Lexikon der Schweiz. Vol. 3: Fe – Freibergen. Neuenburg: Paul Attinger. p. 194.
