= Ippolito Buzzi =

Italian artist

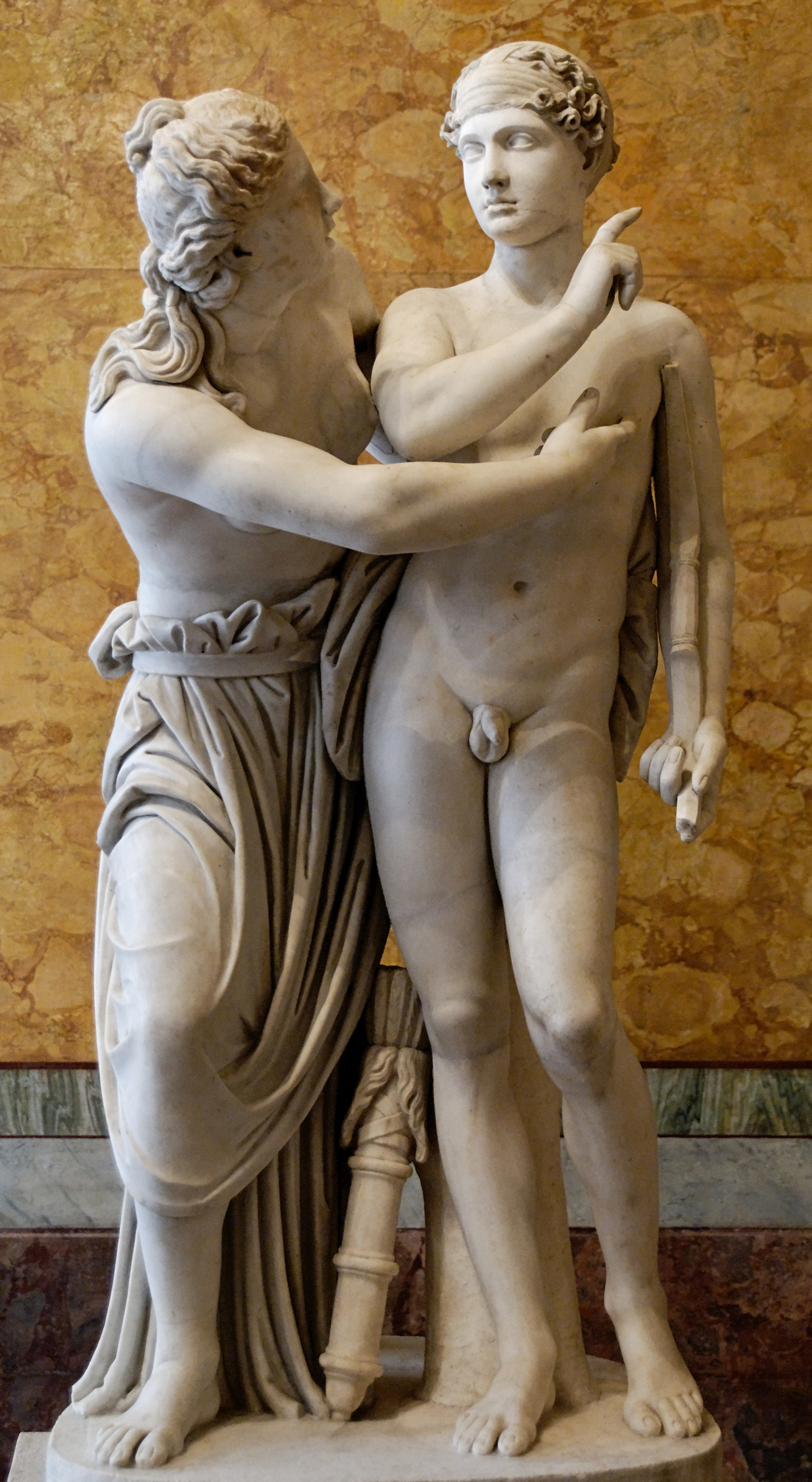
Amore and Psyche, a composition by Buzzi combining two antique male torsos and his own additions, Palazzo Altemps

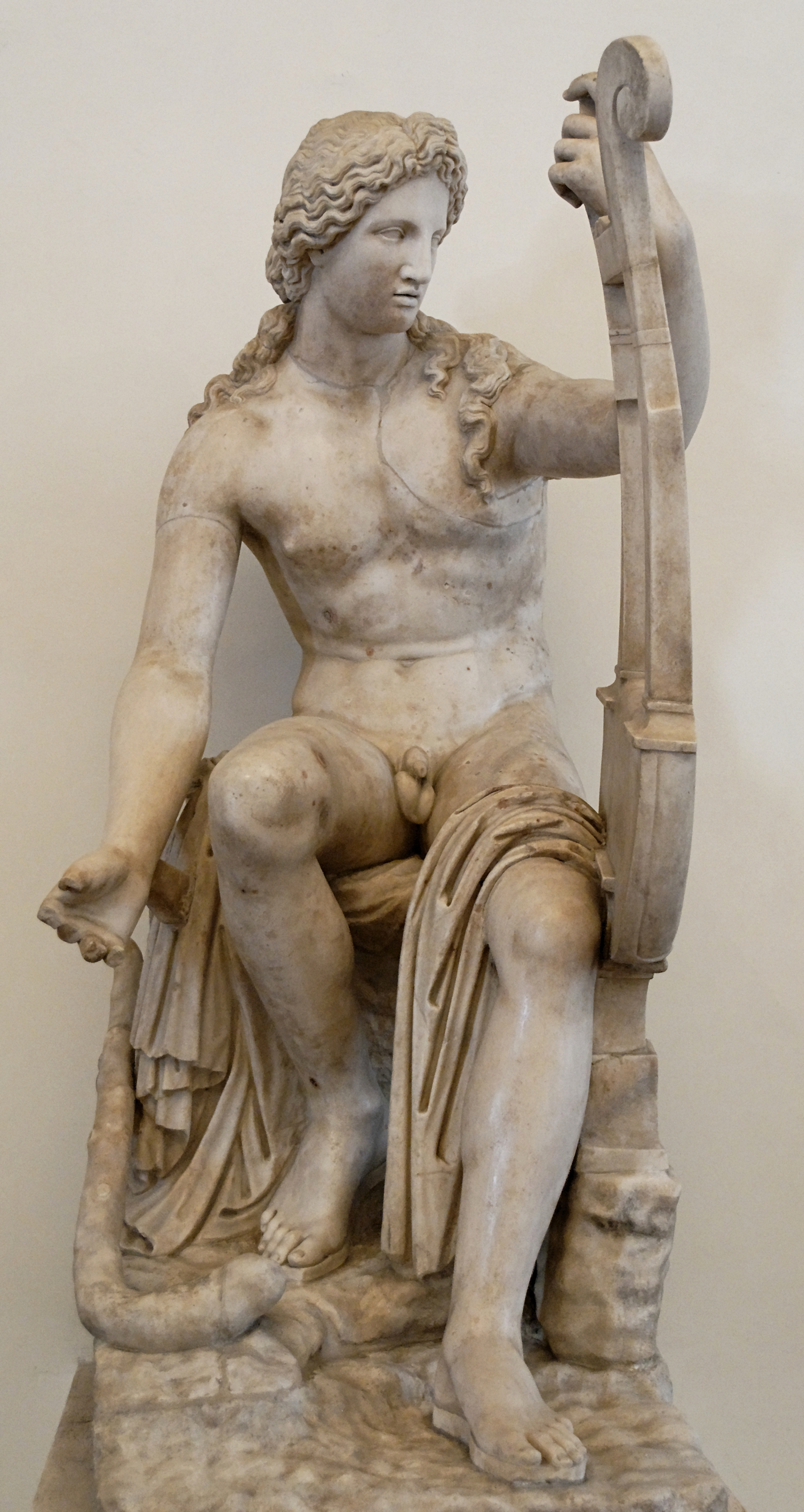
Statue of Apollo restored by Buzzi for Cardinal Ludovisi (only the torso and right leg are antique), Palazzo Altemps

Ippolito Buzzi (or Buzio) (1562–1634) was an Italian sculptor from Viggiù, near Varese, in northernmost Lombardy, a member of a long-established dynasty of painters, sculptors and architects from the town, who passed his mature career in Rome. His personality as a sculptor is somewhat overshadowed by the two kinds of work he is known for: restorations to ancient Roman sculptures, some of them highly improvisatory by modern standards, and sculpture contributed to architectural projects and funeral monuments, where he was one among a team of craftsmen working under the general direction of an architect, like Giacomo della Porta - in projects for Pope Clement VIII, or Flaminio Ponzio - in projects for Pope Paul V - who would provide the designs from which the work was executed, always in consultation with the patron.

Buzzi also turned his hand to garden sculpture of a high order, such as caryatids for the Teatro delle Acque in the Villa Aldobrandini, Frascati, works that were in the process of completion from 1603, with water features designed by Orazio Olivieri and Giovanni Guglielmi. Eva-Bettina Krems suggests that Pietro Aldobrandini's secretary, Monsignor Giovanni Battista Agucchi, is a likely candidate for the connection that introduced Buzzi to Cardinal Ludovico Ludovisi.

== Classical restorations ==
From about 1620 Buzzi was virtually the house restorer for Cardinal Ludovisi, who possessed in his villa on the Quirinale one of the finest collections of Roman sculptures in Rome, and commissioned repairs from Gian Lorenzo Bernini—whose minor restorations to the Ludovisi Ares are discreet—and Alessandro Algardi, who supported himself with restoration work, as well as Buzzi. Some of Buzzi's restorations are minor interventions to satisfy the taste of the day, as with the Ludovisi Dying Gaul; while others are more creative and incur the uneasy dissatisfaction of 21st-century writers on antiquities, especially when unrelated fragments were assembled, to create essentially new compositions, such as Buzzi's Amore and Psyche in the Ludovisi collection. A Hermaphroditus belonging to Ludovisi was restored by Buzzi, 1621–23; it was later purchased by Ferdinando II de' Medici and is in the Uffizi. Buzzi restored the marble group in the Prado now identified equally as Castor and Pollux or as Orestes and Pylades providing the headless torso with an ancient bust of Antinous, the emperor Hadrian's favorite.

Examples of a kind of hybrid sculpture that typifies some aspects of Roman taste of the time are two portrait heads that are fitted to antique Roman busts; they stand side by side in the Palazzo dei Conservatori, Sala dei Capitani: one is a head of Alessandro Farnese by Buzzi, 1593, the other a head of Carlo Barberini by Gian Lorenzo Bernini, 1630.

== Architectural sculpture ==
In the other main aspect of his career, Buzzi was a member of the team of sculptors who cooperated under the direction of Giacomo Della Porta in the redecoration of the transept in the Basilica of San Giovanni in Laterano, 1597–1601, under the direction of Clement VIII Aldobrandini, providing high reliefs in what has been called one of the most harmonious manifestations of Late Mannerism in Rome.

Della Porta was also responsible for the architectural framework and the overall design of the richly sculptural monument that Clement VIII Aldobrandini erected to commemorate his parents Salvestro Aldobrandini and Luisa Dati, in the Basilica of Santa Maria sopra Minerva; Buzzi, again part of Della Porta's team, executed the allegorical figure of Prudence and the sculpture in a niche of Clement VIII himself, probably his most prominent commission, though he was doubtless provided with a design.

In a similar commission, this time under the direction of Flaminio Ponzio, Buzzi was one of the team of sculptors working in the Basilica di Santa Maria Maggiore on the funerary Pauline Chapel commissioned by Paul V Borghese, 1611. Ponzio was somewhat constrained in his architectural framing by the necessity of making the architecture correspond to the chapel facing it across the nave, of Sixtus V Peretti, by Domenico Fontana, completed in the previous generation. Her,e Buzzi contributed one of five relief panels illustrating Scenes of the Pontificate of Paul V and one of those beneath the papal tomb, where Pietro Bernini was responsible for another panel and the caryatid figures, while Buzzi's countryman Silla executed the sculpture of Paul V blessing.

Another project of Paul V was the Acqua Paola (1612), erected in emulation of the stylistically more successful Acqua Felice. The architect for the fountain where the aqueduct arrived in Rome was Flaminio Ponzio, and Buzzi was part of the team, though his contribution may have been limited to the sculptural Borghese coat-of-arms supported by two putti, that crowns the cornice of the triumphal arch feature, through which nothing may pass.

== Other works ==
Buzzi's other sculptures include a Saint James in the church of San Giacomo in Augusta in Rome, completed in about 1615, and one of the Angels in the angle niches in the Church of the Gesù in Rome (in the third chapel on the right). His Saint Bartholomew may be seen in the Duomo in Orvieto.
