= Church of the Holy Family, Ince Blundell =

Coordinates: 53.5195°N 3.0169°W

- Location in Merseyside
- OS grid reference: SD 327 030
- Location: Ince Blundell, Sefton, Merseyside
- Country: England
- Denomination: Roman Catholic
- Website: Holy Family, Ince Blundell

History
- Status: Estate church and parish church
- Founder: Thomas Weld

Architecture
- Functional status: Active
- Heritage designation: Grade II*
- Designated: 11 October 1968
- Architect: J. J. Scoles
- Architectural type: Church
- Style: Quattrocento Italianate
- Groundbreaking: 1858
- Completed: 1860

Specifications
- Materials: Brick with stone dressings, slate roof

Clergy
- Priest: Fr David Gamble

The Church of the Holy Family is attached to the service wing of Ince Blundell Hall, near the village of Ince Blundell, Sefton, Merseyside, England. It is both an estate church and an active Roman Catholic parish church in the Archdiocese of Liverpool. The church was built in 1858–60, it was designed by J. J. Scoles, and it contains paintings by Gebhard Flatz. It is recorded in the National Heritage List for England as a designated Grade II* listed building.

== History ==
Ince Blundell Hall was the home of the Blundell family until 1837 when it passed to the Weld family. Thomas Weld expanded the hall and added a chapel, which is known as the Church of the Holy Family. This was built in 1858–60 and was designed by J. J. Scoles. In the 1960s the church was given to the Archdiocese of Liverpool. It has functioned from the start both as a private chapel and as a place of public worship.

== Architecture ==
The church is built in brick with stone dressings and has a slate roof. The west face is in two storeys on a stone base. It is in three bays, with the central bay being round-headed and projecting forward. There is a band between the storeys, and at the top is a pediment with foliage in the tympanum. It is surmounted by a cross. In the lower storey are two round-headed windows in the central bay, and one in each of the outer bays. The upper storey contains a central pair of tall round-headed windows under and arch, and in the outer bays are round-headed niches under cornices. To the left of the west front is an enclosed porch with a turret. The rest of the exterior is plain, with clerestory windows along the sides, and an apse at the east end.

The interior of the church is in Quattrocento Italianate style with much painted decoration. The nave is in five bays, it has a coffered ceiling, and at the west end is a gallery carried on Doric columns with a balustrade. The painting is in Renaissance arabesque style. The style is similar to that of the interior of the hall, which was executed by J. G. Crace, and Pollard and Pevsner suggest that Crace was also responsible for the interior of the church. The altarpiece was painted by Gebhard Flatz, and there are grisaille paintings in framed panels in the nave, also by Flatz. In the large west window is stained glass by Forrest of Liverpool dating from about 1860–67, and under the gallery are four windows by Hardman from the inter-war years. Also in the church is a memorial brass to Charles Blundell dating from about 1860, containing two angels, an inscription, and a cross.

== Appraisal ==
The church was designated as a Grade II* listed building on 20 December 1996. Grade II* is the middle of the three grades of listing and is applied to buildings that are "particularly important buildings of more than special interest".

== See also ==
- Listed buildings in Ince Blundell
