= Ravenmeols (ward) =

Electoral ward in Sefton, England

Coordinates: 53.5458°N 3.0566°W

Ravenmeols is a Metropolitan Borough of Sefton ward in the Sefton Central Parliamentary constituency that covers the village of Ince Blundell and the nearby hamlets of Lady Green and Carr Houses, the village of Little Altcar, and the eastern half of the town of Formby including the eastern half of the area known as Freshfield. The population of this ward taken at the 2011 census was 12,065.

== Councillors ==
Term	Councillor	Party
1998–Present	Barry Griffiths	Conservative Party
2010–Present	David McIvor	Conservative Party
2011–Present	Catie Page	Labour Party

== Election results ==
=== Elections of the 2010s ===
Sefton Metropolitan Borough Council Municipal Elections 2018 Ravenmeols
Party	Candidate	Votes	%	±%
Labour	Nina Killen	1551	41%	
FRAG	Maria Bennett	1288	34%	
Conservative	Gemma Peace	781	21%	
Liberal Democrats	Mark Senior	159	4%	
Majority				
Turnout		3779	39%	
Labour gain from FRAG		Swing		

Sefton Metropolitan Borough Council Municipal Elections 2011 Ravenmeols
Party	Candidate	Votes	%	±%
Labour	Catie Page	2032	45%	
Conservative	Debi Jones	1974	43%	
Liberal Democrats	Linda Anne Hough	307	7%	
Green	Richard Graham Willis	241	5%	
Majority				
Turnout		4554	49%	
Labour gain from Conservative		Swing		

Sefton Metropolitan Borough Council Municipal Elections 2010: Ravenmeols
Party	Candidate	Votes	%	±%
Conservative	David McIvor	2561	37%	
Labour	Paul Dennis Flodman	2385	35%	
Liberal Democrats	Linda Anne Hough	1525	22%	
UKIP	Andrew Noel Dobson	406	6%	
Majority				
Turnout		6877	73%	
Conservative hold		Swing		
