= Listed buildings in Ince Blundell =

Ince Blundell is a civil parish and a village in Sefton, Merseyside, England. It contains 24 buildings that are recorded in the National Heritage List for England as designated listed buildings. Of these, five are listed at Grade II*, the middle of the three grades, and the others are at Grade II, the lowest grade.

The major building in the parish is Ince Blundell Hall, which is listed, together with associated buildings, including its chapel, its gateways, and other structures within its grounds. Listed buildings outside the grounds include houses, farmhouses and farm buildings, and a medieval cross in the village.

== Key ==
Grade	Criteria
II*	Particularly important buildings of more than special interest
II	Buildings of national importance and special interest

== Buildings ==
Name and location	Photograph	Date	Notes	Grade
Village cross 53.52392°N 3.02641°W		Medieval	The cross is in stone. The base is medieval, and consists of eight square steps. The cross dates from 1876, it is chamfered with scrolls at the ends of the arms. The centre is round and is inscribed with the initials "IHS". The cross is also a scheduled monument.	II
Wayside cross 53.51991°N 3.01453°W	—	Medieval	The wayside cross is in the grounds of Ince Blundell Hall. Its square stone base is medieval, and has incised crosses on the sides and two rectangular depressions on the top. It is surmounted by a modern wooden cross. The cross is also a scheduled monument.	II
Cross Barn; 53.51959°N 3.02017°W	—	c. 1540	The barn was used as a Roman Catholic chapel in the 17th and 18th centuries, and was later converted into a house. It is basically timber-framed, it is clad in brick with stone dressings, and has a slate roof. The building is in one storey with an attic, and has a cruciform plan. Inside are two cruck trusses.	II
Barn, Grange Farm; 53.53627°N 3.06725°W	—	c. 1550	The barn was used as a Roman Catholic chapel in the 17th century. It is in brick on a stone base, with a stone-slate roof, in six bays, with a four-bay cow house to the south. It contains entrances, a pitch hole and ventilations slits. Inside are niches containing holy water stoups.	II
Ince Blundell Old Hall; 53.51841°N 3.01781°W	—	c. 1590–1620	Despite its name, this is not the predecessor to the present hall; in the 19th century it was used as a malt house. The building is in brick with stone dressings, it has a roof of slate and stone-slate, and is in three storeys and five irregular bays. The windows are mullioned, and the entrances have stone quoins and large lintels.	II*
Car Side Farmhouse; 53.52232°N 3.00643°W	—	17th century (probable)	Most of the farmhouse dates from the 18th century. It is built in brick with a hipped slate roof, and has two storeys and a four-bay front. At the centre is a gabled porch with a round-arched entrance. The windows are sashes; those on the sides and at the rear are horizontally-sliding.	II
Moss Farmhouse; 53.53567°N 3.05397°W	—	Late 17th century	The farmhouse is in brick with a corrugated iron roof, and is basically timber-framed. Additions were made to it later, and the windows are 20th-century casements. Inside is a full cruck and parts of two further crucks.	II
Ince Blundell Hall; 53.51901°N 3.01631°W		1720–50	A country house in Georgian style, it was extended in the 19th century, and later used as a nursing home. The house is in brick with stone dressings, and has an L-shaped plan. The main range is in three storeys, with a front of nine bays, and a five-bay single-storey 19th-century wing to the right. At the rear is a two-storey ten-bay service wing joined to the main range by a single-storey block. The middle three bays of the main range project forward, they are flanked by pairs of Corinthian pilasters, with two Corinthian columns in the centre. The windows are sashes with architraves.	II*
Rigmaiden's Farmhouse; 53.52606°N 3.01844°W	—	Early to mid 18th century	The farmhouse is in rendered brick with a slate roof. It is in two storeys and has a two-bay front. In the centre is a gabled porch with a round-headed opening. The windows on the front are 20th-century casements, and on the sides and rear they are horizontally-sliding sashes.	II
Sundial, Ince Blundell Hall; 53.51886°N 3.01664°W	—	1743	The sundial is to the southwest of the main range of the hall, and consists of a stone baluster dated 1743. Its metal plate is missing.	II
Sunnyfield Farmhouse; 53.51234°N 3.01366°W	—	Before 1769	The farmhouse is in brick with stone dressings and has a slate roof. It is in two storeys, and has a three-bay front, with a single-bay extension to the right. The doorway is round-headed with a fanlight, and the windows are sashes with wedge lintels.	II
East Gate, Ince Blundell Hall; 53.51724°N 3.00336°W	—	1770–76	The gateway is in stone and consists of a central archway and flanking pedestrian entrances. The central arch has imposts, a fluted frieze, and an archivolt. It is flanked by pairs of Ionic pilasters, with festoon-decorated capitals carrying a pediment. Above the pedestrian entrances are tented caps.	II
Lion Gate, Ince Blundell Hall; 53.51151°N 3.01202°W		1770–76	A gateway by Henry Blundell consisting of a central archway and flanking pedestrian entrances. The archway has Doric columns, and a Doric entablature with an open pediment. This contains a cartouche with the family arms and a wreathed urn. The pedestrian entrances are rusticated, and above one is a lion and above the other a lioness.	II
Northeast Gate, Ince Blundell Hall; 53.51966°N 3.00858°W	—	1770–76	The gateway is flanked by gate piers. These are in stone and are rusticated, with moulded caps, and flattened ball finials. The piers are set in brick walls with stone coping.	II
Structure, Ince Blundell Hall; 53.51921°N 3.01753°W	—	Late 18th century	The structure was originally to house Henry Blundell's collection of Classical statues. It is in stuccoed brick with a slate roof. It has an octagonal plan, and is built into a garden wall. There is a round-headed entrance with an acanthus keystone. Inside are round-headed recesses.	II
Priest's House; 53.51599°N 3.01869°W	—	Late 18th century	A brick house with stone dressings and a slate roof. It has a circular plan with a conical roof and a central circular chimney stack. It is in two storeys, and eight bays, these being alternately curved and flat. The doorway is round-headed, and the windows are sashes.	II
Garden temple, Ince Blundell Hall; 53.51894°N 3.01717°W	—	c. 1790–92	This was designed by William Everard to house Henry Blundell's collection of Classical statues, and is in the form of a temple. It is in brick with stone dressings, and on the front are an entablature with a fluted frieze and rosettes, a mask in the pediment, and a Tuscan portico with four columns. Inside are recesses for sculptures and blind Venetian windows.	II*
Stables, Ince Blundell Hall; 53.51801°N 3.01764°W	—	c. 1800–14	The stables are in brick with stone dressings, and have a hipped slate roof. They are in two storeys with a nine-bay front. There is a pediment above the middle three bays. In the centre is a large round-headed recess containing an entrance with pilasters, an archivolt and a fanlight, and with a Diocletian window above. The ground floor windows are sashes with wedge lintels.	II
Pantheon, Ince Blundell Hall; 53.51925°N 3.01602°W	—	1802–10	A gallery built to house Henry Blundell's collection of Classical statues, its design based on the Pantheon in Rome. It is in stone with a lead dome, and has a circular plan with a four-column Ionic portico, and an octagonal vestibule. The interior is lined with marble, there are niches, an Ionic pilastrade, and the dome is coffered with a glazed oculus.	II*
Lion Cottage; 53.51128°N 3.01162°W	—	1820s–1830s	A house near Lion Gate, stuccoed with a pyramidal stone-slate roof. It is in two storeys and three bays. The central entrance has a porch with a pediment, and the windows are horizontally-sliding sashes.	II
White House; 53.51001°N 3.01064°W	—	1820s–1830s	A stuccoed house with a hipped slate roof. It is in two storeys, and has a three-bay front. There is a central entrance with an architrave and a fanlight. The windows are sashes. At the rear is a stable block that is included in the listing.	II
Monument, Ince Blundell Hall; 53.51888°N 3.01594°W	—	Early 19th century	The monument is to the south of the main range of the hall. It consists of a marble Tuscan column on a stone plinth carrying an eagle.	II
West Lodge, Ince Blundell Hall; 53.51644°N 3.01919°W		Mid 19th century	The lodge is in brick with stone dressings and has a slate roof. It is in three bays, the central bay with two storeys, and the outer bays in a single storey with an attic. The central bay projects forward with flanking pilasters. In its centre is a round-arched gateway with an archivolt and with a decorated keystone and spandrels. The windows are round-headed with sashes.	II
Chapel of the Holy Family; 53.51951°N 3.01681°W	—	1858–60	Attached to the service wing of the hall, the chapel also acts as a Roman Catholic parish church. It is by J. J. Scoles, and is in brick on a stone base, with stone dressings and a slate roof. The west face is in two storeys with a pediment and an apex cross. It contains round-headed windows, a roundel in the tympanum, niches, and an enclosed porch. Inside is a west gallery on Doric columns, a coffered ceiling, and a scheme of wall paintings.	II*
