= Motorcycles in the United Kingdom fire services =

Motorcycles used by fire services in the United Kingdom

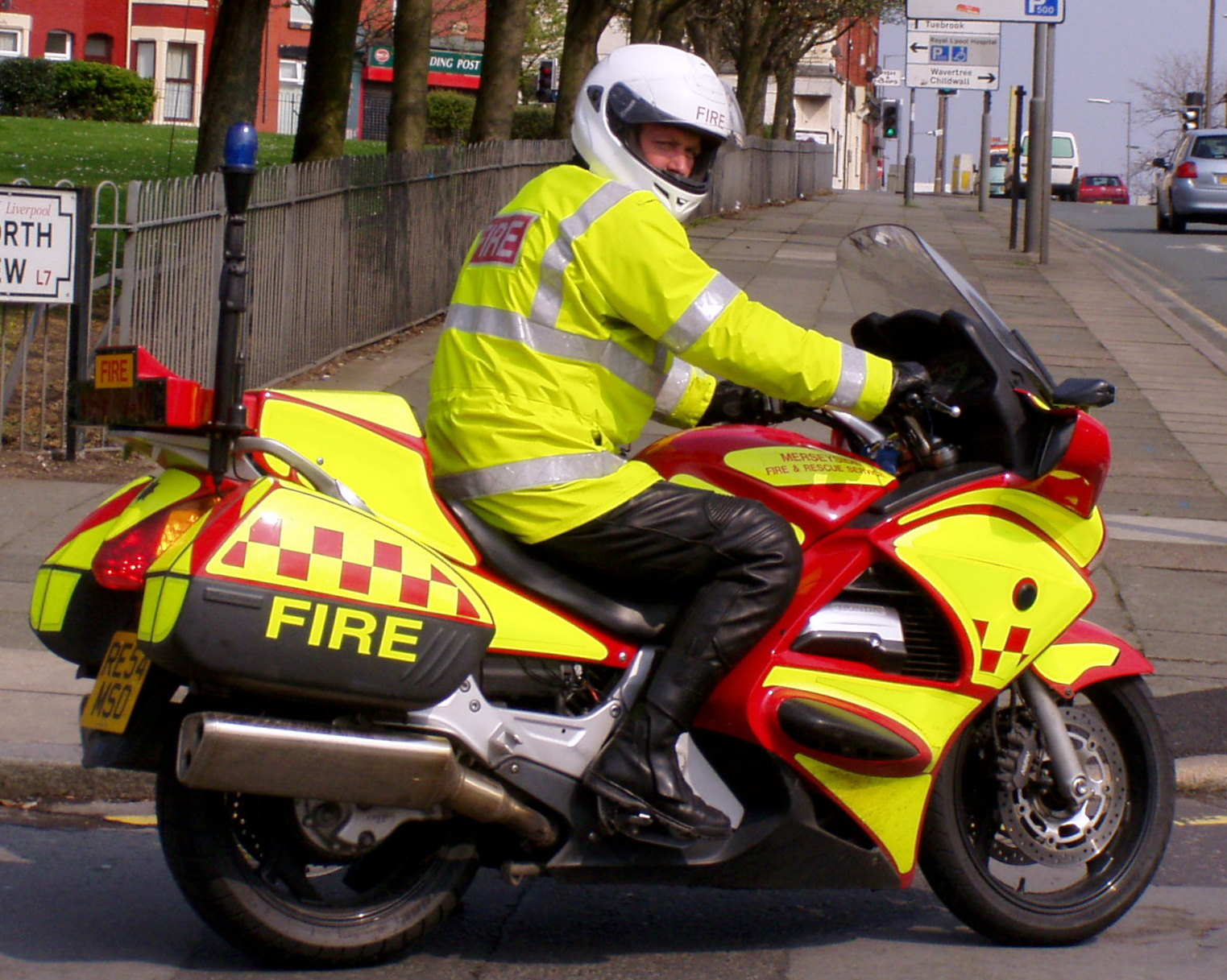
The Merseyside Fire and Rescue Service Honda ST1300 fire alarm response motorcycle.

The fire services in the United Kingdom use motorcycles (fire bikes) in various roles. A number of fire and rescue services around the UK use fire motorcycles to deliver road safety messages. From 2005, Merseyside fire service deployed a motorcycle in an automatic alarm response role, and from 2007 they have used two quad-bikes for public information campaigns. In 2010, Merseyside became the first fire service in the UK to use fire motorcycles as an actual fire appliance, to be used to fight small fires. Having been deployed in a six-month trial, if found successful they could be deployed to other services nationally.

== Merseyside ==
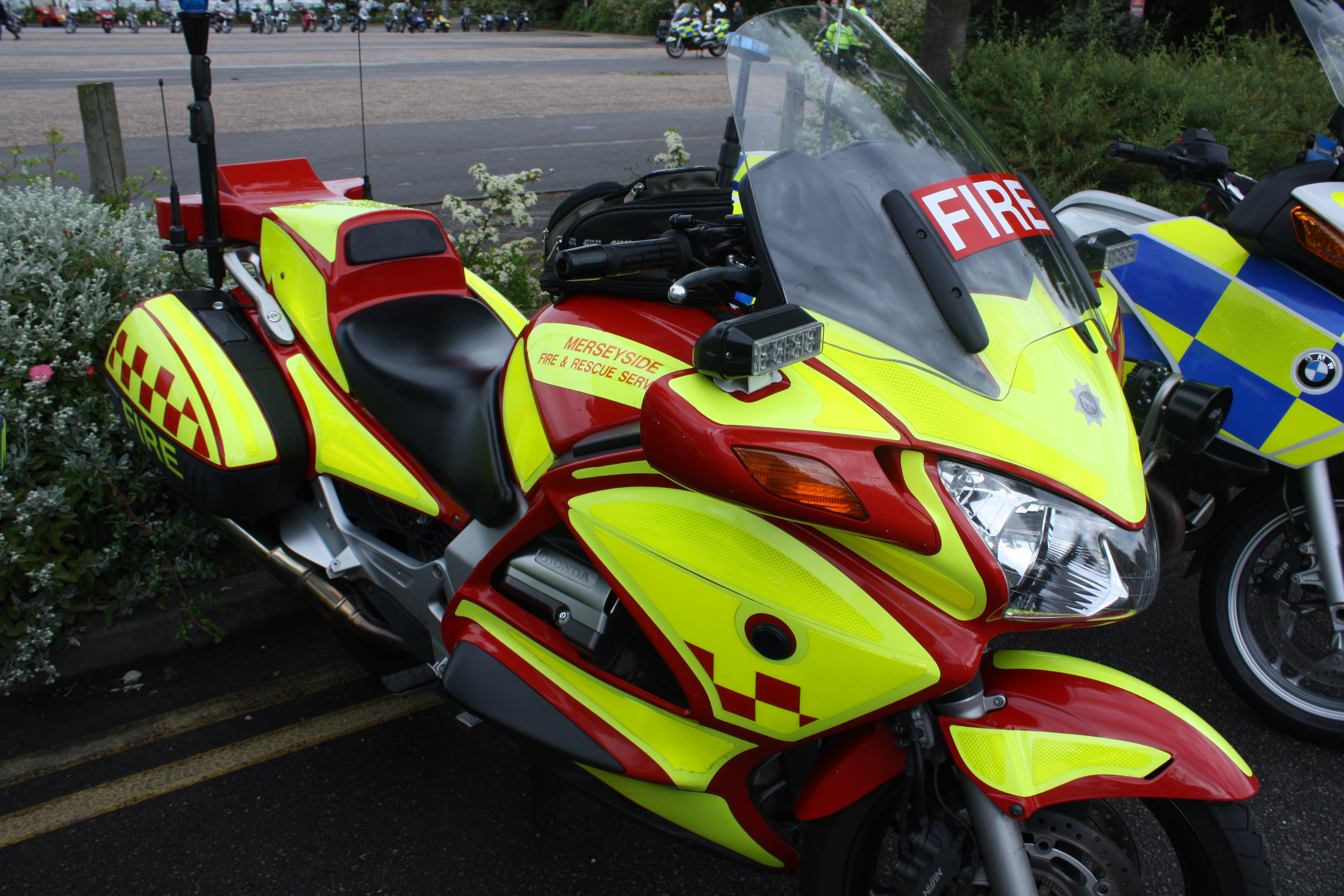
The Merseyside Fire and Rescue Service fire bike

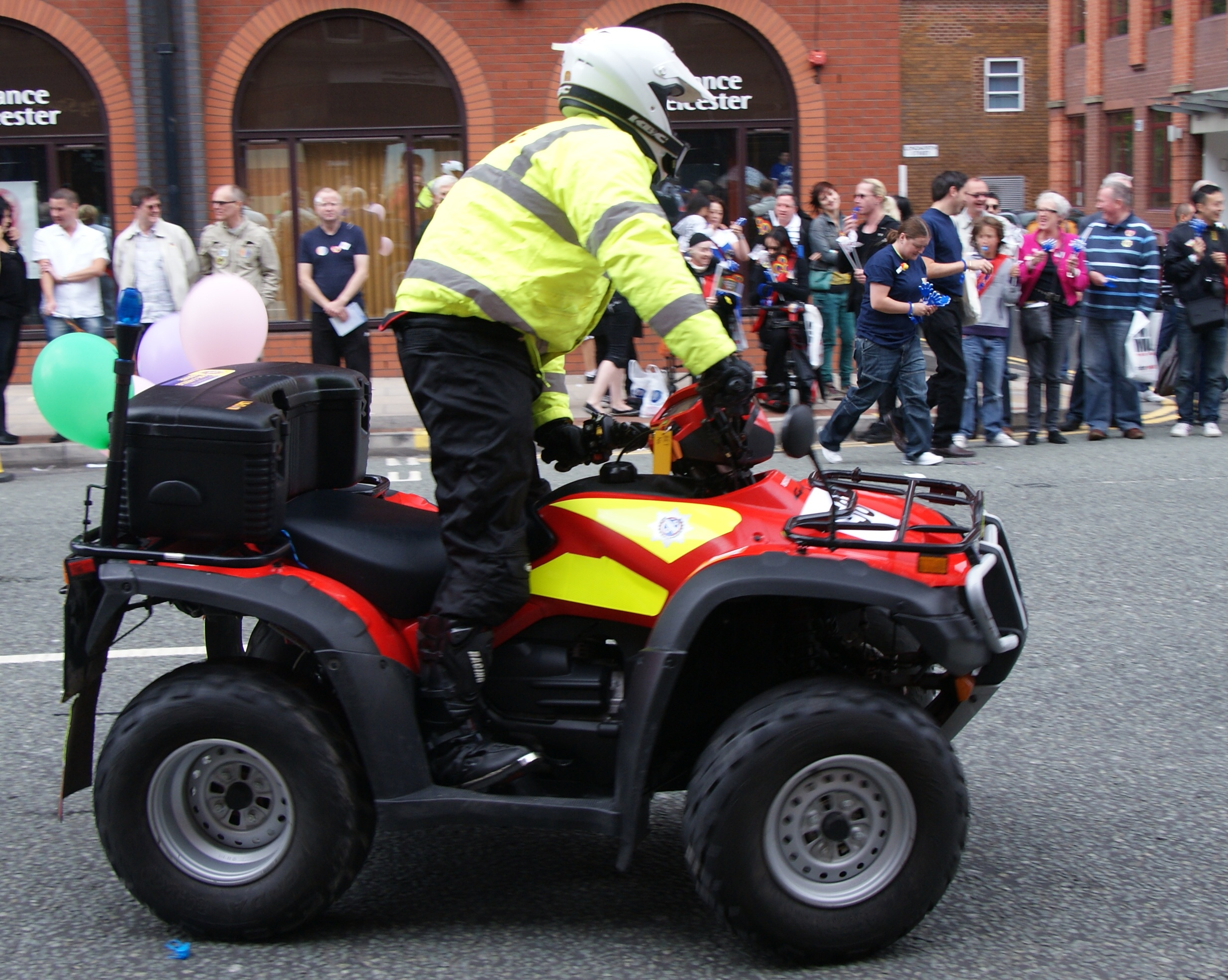
The Merseyside fire quad-bike

=== Alarm response bike ===
The Merseyside Fire and Rescue Service have been using motorcycles since 2005. A 1300cc Honda Pan-European motorcycle is used in busy times during the day to quickly attend automated fire alarm incidents in Liverpool, ahead of main appliances, to assess situations at the premises. The motorcycle is equipped with blue lights, emergency warning equipment, a first aid kit and an extinguisher, as well as an LED matrix sign. The motorcycle was introduced due to rising congestion, and because "virtually all" of calls, comprising 800 in city centre commercial areas, 6,000 overall, were false alarms.

=== Quad-bikes ===
In 2007, the Merseyside service also introduced two Honda quad-bikes to assist in reducing and preventing anti-social behaviour fires in areas that are used for public recreation, by promoting public awareness and engaging with young people. The service was also to investigate if they could be used operationally to fight woodland or grass fires.

=== Hose-equipped bikes ===
On 23 July 2010, it was announced the first hose-equipped fire motorcycles were to be used in the United Kingdom. The Merseyside service announced it was to start a six-month trial of two specially equipped motorcycles, which are fitted with two 25-litre (5.5-imperial-gallon; 6.6-US-gallon) canisters filled with water and foam, and a high powered 30-metre (100-foot) long jet hose. Other fire services have attended a demonstration of the motorcycles in Merseyside.

The motorcycles will be sent to fires instead of fire appliances when fires are not deemed a threat to people or buildings, thereby freeing up main appliances for use elsewhere. The equipment on one motorcycle can fight a fire for two to three minutes, but can extinguish a car fire in around 20 seconds. The motorcycles will be sent to incidents of anti-social rubbish fires in skips or wheelie bins, which account for 60% of the force's fire call outs.

The riders use a bespoke designed suit which is both fire-protective and suitable for motorcycle riding, although the rider still has to switch between two helmets; a motorcycle helmet and a firefighter's helmet. The motorcycles cost about £30,000 to buy and equip. The 1,200 cubic centimetres (73 cu in) machines are made by BMW Motorrad.

== Road safety bikes ==
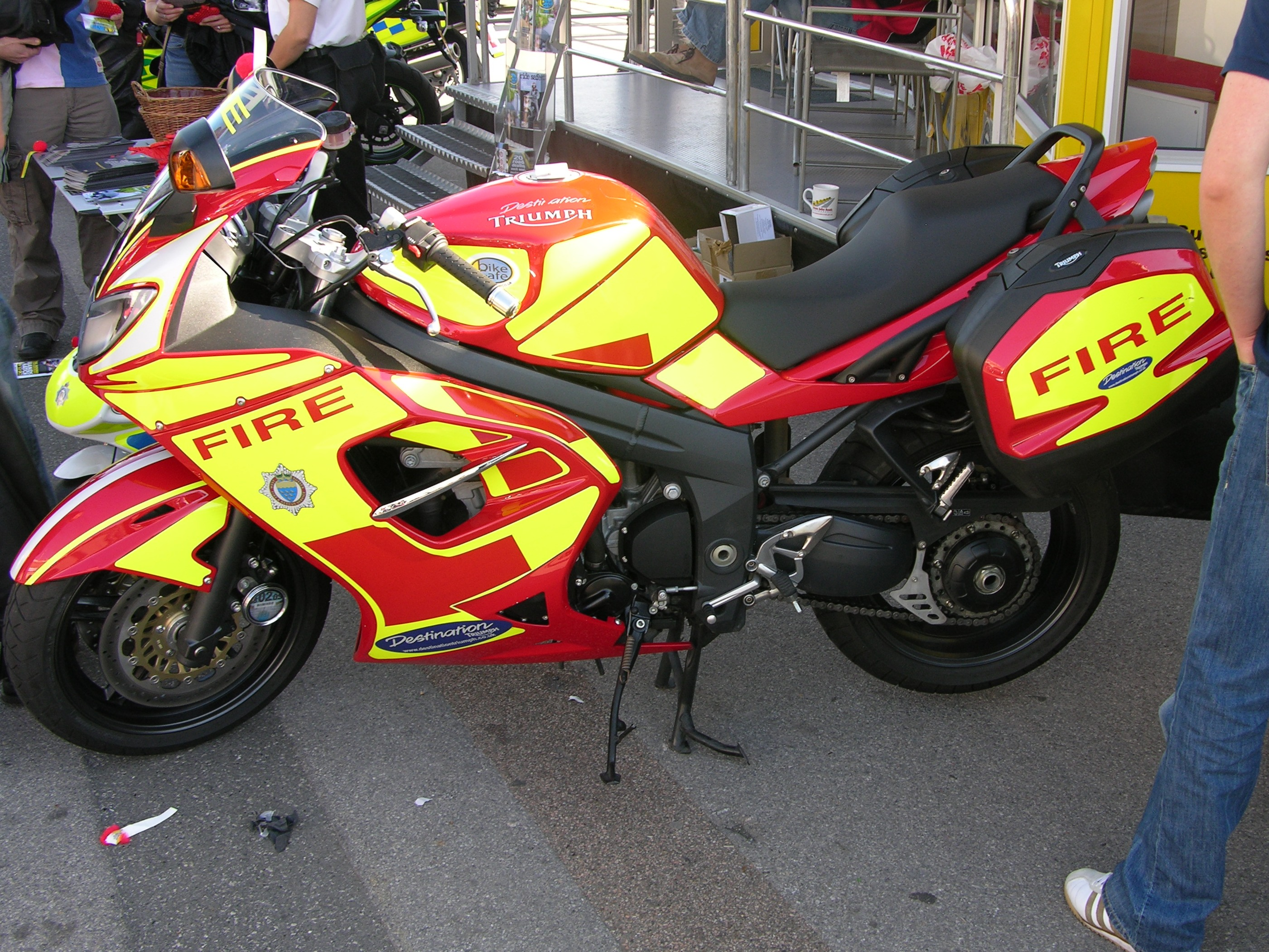
The Triumph Sprint ST 1050 fire bike of the West Sussex Fire and Rescue Service.

A number of UK fire services operate fire motorcycles to promote safe motorcycle riding. Painted in the highly visible fire service markings and colour schemes, and ridden by police-trained firefighters, they are used in road safety events such as the BikeSafe initiative, or taken to motorcycle events and popular biker gathering places, to engage with bike riders, on the theory that firefighters, rather than the police, are seen as more approachable by bike riders, and have specific knowledge of motorbike safety, having attended many motorcycle accidents.

In this education role, the West Sussex service operates two Triumph machines, while the North Wales service uses a Yamaha FJR1300. In the Kent service, they use a high-profile superbike as their fire motorcycle: a Honda CBR1000RR Fireblade, which has been sent to such events as the British Superbike Championship at Brands Hatch. Kent Fire Bike Team's aims are, whilst working both independently and in conjunction with partnership agencies including Kent Police, Highways Agency, KMT Road Safety org and SE Ambulance, to raise awareness of advanced training opportunities for bikers, to raise awareness of other road users about the vulnerability of bikers, to highlight the importance of correct attitude and equipment for bikers, and to represent biking and motorcyclists to the non-biking public.

== Northumberland medic and safety bike ==
The Northumberland Fire and Rescue Service use a BMW R1150 as their fire motorcycle. It was originally introduced as just a road safety motorcycle, but with the later addition of an automated external defibrillator (AED) and trauma care kit, it can now also be used as a response vehicle for road traffic accidents.

== See also ==
- Fire appliances in the United Kingdom
- Geography of firefighting
- Blood bike
- Motorcycle ambulance
- Police motorcycle
