= Carr Houses =

Coordinates: 53.526°N 3.018°W

- Hamlet
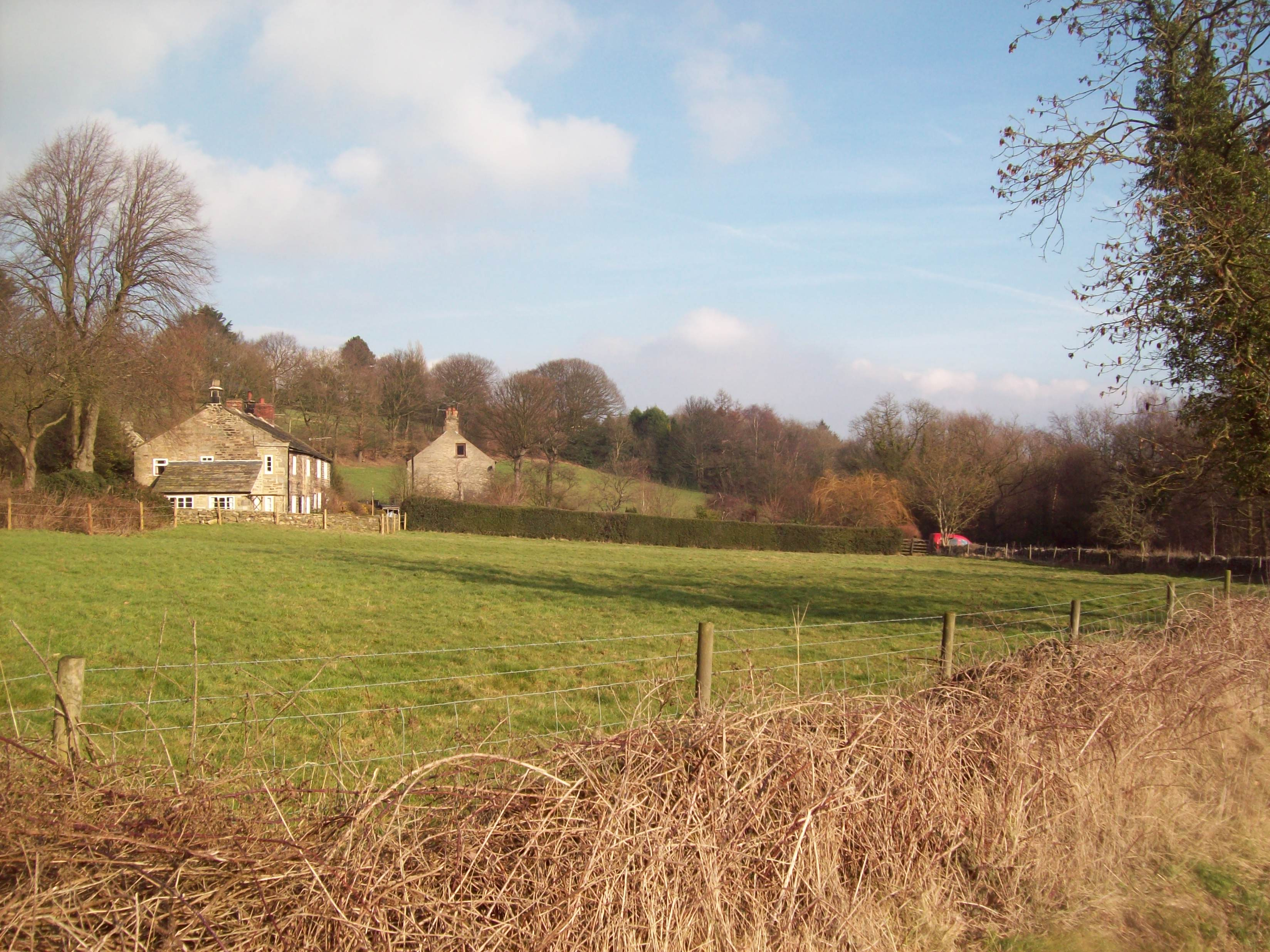
- Cliffe View and Carr Houses

- Location within Merseyside
- OS grid reference: SD320034
- Civil parish: Ince Blundell
- Metropolitan borough: Sefton
- Metropolitan county: Merseyside
- Region: North West
- Country: England
- Sovereign state: United Kingdom
- Post town: LIVERPOOL
- Postcode district: L38
- Dialling code: 0151
- Police: Merseyside
- Fire: Merseyside
- Ambulance: North West
- UK Parliament: Sefton Central

Carr Houses is a hamlet situated half a mile east of Ince Blundell, in Sefton, Merseyside, England. It is a traditional grouping of farm buildings built on medieval footings. Rigmaiden Farm and Cottage date back to the 17th century. Kiln Barn and Hare Barn have been renovated and converted into residential dwellings. Damson Cottage has also been renovated and was originally of cruck frame construction.
