= Fire appliances in the United Kingdom =

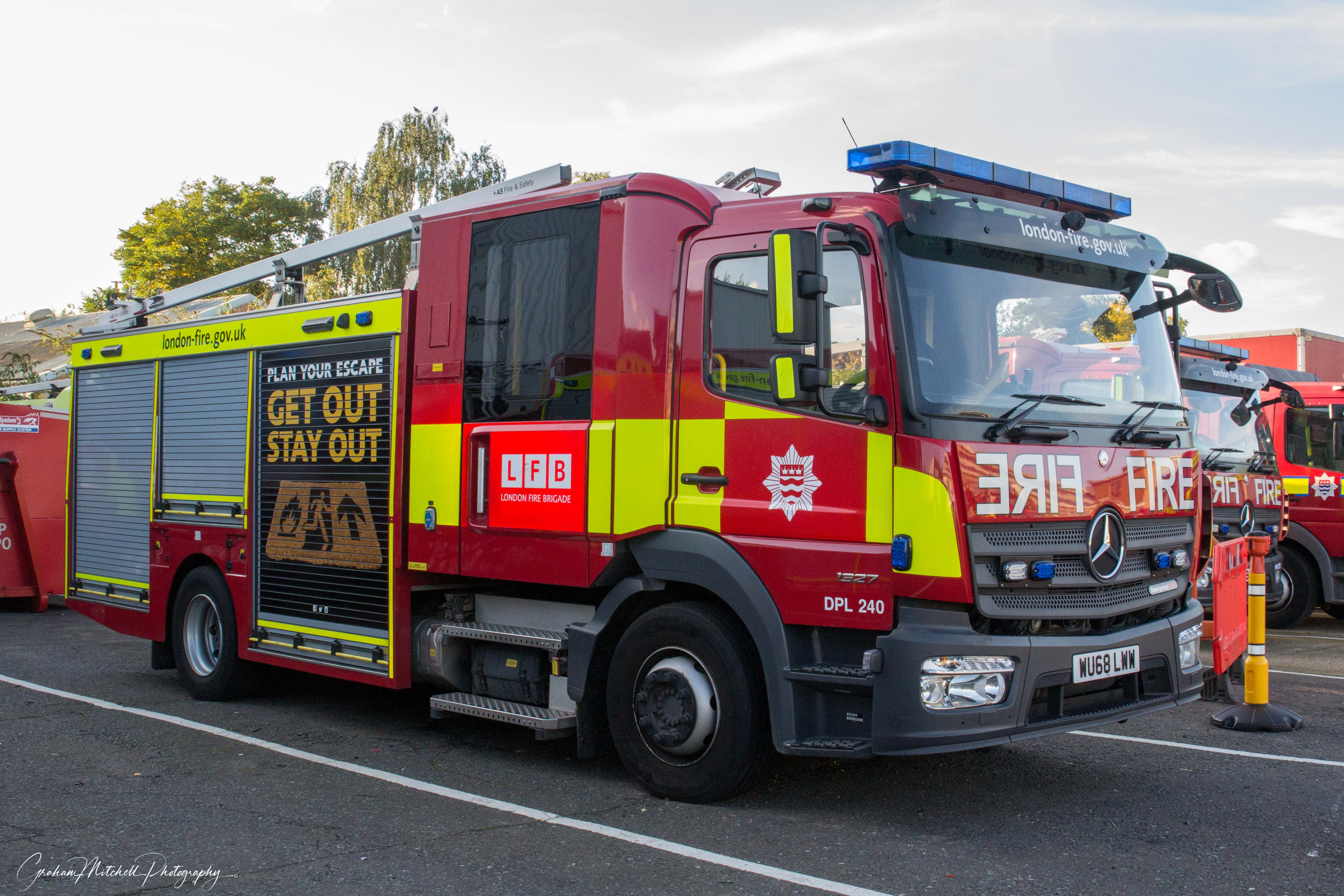
A pump ladder from the London Fire Brigade pictured in 2021

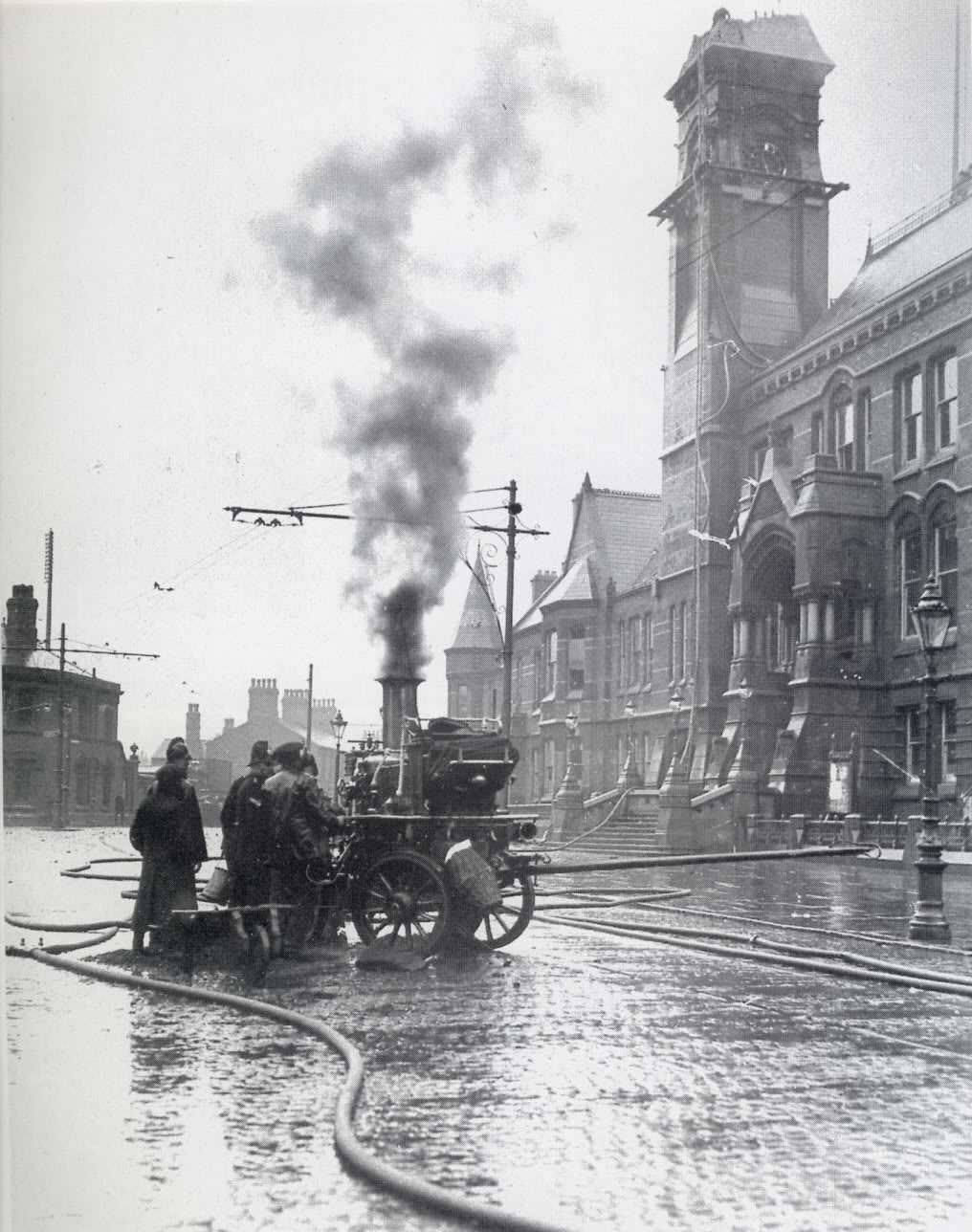
A steam pump truck in use in 1913, St Helens enabling fire-fighters to reach the burning clock tower. The limber for attaching to a horse team is visible stretching to the right.

Fire services in the United Kingdom use a variety of fire appliances, which perform a wide range of general and specialised roles and fit into several distinct categories. Contemporary fire appliances carry a multitude of equipment and firefighting media (such as water and foam) to deal with different types of emergencies ranging from fires, rescues, vehicle extrication, floods, salvage, casualty and trauma care.

The design and size of a fire appliance depends very much upon the role it is expected to perform. In general, most fire and rescue services use a standardised range of vehicles and equipment. However, airport fire services tend to use much larger and heavier appliances than those typically deployed by public fire services. Most front line fire appliances in the UK are marked in high conspicuity red and yellow battenburg markings, and are fitted with blue lights and sirens. Many appliances have roller shutter doors revealing compartments housing various items of equipment.

== Public fire and rescue services ==
Public fire and rescue services are those operated by fire and rescue authorities, and funded by council tax. Most fire appliances used by them are referred to as "domestic" type appliances to differentiate them from larger airport crash tenders. They are normally based on truck chassis and weigh over 12 tonnes, meaning they require an LGV licence to be driven. Some brigades use slightly smaller appliances based on gross vehicle weight of 7.5 tonnes, which do not require an LGV licence. They are common in rural brigades where narrow lanes and rough terrain would be difficult for a larger fire engine to negotiate.

=== Water tender ladder / pump rescue ladder / rescue ladder / rescue pump / pump ladder / water rescue tender ===
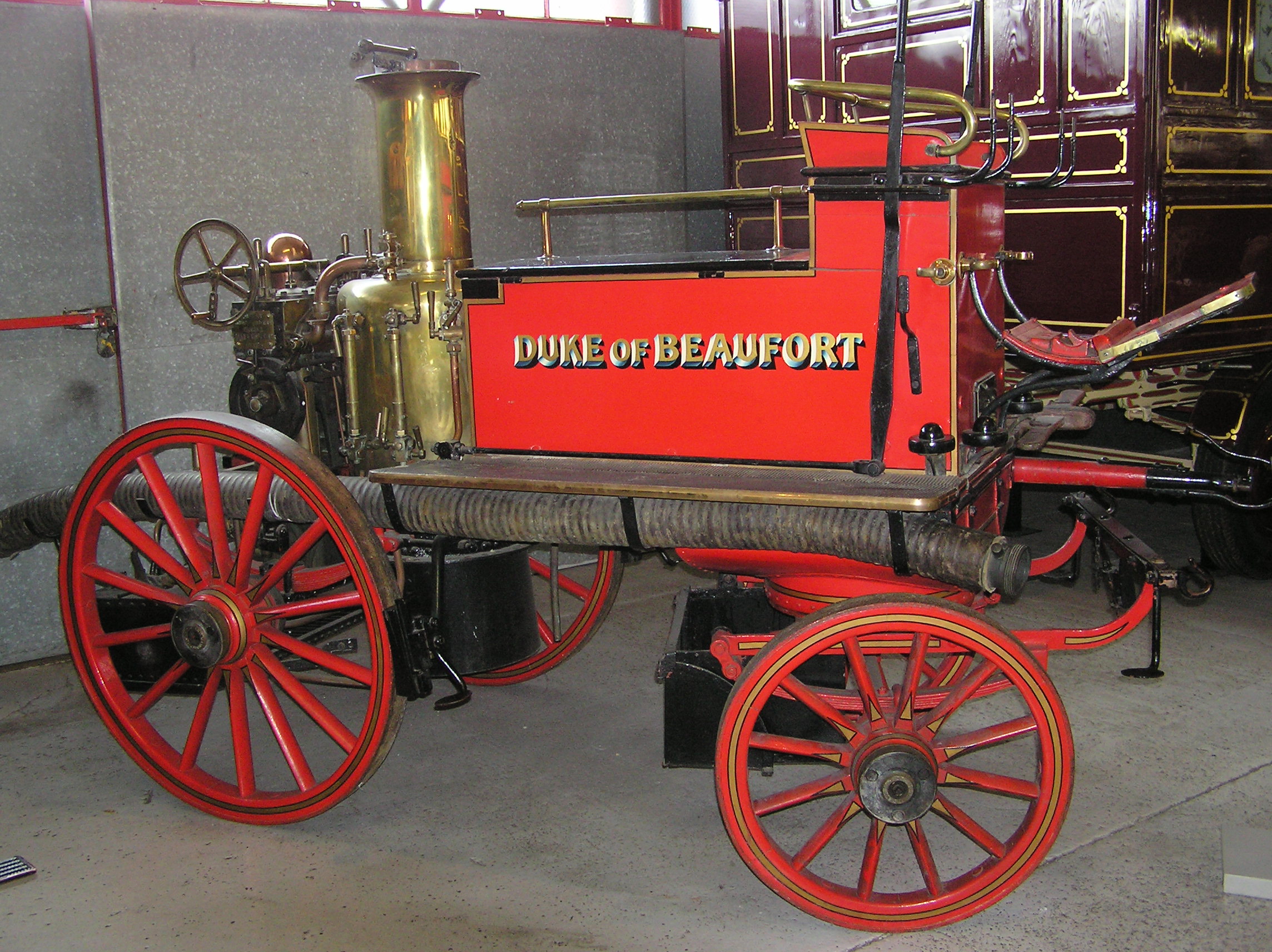
An early 20th century horse drawn fire engine on display in the Bristol Industrial Museum. This example used a double acting steam engine to pump water. It was used privately on the Duke of Beaufort's estate until 1939.

The most common front line appliance deployed to all emergency calls goes by a variety of names, including rescue ladder, pump ladder, water rescue tender, or slight variations on those names.

It is a general purpose unit capable of carrying and pumping water, carrying rescue and cutting equipment to deal with road traffic accidents and other rescue operations, a large ladder (for example 13.5 m (44 ft)) and several smaller ladders and roof ladders.

The appliance also carries breathing apparatus, lighting, tools, trauma care packs, water rescue gear, lines (ropes), hoses, and possibly chemical protection suits and foam. The vehicle will be crewed by four to six firefighters.

=== Water ladder / water tender ===
A water ladder or water tender is very similar to the aforementioned appliance, however with less emphasis on rescue gear and will usually carry a smaller ladder (for example 9 m or 10.5 m).

It is normally mobilised to augment and support the initial appliance or to respond to secondary, less urgent incidents. It is crewed by four to six firefighters.

=== Hydraulic platform ===
A hydraulic platform is a large appliance used for effecting rescue from high-rise structures.

It is essentially a large crane fitted with a caged platform which can be hoisted to heights well over 30 m (98 ft) in some cases. The platform may be raised to windows or balconies to rescue stranded persons.

The appliance is also capable of pumping water and as such occasionally these units are also used to direct water jets into a fire from an elevated position.

=== Light rescue pump ===
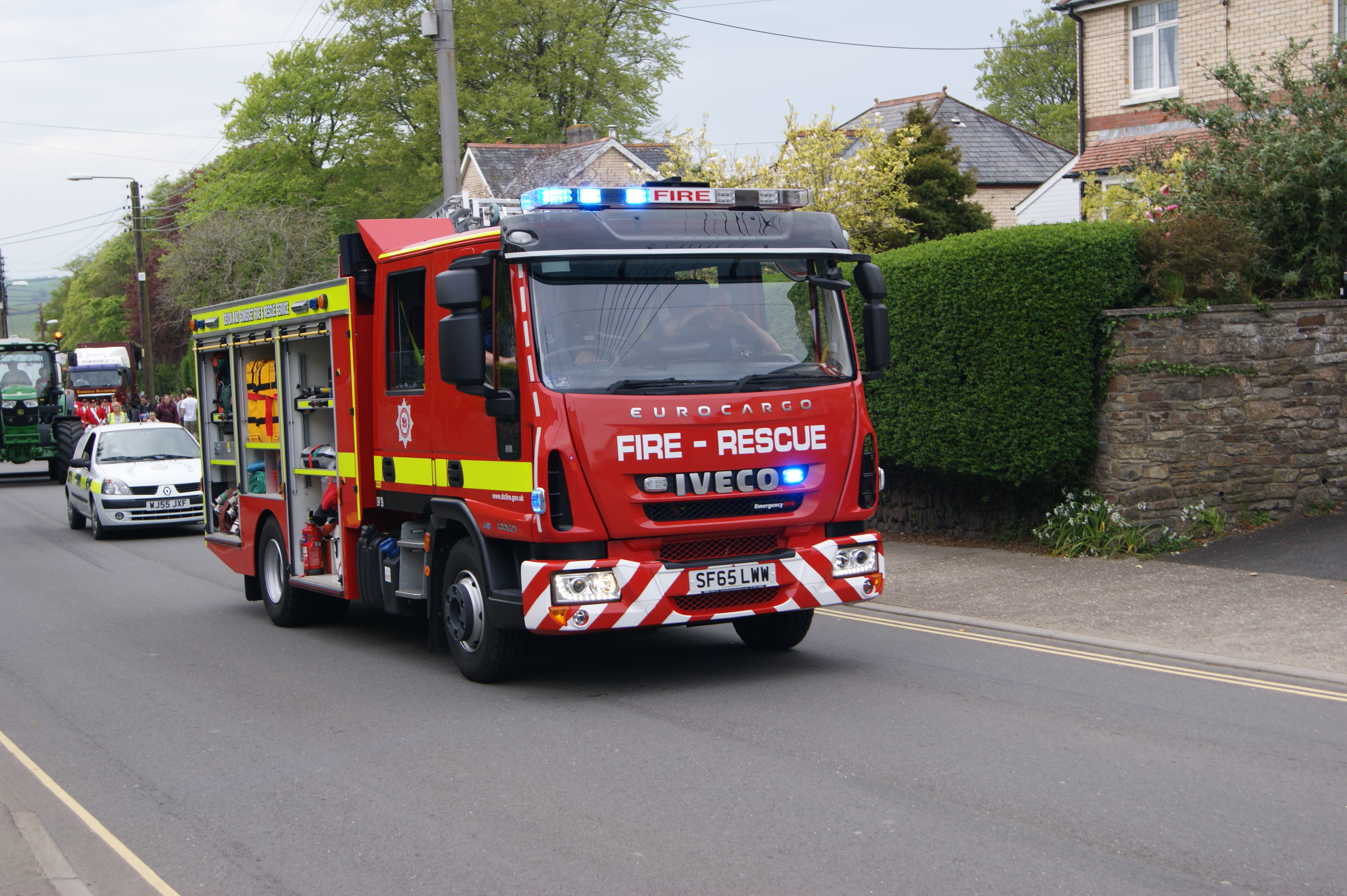
A light rescue pump from Devon & Somerset Fire and Rescue Service

These vehicles can vary from a converted van chassis to a purpose built fire appliance chassis. They often carry hydraulic rescue gear, 9 m or 5.8 m extension ladders and water. They are most often used as a second appliance in place of a pump rescue ladder or as a first appliance in its place in areas with small, tight roads.

=== Turntable ladder ===
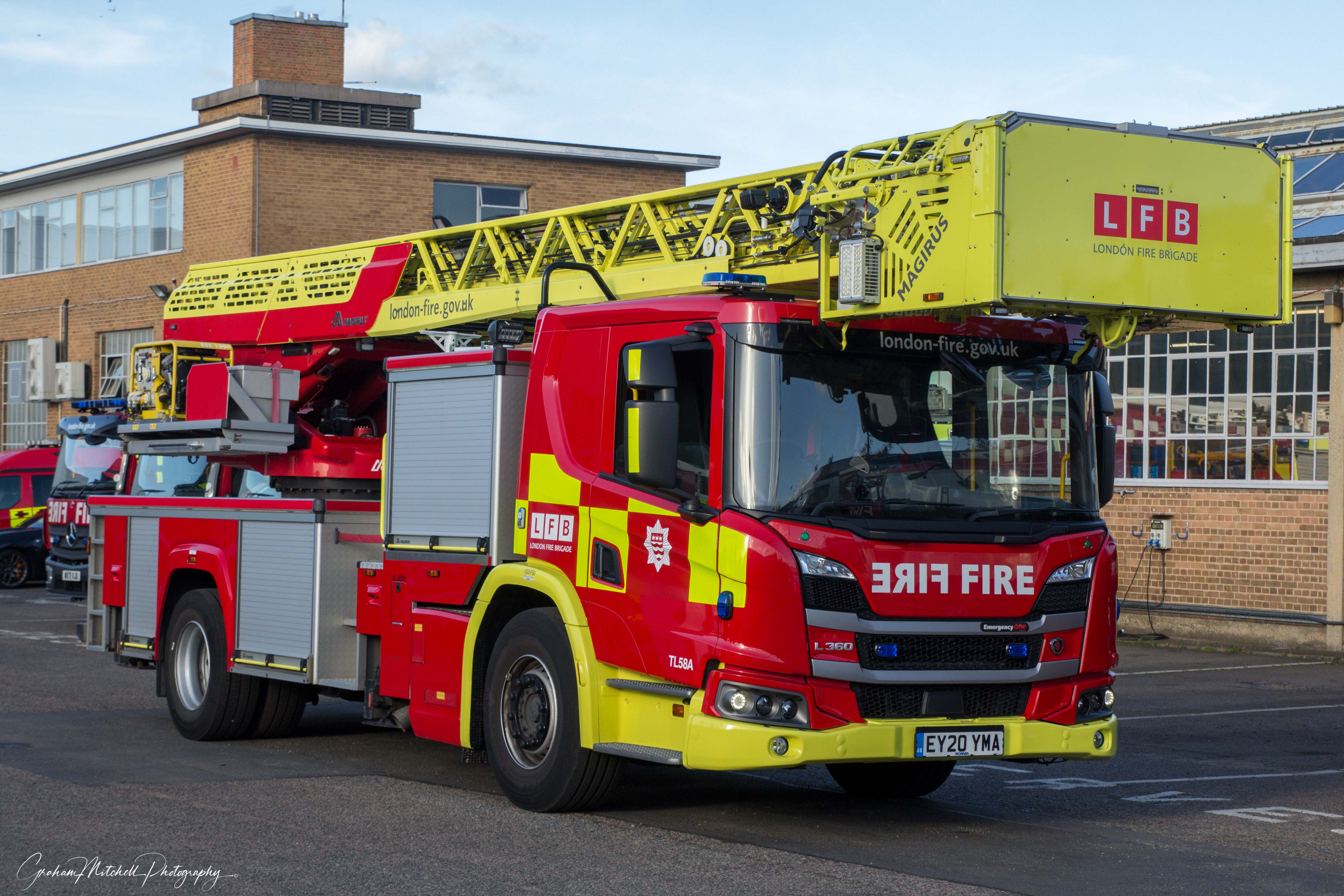
A 32M turntable ladder from the London Fire Brigade

A turntable ladder is similar in appearance to a hydraulic platform, however with a primary difference of instead of having a caged platform the turntable ladder is simply a large telescopic ladder, which can still be used to effect rescues from tall structures and pump water.

=== Aerial ladder platform ===
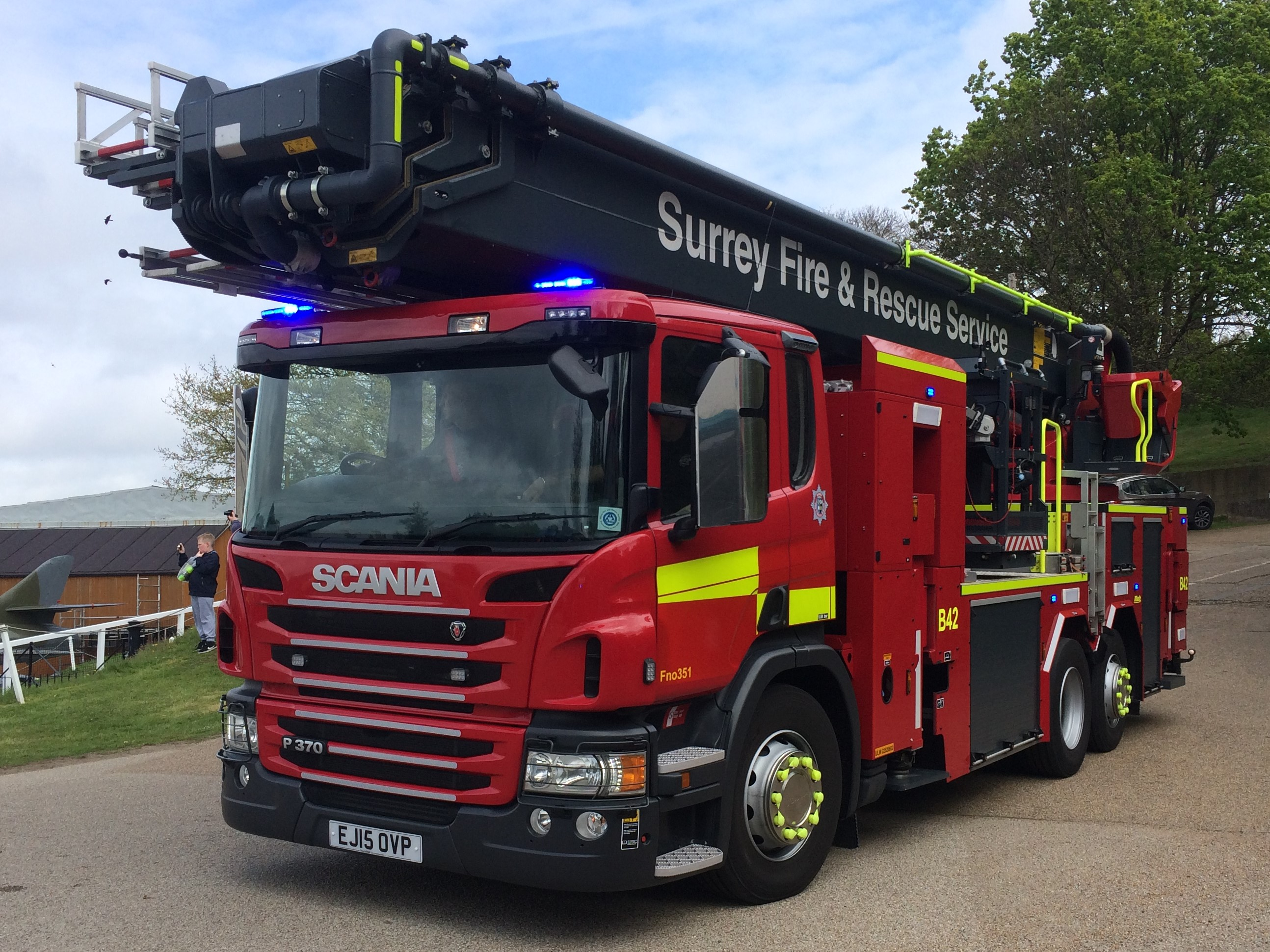
An aerial ladder platform from Surrey Fire and Rescue Service

An aerial ladder platform is designed to deploy an elevated master stream of water, or to provide a method of rescuing trapped persons, the 'knuckle' design of the arm of an aerial ladder platform means that it is very manoeuvrable for rescue situations. The vehicle also has a set of ladders alongside the main boom that can be used for access or escape in the case of boom failure while at height.

=== Light four-wheel drive pump ===
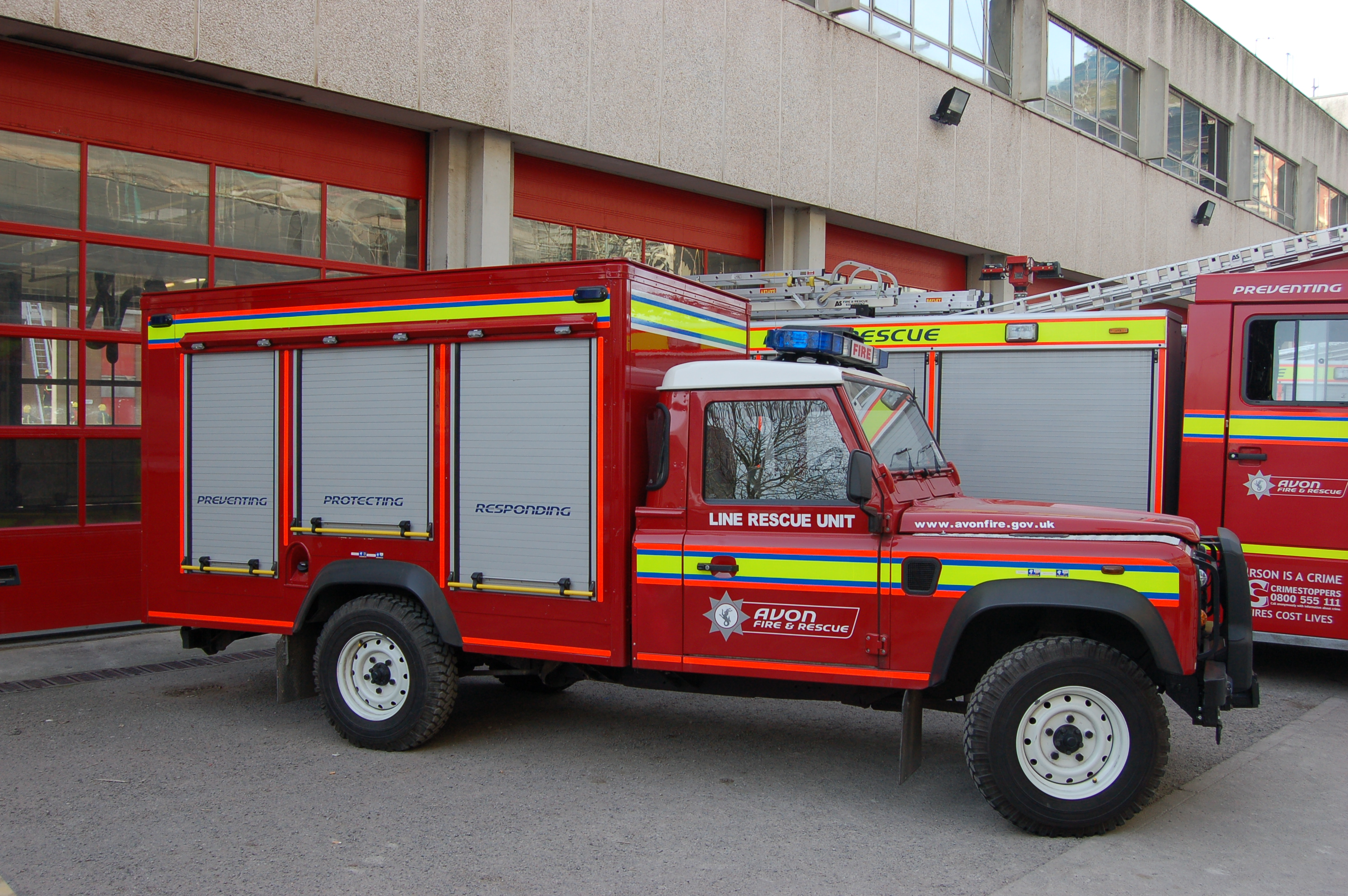
Four-wheel drive unit used for 'line' rescue duties in Bristol pictured in 2008

Light four-wheel drive pumps are a smaller version of the front line fire engine. They are usually used in rural locations where they can more easily negotiate tough terrain, narrow streets or remote access to certain areas.

They ordinarily carry a condensed quota of the equipment usually found on a normal-sized fire engine.

Light two-wheel drive pumps may also be used.

=== Rescue tender ===
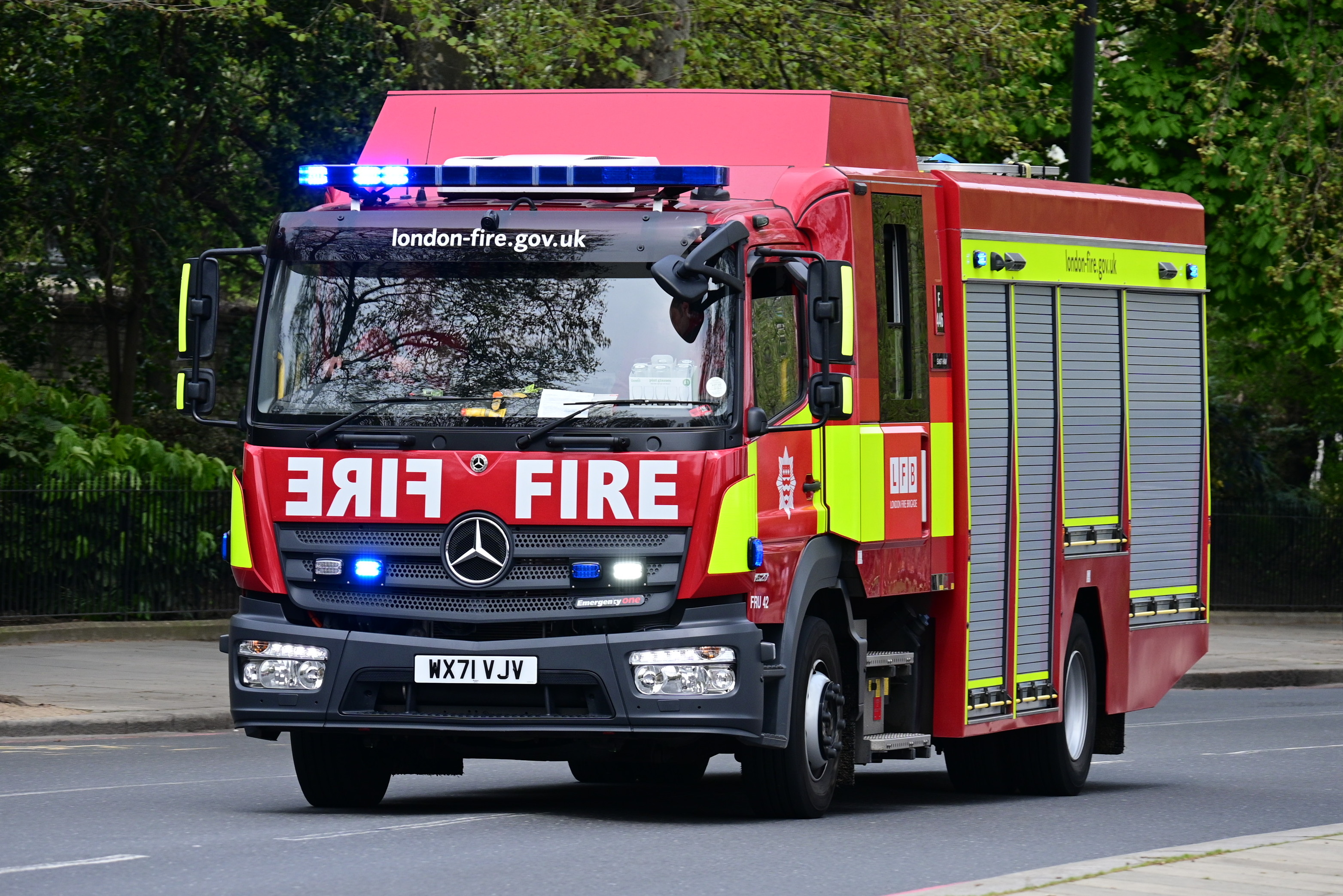
LFB rescue tender pictured in 2023

A rescue tender is a generic term for any fire appliance which carries out a "heavy" or "specialist" rescue role.

The equipment it carries varies depending on where it is deployed. It may carry heavy-duty cutting equipment for use at road traffic collisions or other transport incidents.

Water rescue and confined space rescue gear may also feature, as well as extensive lighting equipment and pneumatic airbags to lift heavy loads.

=== Operational support unit ===
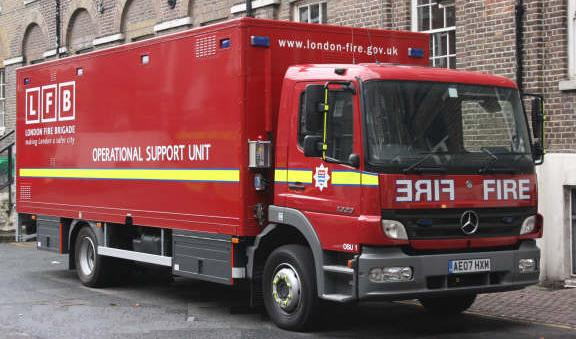
LFB operational support unit pictured in 2008

An operational support unit is a multi-role vehicle.

The term is interchangeable with other support appliances such as HazMat and chemical support, breathing apparatus tenders, hose layers, damage control tenders or decontamination units.

The vehicle carries equipment to support normal fire appliances and crews, typically at prolonged or major incidents.

==== Breathing apparatus tender ====
Breathing apparatus tenders carry extensive stocks of spare breathing apparatus (BA) cylinders at large incidents. They replenish cylinders which may have been used by firefighters tackling a protracted blaze or dealing with hazardous materials.

Some breathing apparatus tenders are also fitted with compressors which allow empty BA cylinders to be recharged on scene. Most also contain a mobile workshop so that BA sets can be repaired at the scene of incident so that they can be made available for use again at the incident within a very short period of time.

==== HazMat / scientific support unit / decontamination unit ====
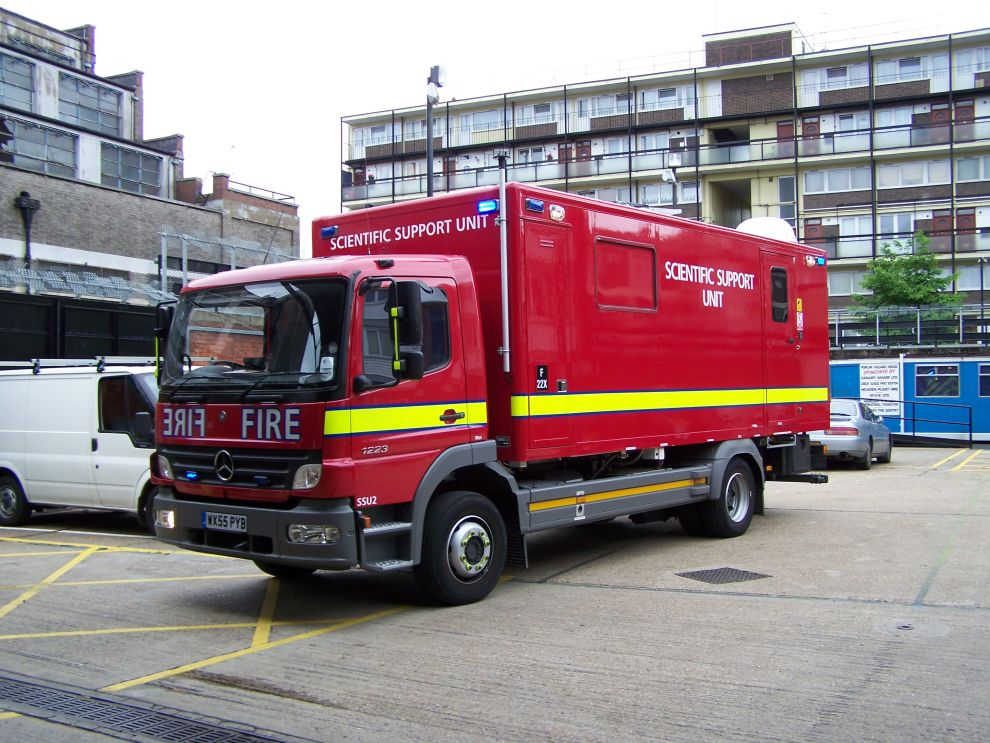
LFB scientific support unit pictured in 2007

These are specialised units equipped to deal with hazardous materials (HazMat) incidents.

Decontamination Units carry specialised equipment capable of decontaminating emergency workers and/or members of the public who have come into contact with HazMats. The equipment carried has many uses, some specific and technical in nature.

=== Command unit ===
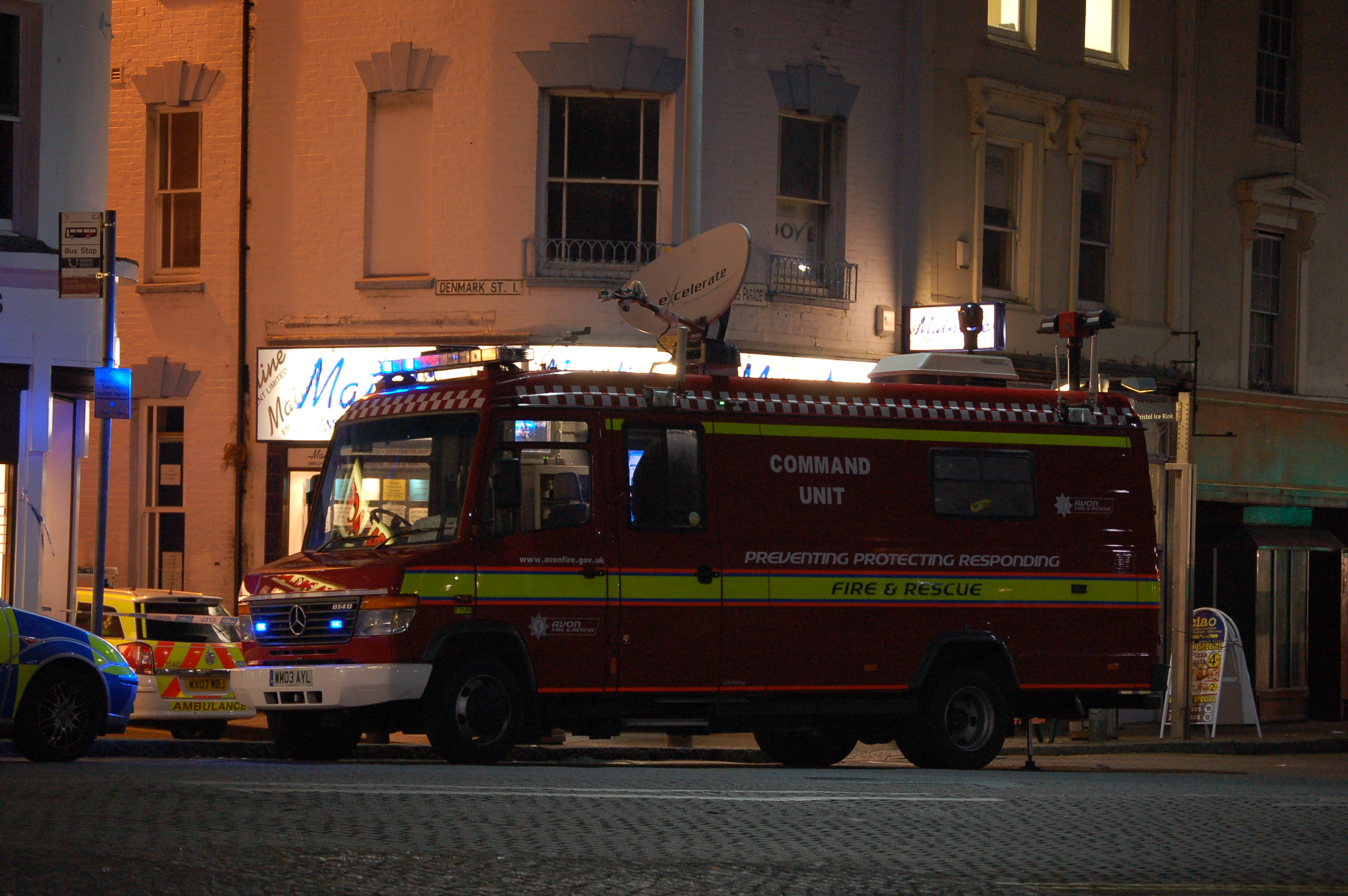
Avon's command unit pictured in 2009

The advancement of technology and potential for very large-scale incidents has led to more fire services using or increasing their use of mobile command units.

A fundamental advantage of such an appliance is to accommodate the many different types of communication equipment needed at major incidents. In addition to the wide range of radio frequencies used, fire chiefs often need to communicate via landlines and send and receive information via satellite links and CCTV of the ongoing situation.

The command vehicle can essentially be used as an on-site conference centre for command personnel, mapping and planning firefighting operations and booking-in and directing crews as they arrive.

=== Water carrier ===
Water carriers are tankers that are used to provide vast volumes of water to locations that may not have a nearby hydrant or open water supply. In some Fire and Rescue Services they also double as foam tenders.

=== Foam tender ===
Foam tenders carry large amounts of foam to be used at incidents where water is ineffective or cannot be used to tackle a blaze. They may take the form of a tanker, or a lorry carrying foam packets or barrels. In some fire and rescue services, water carriers serve as foam tenders, by dumping their regular load of water and replacing it with foam.

=== Welfare unit / mobile canteen ===
At large protracted incidents firefighters may be subjected to physically arduous work in inhospitable situations such as extreme heat. As such the welfare of firefighters is taken very seriously and ability to provide refreshments to sustain hydration and energy levels is paramount. This is where a welfare unit is mobilised.

=== Fire investigation unit ===
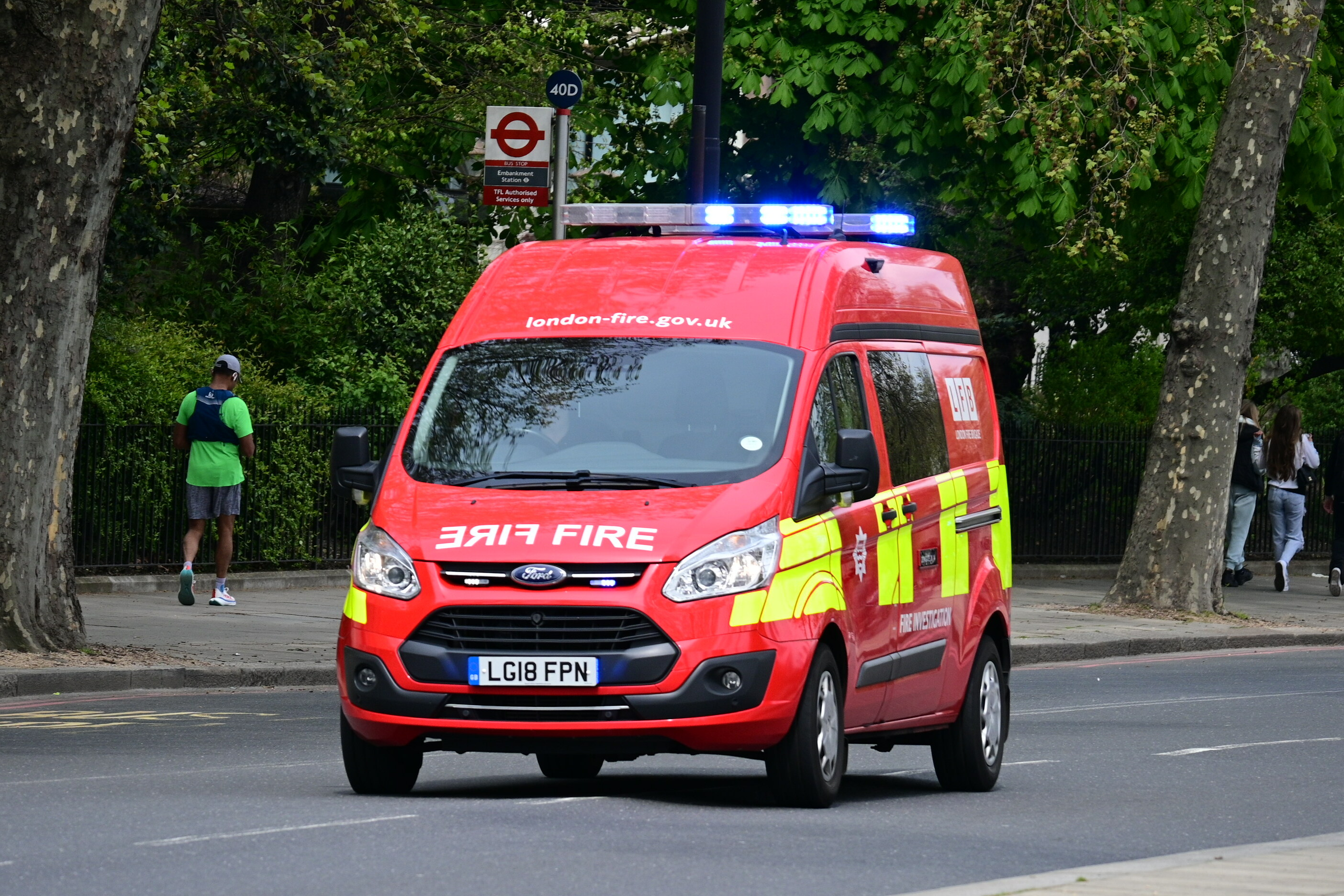
A London FIU pictured in 2023

A fire investigation unit attends fires and incidents where the cause is thought to be suspicious, and is crewed by specially trained experts, acting in assistance to police investigations. It may take the form of a car or van.

Some brigades may also use specially trained search dogs. At the scene of incidents, the dog wears specialist protective 'fire wellies' on his or her paws to guard against injuries from broken glass or hot material. The dogs can detect minute quantities of hydrocarbon accelerants within minutes. This procedure would normally take a human investigator - using specialist equipment - much longer, before samples can be taken away for scientific analysis.

=== New Dimension vehicles ===
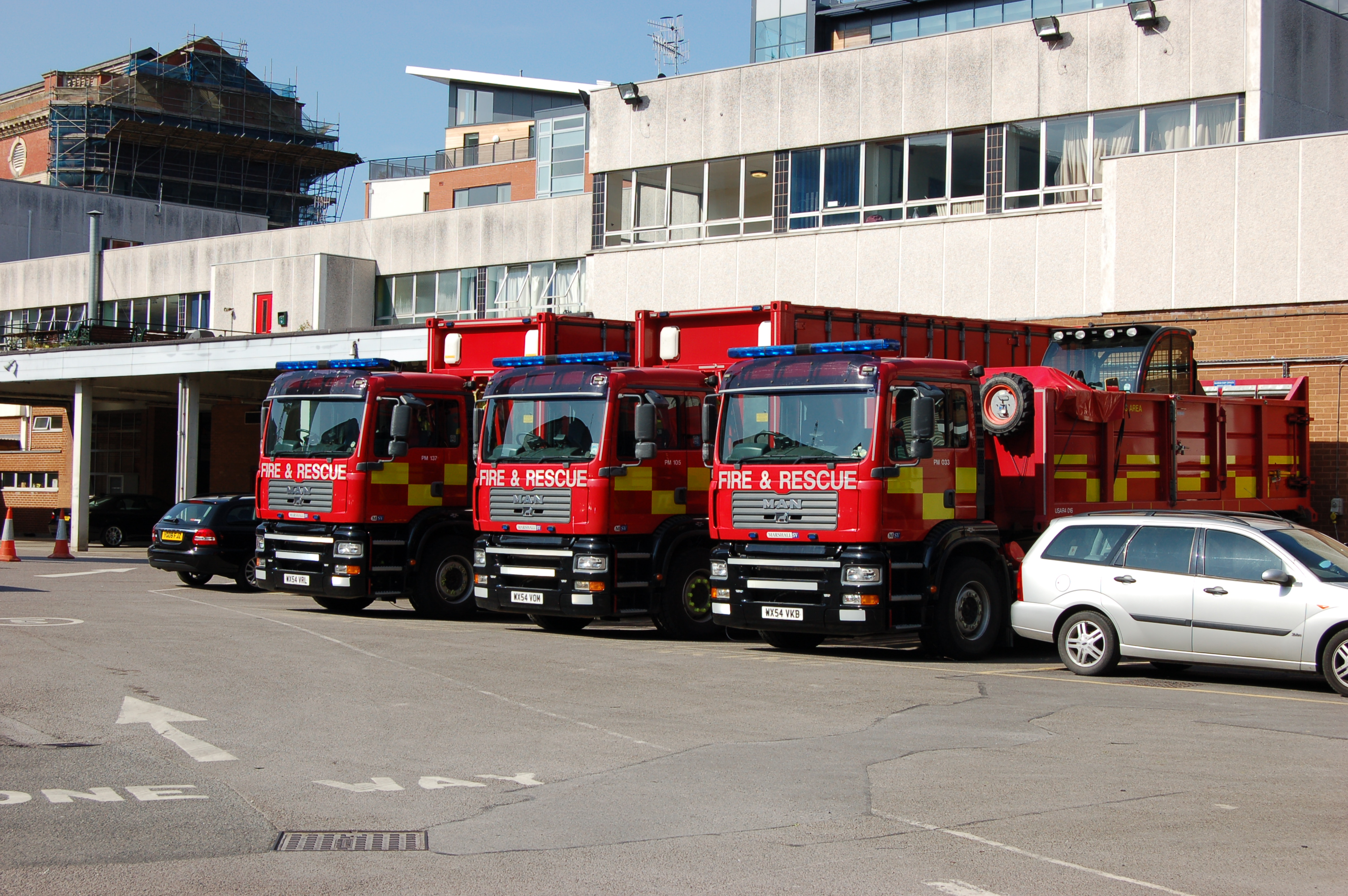
New Dimension vehicles of Avon Fire and Rescue Service pictured in 2009

New Dimension vehicles are large curtain-side trucks designed to be deployed at incidents involving chemical, biological, radiological, and nuclear (CBRN) materials or for urban search and rescue (USAR) use at the scenes of natural or large-scale disasters.

They do not pump water, but instead carry stocks of mass decontamination equipment, scene lighting, chemical protection kits, environmental protection equipment and general purpose rescue equipment. They are always on standby to be deployed if local resources may be overwhelmed.

The New Dimension vehicles are owned by the government, rather than the fire and rescue service and are stationed at strategic locations throughout the UK.

=== High volume pumps ===
High volume pumps are also part of the New Dimension scheme. They carry a submersible pump, supplying water from any open source to the fireground; a pump that pumps up to 8,000 litres (1,800 imp gal) per minute (twice as much as a standard fire engine); a hose box module; and ancillary equipment. This equipment is carried in a pod on the back of the vehicle, similar to goods on a flatbed truck. Because the vehicles are standard across the country, any high-volume pump vehicle can carry any pod, irrespective of the fire and rescue service the vehicle or pod is operated by. The pods are the same dimensions as the other New Dimension pods, so a vehicle that is used for high volume pump operations can carry a USAR pod.

They were used to great effect and in vast scale to assist operations at the Buncefield fire in Hertfordshire in 2005 and nationwide flooding in 2007.

=== Motorcycles ===
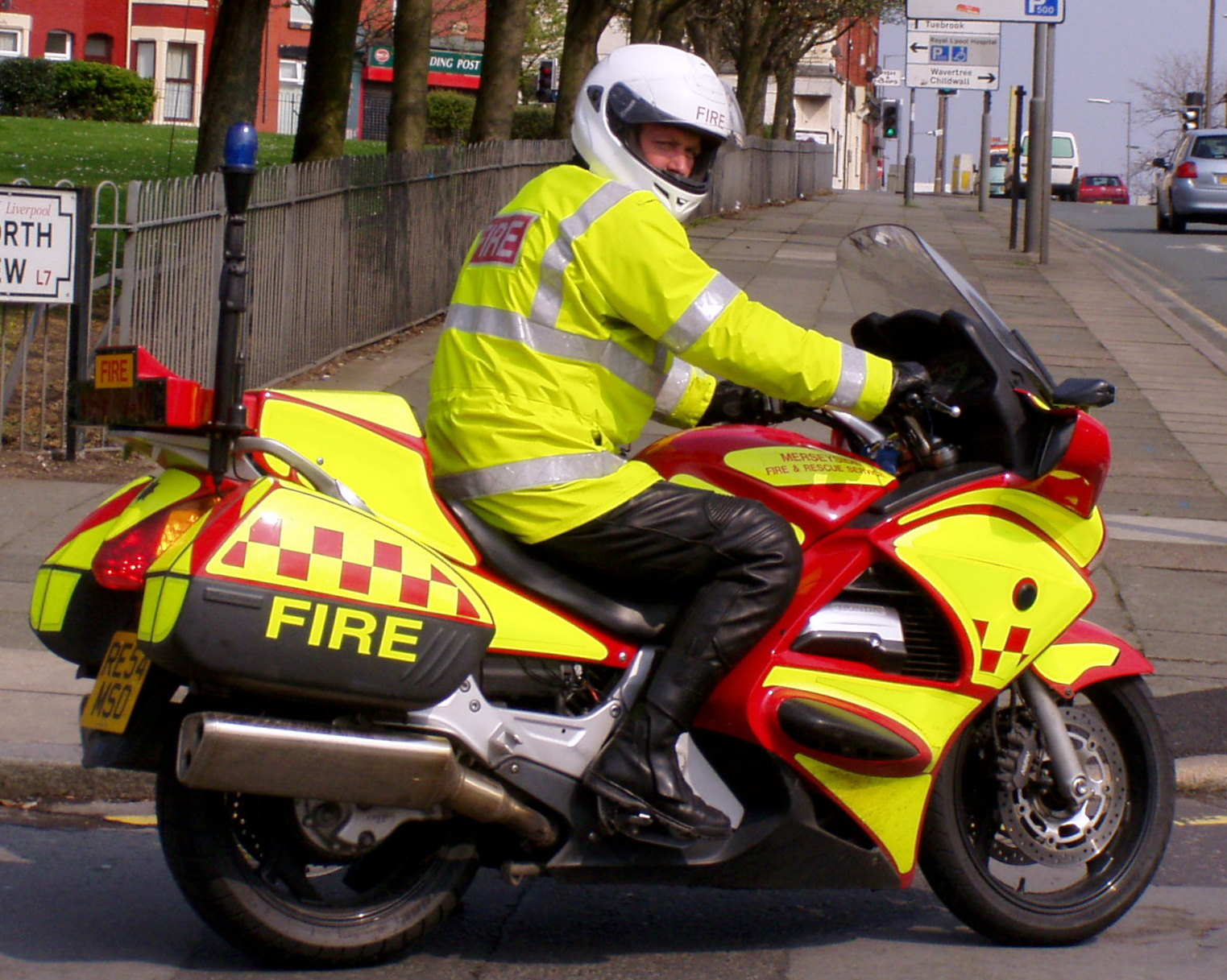
Fire bike with Merseyside Fire and Rescue Service pictured in 2009

In July 2010, the Merseyside Fire and Rescue Service began a six-month trial of two fire bikes to be used to fight small fires, freeing up main appliances. Merseyside has also deployed other bikes for various uses since 2005. Several UK fire services use fire bikes not for firefighting, but as motorcycle road safety awareness tools.

== Ministry of Defence fire services ==
The Defence Fire and Rescue Service and Royal Air Force Rescue and Firefighting Service operate numerous types of appliances, ranging from domestic-type tenders to airfield crash tenders, depending on the location they are serving.

== Fire and rescue vehicles in British overseas territories ==
Fire service vehicles in British overseas territories are, in most cases, similar to those used in the United Kingdom. They also usually employ the use of battenburg markings.
