= Ince Blundell =

Coordinates: 53.523°N 3.025°W

- Village
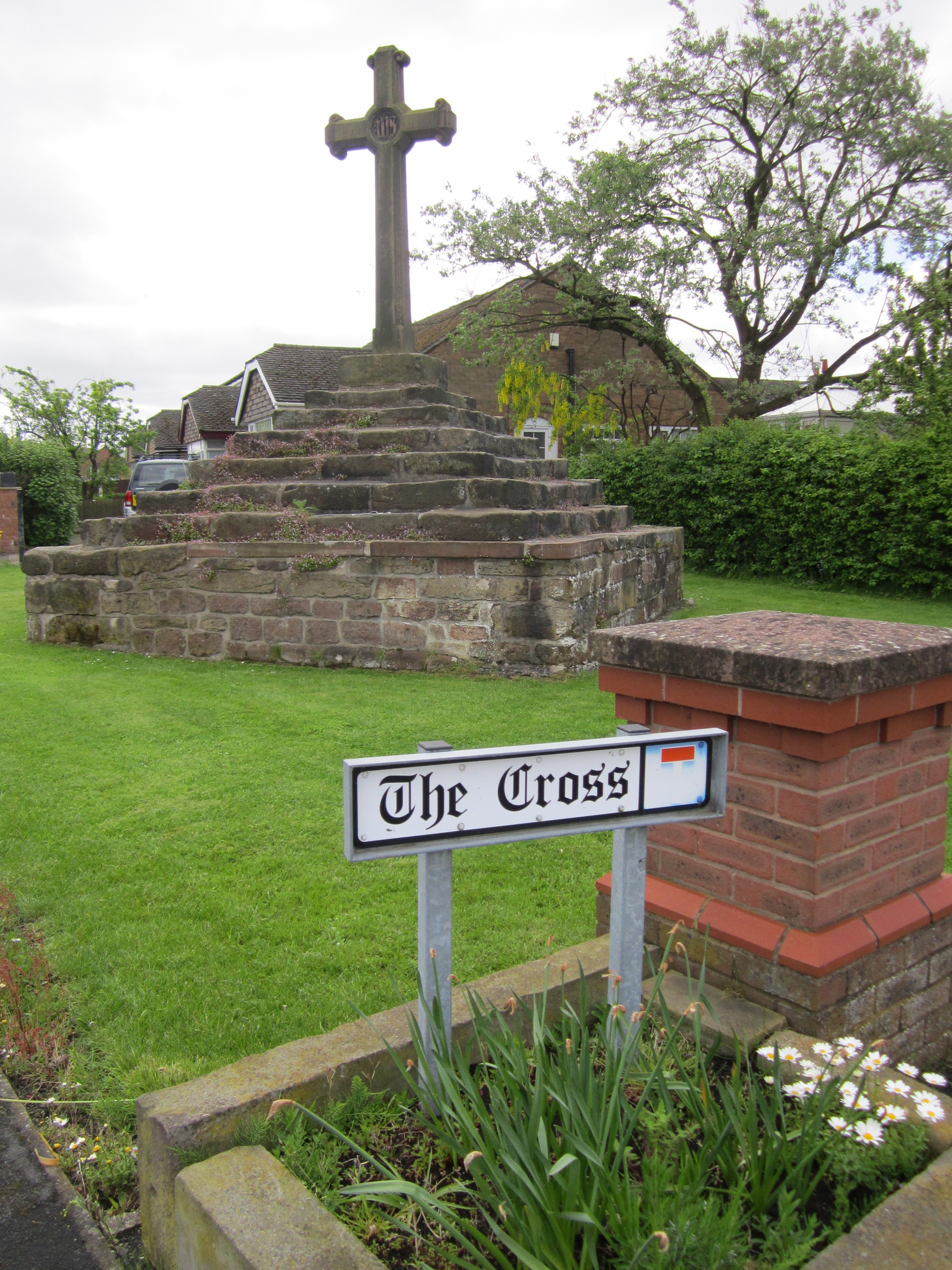
- The village cross

- Location within Merseyside
- Population: 516 (2011 census)
- OS grid reference: SD320034
- Civil parish: Ince Blundell
- Metropolitan borough: Sefton
- Metropolitan county: Merseyside
- Region: North West
- Country: England
- Sovereign state: United Kingdom
- Post town: LIVERPOOL
- Postcode district: L38
- Dialling code: 0151
- Police: Merseyside
- Fire: Merseyside
- Ambulance: North West
- UK Parliament: Sefton Central

Ince Blundell is a village and civil parish in the Metropolitan Borough of Sefton in the ceremonial county of Merseyside and historic county of Lancashire, England. It is situated to the north of Liverpool on the A565 road and to the east of the village of Hightown. There are two associated hamlets of Lady Green and Carr Houses.

== History ==
Ince Blundell is probably the oldest settlement within the Borough of Sefton. The name Ince comes from Hinne a Celtic word meaning "island in the marsh". This name bears evidence to Ince lying on a sandy ridge in the Alt valley, a place that in the past had been marshland.

In the 14th century, John Blundell, whose family were the predominant landowners in the area, added his surname to Ince. This was to distinguish it from the Ince in Cheshire and Ince-in-Makerfield near Wigan. Built from 1720, Ince Blundell Hall was the home of the Blundells of Ince, who became the Weld-Blundells, until 1959. The house is a Grade II* listed building, and is now a nursing home run by the Canonesses of Saint Augustine.

== Governance ==
From 1997 until 2010 the village and civil parish of Ince Blundell was part of the Knowsley North and Sefton East constituency represented by George Howarth, a Labour Party MP. As a result of boundary revisions for the 2010 general election the Knowsley North and Sefton East constituency was abolished with Sefton East, including Ince Blundell, being merged with the northern parts of the former Crosby constituency, which was also abolished, to form the new Sefton Central constituency which is represented by the Labour Party MP Bill Esterson.

For elections to Sefton Council, the village and civil parish of Ince Blundell is part of Ravenmeols electoral ward which has three councillors. Two are members of the Formby Residents Action Group (FRAG), Bob McCann (who also sits on the Ince Blundell Parish Council), Maria Bennett, and the third councillor, Nina Killen, represents the Labour party.

== Description ==
There is a village hall with a Tearoom attached, The Sunshine Tearooms, open Monday to Saturday. On the site of the old Weld Blundell Public house there is now a Euro garage with a Spar, Greggs and Starbucks attached. There is also a pub, the Pheasant, a short distance away at the other end of Orrell Hill Lane at its junction with Moss Lane.

In 2006 and 2007, Ince Blundell entered the North West in Bloom competition, part of the Royal Horticultural Society's Britain in Bloom campaign.

== Ince Blundell Hall statues ==
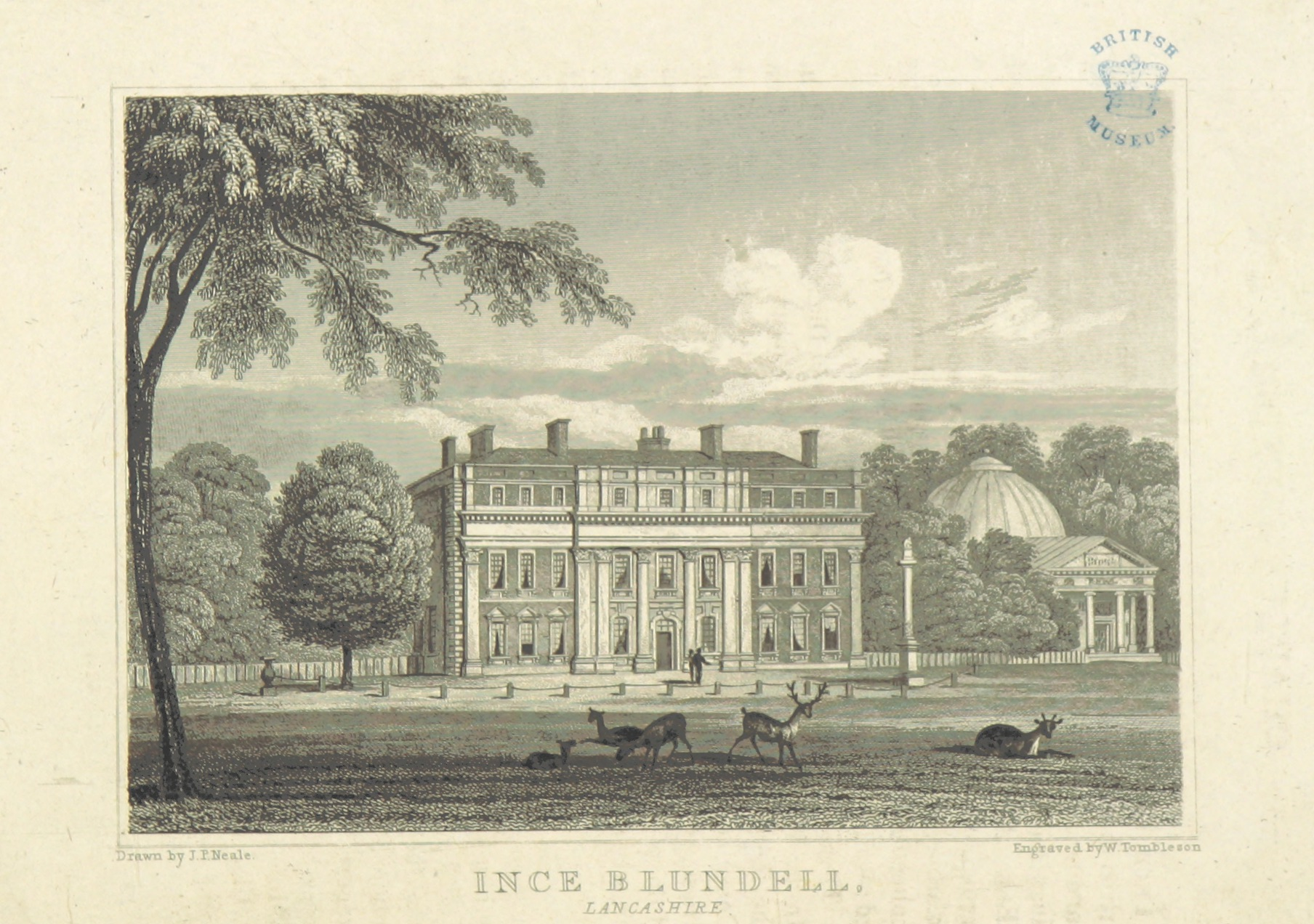
Ince Blundell Hall

Ince Blundell Hall was noted for the collection of marble statues from Ancient Rome and Ancient Greece, as well as 17th and 18th-century Italian sculptures by artists such as Carlo Albacini and Bartolomeo Cavaceppi. They were collected by Henry Blundell and housed first in a purpose-built Garden Temple (1792), and later in a scaled-down version of the Pantheon (1802–1804). The ancient sculptures, including some from Hadrian's Villa at Tivoli, are now located in the World Museum, Liverpool. Henry Blundell also collected paintings and furniture, some of which is also at the Walker Art Gallery. Henry's estranged son Charles Robert Blundell (1761–1837) made a large collection of drawings many of which are also at the Walker.

== See also ==
- Listed buildings in Ince Blundell
