= Lady Green, Merseyside =

Coordinates: 53.5251°N 3.0289°W

Lady Green
- Hamlet
- Location within Merseyside
- OS grid reference: SD320034
- Civil parish: Ince Blundell
- Metropolitan borough: Sefton
- Metropolitan county: Merseyside
- Region: North West
- Country: England
- Sovereign state: United Kingdom
- Post town: LIVERPOOL
- Postcode district: L38
- Dialling code: 0151
- Police: Merseyside
- Fire: Merseyside
- Ambulance: North West
- UK Parliament: Sefton Central

Lady Green is a hamlet half a mile east of Ince Blundell, in Sefton, Merseyside, England. It is a traditional grouping of farm buildings built on medieval footings.
