= Ince Blundell Hall =

Former country house in Merseyside, England

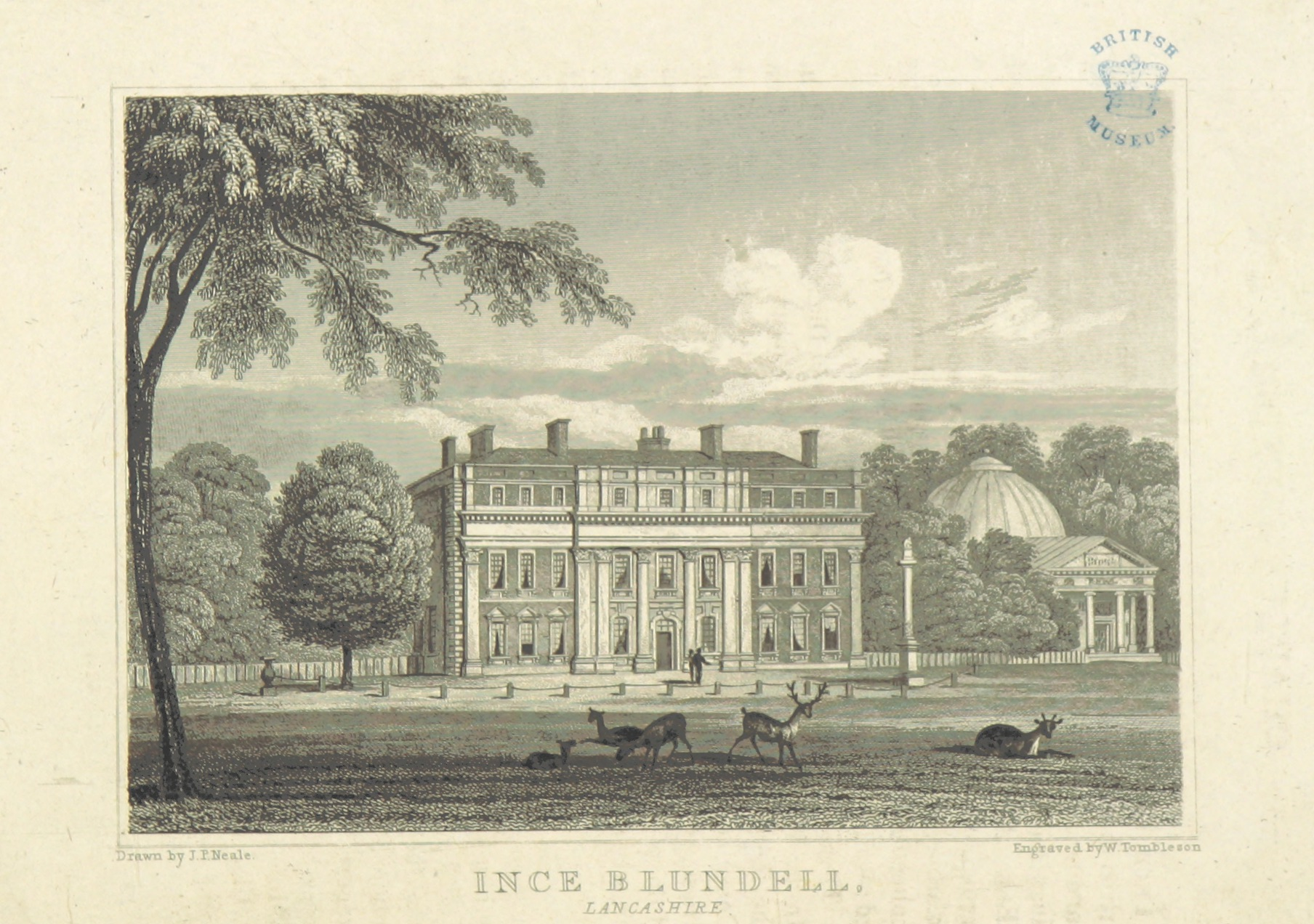
- The southeast front of Ince Blundell Hall in 1818

- Location in Merseyside

General information
- Architectural style: Georgian
- Location: Ince Blundell, Sefton, Merseyside, England
- Coordinates: 53.5190°N 3.0163°W
- Year built: c. 1720–50
- Renovated: 19th century (additions)
- Client: Robert Blundell
- Governing body: Canonesses of St. Augustine of the Mercy of Jesus

Design and construction
- Architect: Henry Sephton
- Designations

Listed Building – Grade II*
- Official name: Ince Blundell Hall
- Designated: 11 October 1968
- Reference no.: 1199254

Ince Blundell Hall is a former country house near the village of Ince Blundell, in the Metropolitan Borough of Sefton, Merseyside, England. It was built between 1720 and 1750 for Robert Blundell, the lord of the manor, and was designed by Henry Sephton, a local mason-architect. Robert's son, Henry, was a collector of paintings and antiquities, and he built impressive structures in the grounds of the hall in which to house them. In the 19th century, the estate passed to the Weld family. Thomas Weld Blundell modernised and expanded the house, and built an adjoining chapel. In the 1960s, the house and estate were sold again, and have since been run as a nursing home by the Canonesses of St. Augustine of the Mercy of Jesus.

The hall is Georgian in style, and consists of a main block with a service block linked at a right-angle to its rear. The hall is recorded in the National Heritage List for England as a designated Grade II* listed building. Some of the buildings associated with the hall are also designated at this grade; these are the Pantheon and the Garden Temple, both of which were built by Henry Blundell for his collection of statues, the chapel, and a building known as the Old Hall. In the garden and grounds of the hall are nine structures listed at Grade II; these include the stables, a monument, a sundial, gateways and a lodge, and the base of a medieval wayside cross.

== History ==
The manor of Ince Blundell was held by the Blundell family from the 12th century. The first documentation of the name of Blundell at the site is that of Richard Blundell in 1212. Following the Reformation the Blundells retained their Catholic faith and suffered from the consequent disadvantages and dangers. Nevertheless, by legal transactions and advantageous marriages the Blundell family acquired more possessions; by the end of the 18th century they held 15 manors together with other property, some of it as far away as Liverpool and Preston.

The present house was built by Robert Blundell (1700–73) who inherited the estate in 1711. Building began in about 1720, and it was finished by 1750. The house was designed by Henry Sephton, who was the "leading mason-architect in the area" at that time. In 1761 Robert Blundell moved from the house to Liverpool, and the estate passed to his eldest son, Henry (1724–1810). Henry then started to extend the house by adding what he described as "a large body of offices" at right-angles to the main block, and he did this "without the help of a Wyat (sic) or any architect". In the grounds he designed and built a stable block and greenhouses, created a kitchen garden, and landscaped the park, which included a lake and a ha-ha. He built a wall around the perimeter of the estate, and designed one, and possibly two, of the gateways.

Henry Blundell was a collector, first of paintings and later of statues and antiquities, (Note: Most of the paintings have been sold, and the collection of antiquities was given to the National Museums Liverpool where some of them are on show in the Walker Art Gallery.) the collection amounting to over 500 items. In order to house them at Ince Blundell, he constructed a series of buildings in the grounds of the hall. Initially he kept his collection in a series of greenhouses, but in about 1790–92 he built the Garden Temple, a building in Classical style. This was followed in about 1802–05 by a more impressive building, the Pantheon, its design based on the Pantheon in Rome. When Henry died in 1810, the hall passed to his son, Charles. He died childless in 1837, and the estate passed to Thomas Weld, a cousin. He took the name of Thomas Weld Blundell, and restored, refurnished and redecorated the hall. In the mid-19th century a large bay window was added to the west side of the drawing room, and a new dining room was built at the east end. Ceilings were raised, and interior decoration was carried out by the firm of Crace. Weld Blundell added a new vestibule to connect the gallery, the dining room, and the Pantheon. The portico of the Pantheon became the new main entrance to the hall, and the Pantheon itself the reception hall. What had been the original chapel became the organ loft of a new large two-storey chapel designed by J. J. Scoles.

During the Second World War the hall, its buildings and park were used by the War Office and the Admiralty, and additional buildings were erected. Five parachute bombs fell near the hall, one of them blowing out all the windows in the garden front. By 1960 the estate was "seriously dilapidated", and it was decided to sell the hall and the surrounding land. The farms went to the sitting tenants, and the chapel, which had been used as a parish church since 1947, was given to the Archdiocese of Liverpool. The hall was bought by the Canonesses of St. Augustine of the Mercy of Jesus, who adapted it for use as a nursing home. It was officially opened as such on 27 May 1961 by the Rt Revd John Heenan, who was at that time the Archbishop of Liverpool. Much work had to be done to make the building fit for its new purpose, including making it weather-proof, installing central heating, a lift, and a washbasin in each bedroom. A new entrance was created at the back of the hall, with access for wheelchairs. The former gallery was converted into a chapel for the use of staff and residents. Henry Blundell's wing is used partly to provide services for the hall, and partly by the sisters as a convent. The sisters and staff of the hall continue to provide nursing and other care for the elderly.

== Architecture ==
=== Exterior ===
Ince Blundell Hall is in Georgian style. It is constructed in brick with sandstone dressings, and has an L-shaped plan. The main block faces southeast; it is in two storeys with an attic, and has a front of nine bays. Richard Pollard and Nikolaus Pevsner describe the front as being in late English Baroque style, and consider that it was "evidently inspired" by the front of Buckingham Palace, London. Between the upper storey and the attic is an entablature with a cornice and a panelled parapet. The central three bays project forward, the lower storeys are flanked by pairs of giant pilasters, and at the sides of the central doorway are giant columns. There are more pilasters at the ends of the building, and in the central three bays of the attic. All the pilasters and columns are Corinthian in style. The windows are sashes and are surrounded by architraves. The ground floor windows in the central bays have segmental heads with keystones, and those in the outer bays have friezes and pediments carried on consoles. Below the upper floor windows are panelled aprons and consoles. The central doorway has a segmental head and a keystone carved with the Blundell arms. At the corners of the front are quoins.

To the right of the main block is a 19th-century single-storey wing with five bays, the central three of which are canted. Behind is a single-storey block, linking the main block to the service block, which is at right angles to the rear. The service block is Henry Blundell's "offices", and is in Palladian style. It faces southwest, is in two storeys, and has a seven-bay front, plus a three-storey three-bay pavilion to the right. The central three bays of the service block project forward under a pediment. Above the central porch is a Diocletian window. There is a clock in the gable, and over the pediment is a cupola carried on Tuscan columns. The windows are sashes with wedge lintels. The central bay of the pavilion is round-headed and recessed, and its windows are a mixture of Diocletian, tripartite, and oculi.

=== Interior ===
When the house was first built, the main entrance was through the centre of the southeast face, which led into an entrance hall. Following the alterations carried out by Weld Blundell in the 19th century, the portico of the Pantheon became the new main entrance. When the house was converted into a nursing home, a new entrance was created at the rear. At the time the Weld Blundell family moved from the house, the entrance hall was used as a library, the drawing room was to the left, and a billiard room to the right. To the right of this was the dining room, and behind it was the gallery. The billiard room has become the music room, the former library is a lounge for the residents, and the former gallery is the chapel for the staff and residents.

The interior of the house has retained much of the decoration carried out by Crace. The ceiling contains Rococo plasterwork dating from about 1750 depicting symbols relating to music and hunting, together with representations of learning and cultivation. On the walls are paintings by Crace. Pollard and Pevsner refer to these as being "delicately pretty Raphaelesque decoration". The former entrance hall is "small, simple and sober", and the Staircase Hall behind it is "not a grand space at all". The dining room, also decorated by Crace, contains oak panelling on the walls, and painted panels in the ceiling. The oak fireplace replaces the original marble fireplace that was removed when the Weld Blundell family left the house. There is also a scheme of Crace decoration in the former gallery.

== Associated structures ==
=== Pantheon ===
The Pantheon is at the angle between the main block and the service block. It is built in stone with a lead dome and has a circular plan. On the southeast side is an Ionic portico with four columns, a frieze, and a cornice. On the exterior are niches and panels with reliefs. Inside is an Ionic pilastrade, a frieze decorated with triglyphs and roundels, and niches for statues, four of which are in the shape of Venetian windows. The interior of the dome is coffered, and it has a central glazed oculus, which is the only source of lighting for the building.

=== Garden Temple ===
The Garden Temple, which is in the form of a temple, stands in the grounds to the south of the hall. It was probably designed by William Everard, and it was restored in about 2000. The building is mainly in stuccoed brick with stone dressings, and has a hipped roof. On the front is a Tuscan portico with four columns, reliefs, and busts, and in the pediment is a mask. The frieze contains a Latin inscription, which translates as "In this place it is summer and winter all year round", (Note: In Latin, the inscription reads "HIC VER ASSIDUUM ATQUE ALIENIS MENSIBUS AESTAS".) referring to the fact that the building was heated by air from external fireplaces. Behind the portico is a three-bay palistrade, and a central entrance flanked by niches and with a relief above. Inside there are recesses for statues, two in the shape of Venetian windows. Some Roman masks and relief panels have been set into the walls.

=== Old Hall ===
Despite its name, this was not the previous hall, as the present hall was built on the site of the older hall. Its original purpose is unknown, and in the 19th century it was used for drying hops. The building stands in the grounds to the southwest of the hall. It is in brick with stone dressings, and has a roof partly of stone-slate and partly of slate. The building has three storeys and a front of five irregular bays. The windows are mullioned, and the entrances have quoins and large lintels with slight Tudor arches.

=== Church of the Holy Family ===
The church is at right angles to the north end of the service block. It was originally the family chapel, and has since been used as a Roman Catholic parish church. It was built in 1858–60 and designed by J. J. Scoles. The church is in brick with stone dressings and has a slate roof. The exterior is relatively plain, but the interior is elaborately decorated, some of which may have been executed by Crace; there are also paintings by Gebhard Flatz.

=== Stables ===
The stables are in the grounds to the southwest of the hall. They were built in about 1800–14, and are in brick with stone dressings and a hipped slate roof. The stables are in two storeys and have a nine-bay front, the central three bays projecting forward under a pedimented gable. In the centre is a recessed round-headed entrance with angle pilasters, an archivolt, and a keystone. Above this is a Diocletian window. Elsewhere the windows in the ground floor are sashes with wedge lintels, and those in the upper storey are oculi. There are more round-headed recesses in the end bays, and a 20th-century garage to the north.

=== Garden structures ===
In the garden to the south of the main block is a monument in the form of a marble Tuscan column on a stone plinth. It carries an eagle, and dates from the early 19th century. To the southwest of the hall is a sundial dated 1741. This consists of a stone baluster, and its metal plate is missing. Further to the southwest is an octagonal structure built into the wall of the kitchen garden. It is in stuccoed brick with a slate roof, and has a round-headed entrance and a keystone decorated with an acanthus. This flanked by recesses, and there are more recesses inside. Also within the grounds of the hall is the base of a medieval wayside cross, which is a scheduled monument.

=== Gates and lodge ===
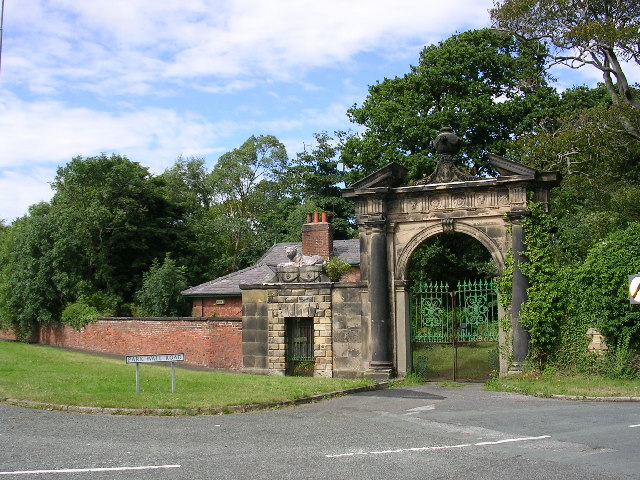
Lion Gate

The most impressive entrance to the grounds is the Lion Gate on the A565 road to the south of the hall. It was designed by Henry Blundell in the 1770s, its Baroque style design copied from a gateway in the background of one of his paintings, the Marriage of Bacchus and Ariadne by Sebastiano Ricci. The gate is constructed in sandstone and consists of a central round-arched entrance and two flat-headed pedestrian entrances. The central entrance is in Doric style with columns, and an entablature with a triglyph frieze including bucrania and rosettes. On the top is a broken pediment containing a cartouche and an urn decorated with ram's heads and festoons. The pedestrian entrances have rusticated surrounds. Above one is a statue of a lion, and above the other is a lioness. The entrances contain cast iron gates. The East Gate dates from the 1770s, and was probably also designed by Henry Blundell. It has a round-headed central entrance and flat-headed pedestrian entrances, and is simpler than the Lion Gate. The central entrance is flanked by Ionic pilasters, there is a fluted frieze with a decorated central panel, and a pediment. Above the pedestrian entrances are tented caps decorated with festoons and rosettes.

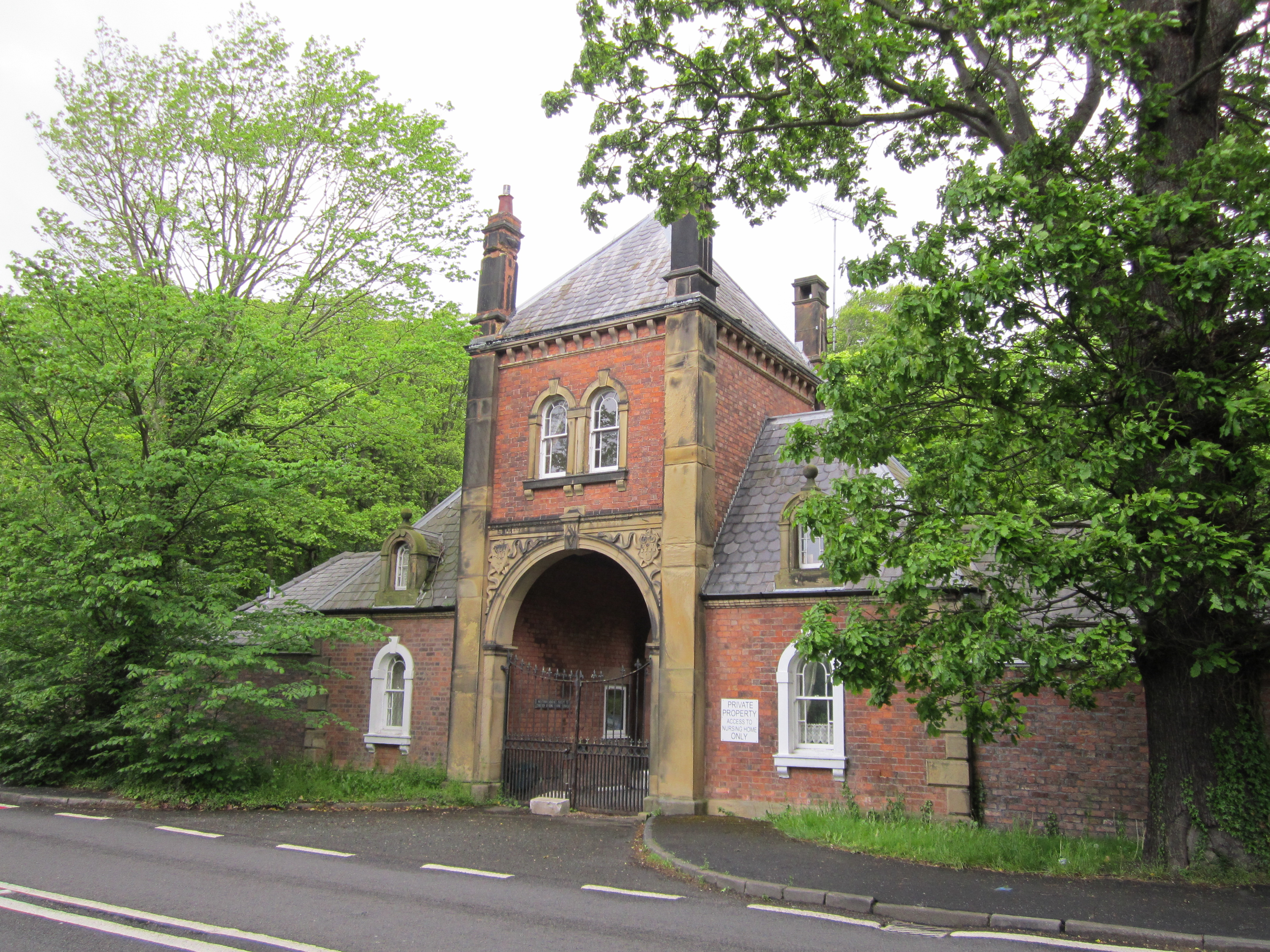
West Lodge

The West Lodge, also on the A565 road, is to the north of the Lion Gate. Dating from the middle of the 19th century it is in French Renaissance style, built in brick with stone dressings and a slate roof. The lodge has three bays, the central lodge with two storeys, and the outer lodges with one storey and attics. The central bay is flanked by pilasters, and has a round-headed entrance with archivolts, a keystone, and decorated spandrels. The windows are round-headed sashes; there is a pair above the entrance, and one in each of the outer bays. In the attics are dormers with ball finials. The outer bays have hipped roofs, the central bay has a pyramidal roof, and all have spike finials. The simplest entrance is the northeast gate, dating from the 1770s, consisting of a pair of gate piers with later gates. The rusticated piers are in stone and have moulded caps and flattened ball finials.

== Appraisal ==
Ince Blundell Hall is described by Pollard and Pevsner as a "splendid Georgian house", although they consider Blundell's service block is "a rather plodding Palladian affair". The hall was designated a Grade II* listed building on 11 October 1968. Grade II* is the middle of the three grades of listing and is applied to "particularly important buildings of more than special interest". Also listed at this grade are the Pantheon, the Garden Temple, the Old Hall, and the Church of the Holy Family, along with the park and garden surrounding the hall. Other structures are listed at Grade II, the lowest grade, which is applied to "buildings of national importance and special interest". These are the stables, the column carrying an eagle, the sundial, the octagonal structure, the Lion Gate, the East Gate, the West Lodge, the Northeast Gate, and the base of the wayside cross.

== See also ==
- Grade II* listed buildings in Merseyside
- Listed buildings in Ince Blundell

== Notes and references ==
=== Sources ===
- Dillon, James (2009), The Hall in the Woods: Ince Blundell Hall, Augustinian Canonesses of Ince Blundell Hall, ISBN 978-0-9562109-0-6
- Pollard, Richard; Pevsner, Nikolaus (2006), Lancashire: Liverpool and the South-West, The Buildings of England, New Haven and London: Yale University Press, ISBN 0-300-10910-5
