= Henry Blundell (art collector) =

English art collector (1724–1810)

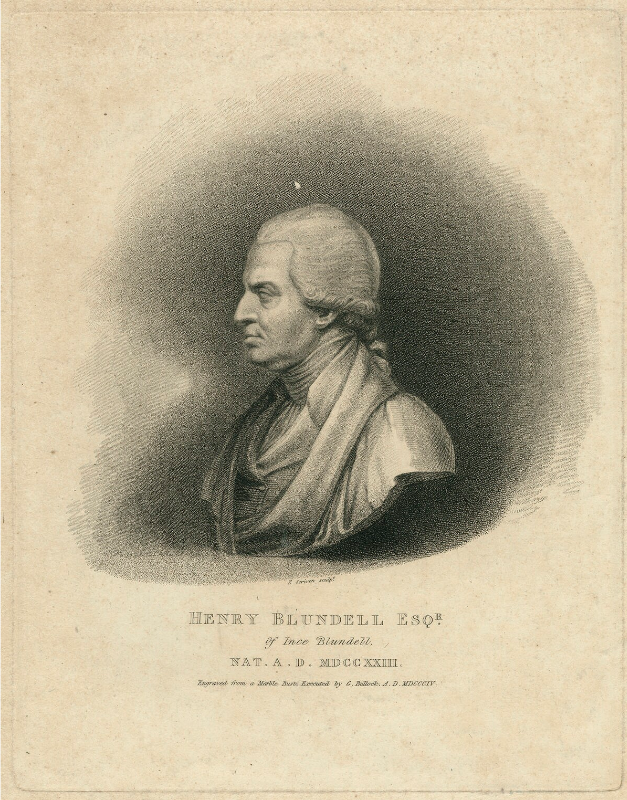
Stipple engraving of Henry Blundell by Edward Scriven (1804)

Henry Blundell (1724 – 28 August 1810) was an English art collector, who amassed a large collection of art and antiquities at Ince Blundell Hall in Lancashire.

== Life ==
Henry Blundell was born in Britain in 1724 at Ince Blundell, Lancashire. A Roman Catholic, like his friend and fellow collector Charles Townley (who would encourage Blundell's collecting and introduced him to the antiquary Thomas Jenkins), he was thus barred from the British university system, and he was educated in France at the college of the English Jesuits at St Omer and the English College, Douai.

In 1760, he married Elizabeth Mostyn, daughter of Sir George Mostyn, 4th Baronet Mostyn of Talacre, Flintshire, and Theresa Townley. Blundell commissioned his wife's portrait from Joshua Reynolds.

In 1761, Blundell had his family estates settled on him by his father. He also received a large inheritance from the death of a member of his mother's family without a male heir, further increased by income from his mother's estates and by his wife's death in 1767 and his father's death in 1773.

His high income from various sources enabled him to collect classical sculpture and old master paintings (including ones by or after Poussin, Ruisdael, Brueghel, Jacopo Bassano and Andrea del Sarto, and a copy of Veronese's The Wedding at Cana, commissioned during a visit to Paris), to improve Ince Blundell Hall and to buy and commission artworks from current artists like Richard Wilson, Canova, Gavin Hamilton and Anton Raphael Mengs.

In 1776 he went on a Grand Tour to Italy, visiting Milan, Venice, Ancona, Rome and Naples. There he made his first classical sculpture purchase through the antiquary Thomas Jenkins (a seated philosopher and eighty pieces from the Villa Mattei), but on later visits to Rome he came to mistrust Jenkins and relied more on Father John Thorpe. He tended to collect wholesale rather than discriminatingly, as with his group from the Villa Borrioni (probably also in 1777), and also knowingly purchased modern copies by Giuseppe Angelini and Carlo Albacini and others and classical works imaginatively restored by dealers such as Bartolomeo Cavaceppi and Giovanni Volpato. On this Grand Tour, Blundell commissioned a painting of Mount Vesuvius in eruption by French painter Pierre Jacques-Volaire, now housed in the North Carolina Museum of Art in Raleigh, North Carolina.

Making other trips to Rome in 1782–83, 1786, and 1790, his collecting patterns improved, in 1783 acquiring the high quality Minerva from Palazzo Lante, but the outbreak of the French Revolutionary Wars put a pause to his collecting and transferred his attention to creating new buildings at Ince Blundell for his collections (though he did buy at the 1800 and 1801 English sales of Lord Cawdor and Lord Bessborough's collections).

He also became the Liverpool Academy of Arts's first patron on its foundation in 1810, and was active in Liverpool public life (though unable to hold public office, as a Catholic). Many of his collected artworks can be seen around the galleries of Liverpool.

He died at Ince Blundell in 1810.
