= Gebhard Flatz =

Austrian painter (1800–1881)

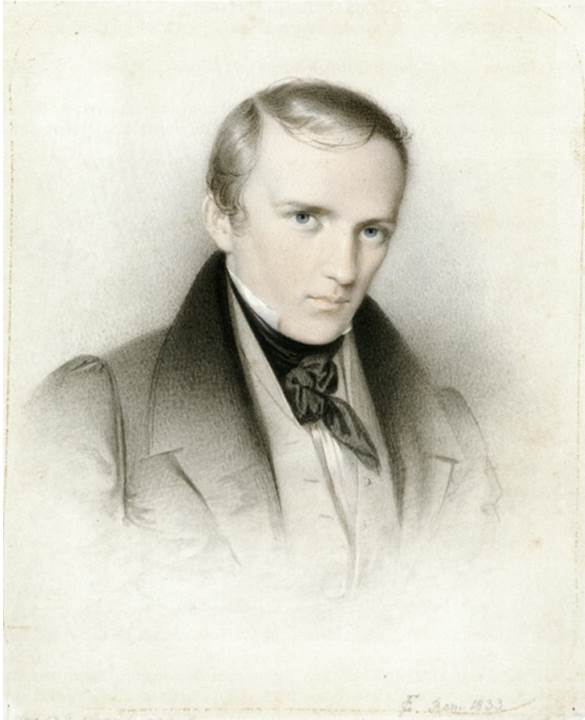
Gebhard Flatz. Watercolor by Eduard von Steinle (1833)

Johann Gebhard Flatz (11 June 1800 in Wolfurt – 19 May 1881 in Bregenz) was an Austrian painter of the Nazarene movement.

== Life and work ==
=== Education ===
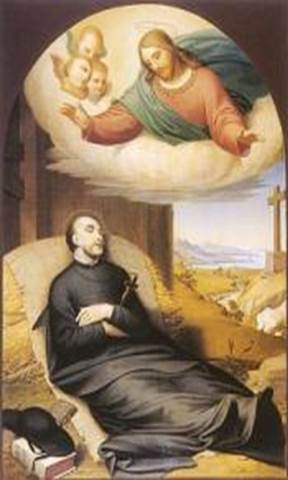
The Transfiguration of St. Francis (1866)

He was the eleventh child of a baker and, as might be expected, spent his childhood in poverty. Nevertheless, his talent was recognized at school and he was able to obtain a painting apprenticeship, which he completed at age fifteen. The following year, he travelled to Vienna to become a journeyman painter. During this time, he had to support himself as a waiter and house painter and was only able to attend art classes on Sundays. After four years of struggle, he was finally accepted by the Academy of Fine Arts but often had to go hungry to pay his fees. In 1827 he left Vienna, working in Bregenz and Innsbruck, where he produced and sold over 150 portraits in 1829.

=== Life in Rome and Innsbruck ===
He eventually saved enough money to take a trip to Rome, where he soon became involved with the Nazarene movement. When he became financially stable, he began moving between Rome and Innsbruck, occasionally taking students.

In 1838, he married Marie Felicitas Freiin von Foullon-Norbeck. Both of their children died shortly after birth. Marie also died a few weeks after the second delivery, in 1840. Flatz never completely recovered from this triple blow and began painting only hesitantly after a year had passed. He had an epitaph to his wife placed on the grounds of the Campo Santo Teutonico, of which he was a member.

Following the Capture of Rome in 1870, he moved to Vorarlberg. His last years were spent in a retirement home near the parish church of Bregenz, where he was honored as "the Catholic painter of his time" and was awarded the Order of Franz Joseph in 1879.
