= Merseyside Fire and Rescue Service =

Fire and rescue service in England

Operational area
- Country: England
- County: Merseyside

Agency overview
- Established: 1974
- Chief Fire Officer: Nick Searle

Website
- www.merseyfire.gov.uk

Merseyside Fire and Rescue Service (MFRS) is the statutory fire and rescue service covering the county of Merseyside in north-west England and is the statutory Fire and Rescue Authority responsible for all 999 fire brigade calls in Sefton, Knowsley, St. Helens, Liverpool and Wirral.

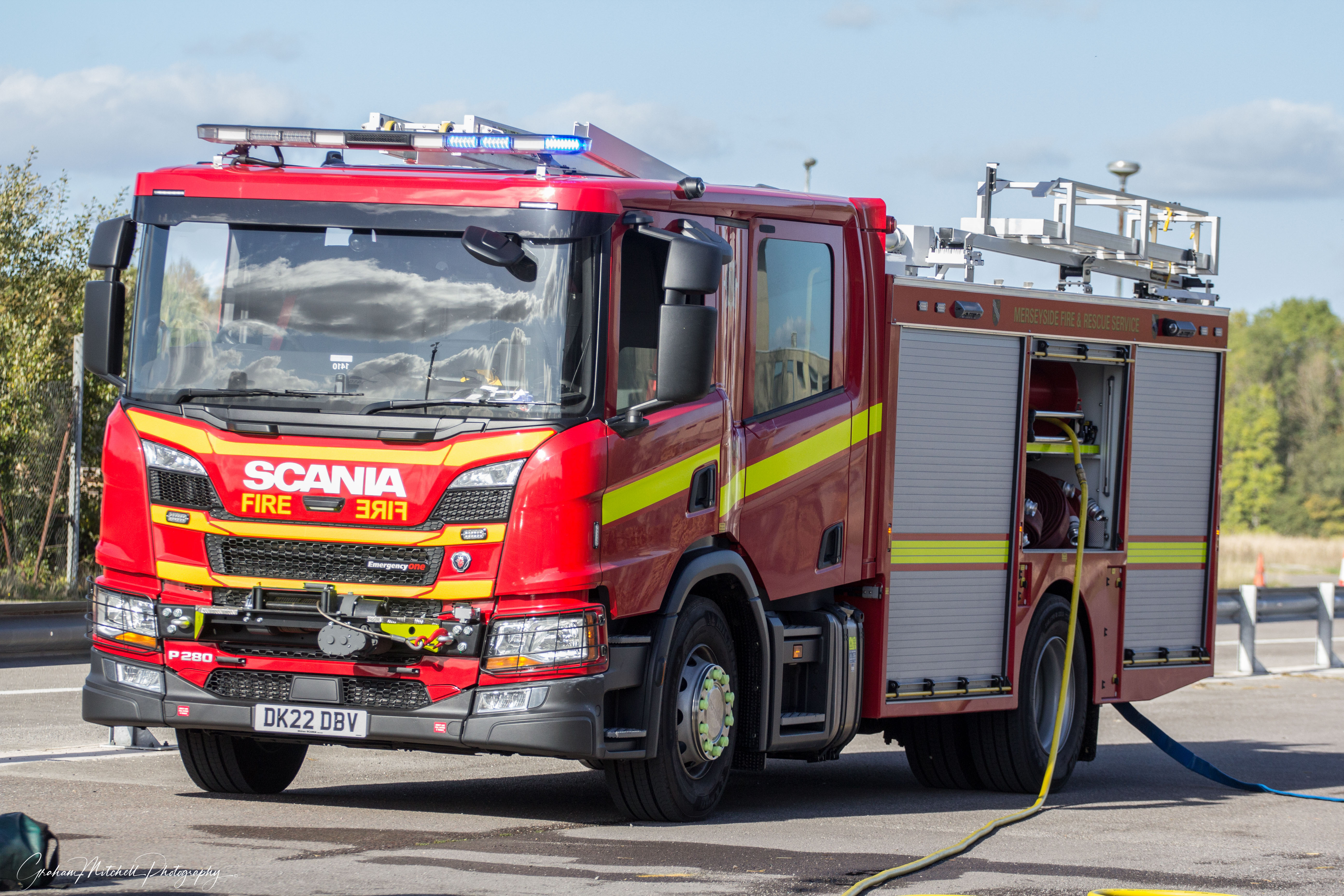
Rescue pumper at the Fire Service College, October 2022

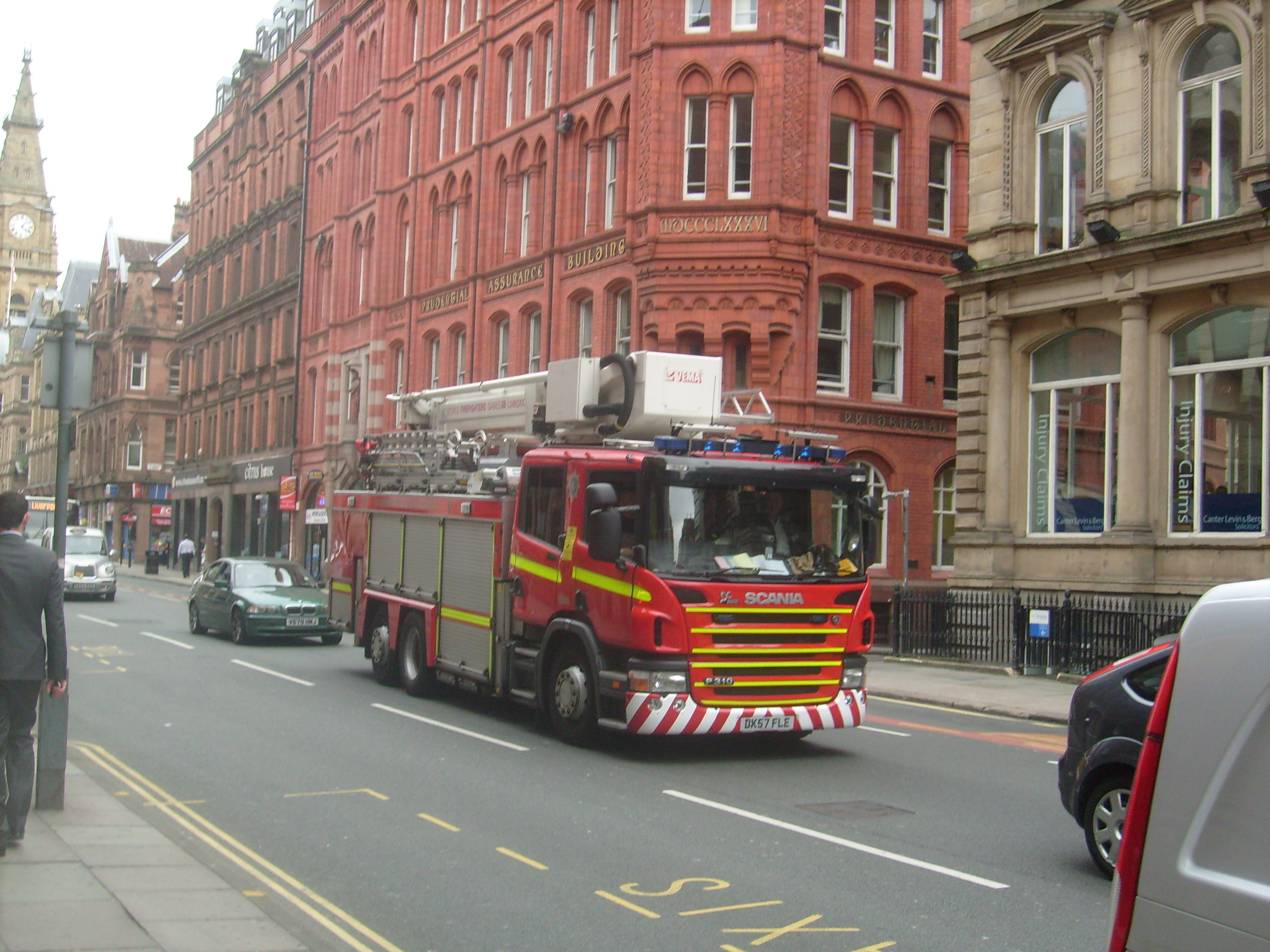
Aerial appliance on Dale Street in Liverpool, June 2010

== History ==
Liverpool Fire Police Act 1836
- Act of Parliament
- Parliament of the United Kingdom
- Long title: An Act for extending and improving the Maintenance of the Fire Police in the Borough of Liverpool.
- Citation: 6 & 7 Will. 4. c. xciii

Dates
- Royal assent: 4 July 1836
Other legislation
Repealed by	Liverpool Improvement Act 1842
Relates to	Liverpool Improvement Act 1826

Status: Repealed

Text of statute as originally enacted

In 1974, six borough fire brigades (City of Liverpool, Birkenhead, Bootle, Southport, St Helens, and Wallasey), as well as parts of Lancashire County Fire Brigade and Cheshire County Fire Brigade merged to create Merseyside Fire Brigade.

Merseyside Fire Brigade became Merseyside Fire and Civil Defence Authority on 1 April 1986, as established by the Local Government Act 1985.

In an effort to modernise fire services nationally, the Fire and Rescue Services Act 2004 received royal assent on 22 July 2004. This legislation changed the name to Merseyside Fire and Rescue Authority. The change of name also reflects the fact that the service, in addition to fighting fire, conducts rescues such as road traffic collisions and is heavily involved in prevention work in communities.

Merseyside Fire and Rescue Authority headquarters is located on Bridle Road, Bootle

Since 2013, the MACC relocated from Derby Road, Kirkdale to a purpose built joint control centre with Merseyside Police, which is also located at the Bridle Road site.

Merseyside Fire and Rescue Authority is made up of five area commands as follows: Liverpool, Wirral, Sefton, Knowsley, and St Helens. Within these areas are:

- 13 wholetime fire stations
- Four (LLAR) low level activity and risk (day cover 10:00–22:00, stand down 22:00–10:00)
- One wholetime marine rescue station
- Two wholetime / day-crewed station (30 minutes resilience)
- One resilience station (30 minutes resilience)

Which provides Merseyside with 24-hour fire cover.

== Performance ==
Every fire and rescue service in England and Wales is periodically subjected to a statutory inspection by His Majesty's Inspectorate of Constabulary and Fire & Rescue Services (HMICFRS). The inspections investigate how well the service performs in each of three areas. On a scale of outstanding, good, requires improvement and inadequate, Merseyside Fire and Rescue Service was rated as follows:

HMICFRS Inspection Merseyside
Area	Rating 2018/19	Rating 2021/22	Description
Effectiveness	Good	Good	How effective is the fire and rescue service at keeping people safe and secure from fire and other risks?
Efficiency	Good	Outstanding	How efficient is the fire and rescue service at keeping people safe and secure from fire and other risks?
People	Good	Good	How well does the fire and rescue service look after its people?

== See also ==
- Fire services in the United Kingdom
- List of British firefighters killed in the line of duty
- Liverpool Salvage Corps
- Motorcycles in the United Kingdom fire services
