= Fontana dell'Acqua Felice =

Roman monumental fountain

- Fountain
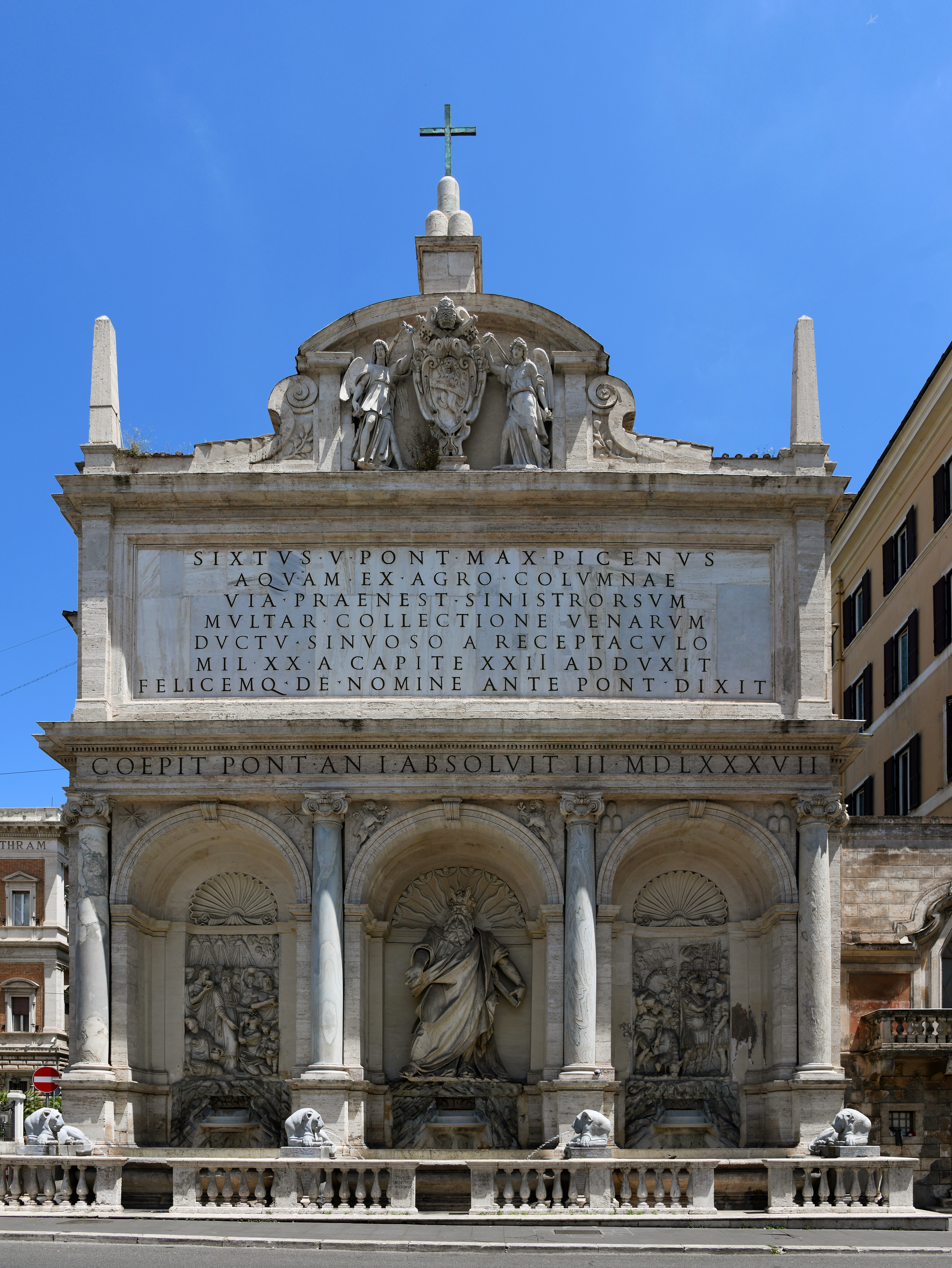
- Fontana dell'Acqua Felice
- Design: Domenico Fontana
- Location: Rome, Italy
- Interactive map of Fontana dell'Acqua Felice
- Coordinates: 41°54′16″N 12°29′40″E

The Fontana dell'Acqua Felice, also called the Fountain of Moses, is a monumental fountain located in the Quirinale District of Rome, Italy. It marked the terminus of the Acqua Felice aqueduct restored by Pope Sixtus V. It was designed by Domenico Fontana and built in 1585–1588. It is located at the intersection of Largo Santa Susanna and Via Venti Settembre; across and diagonal from the Largo, is the church of Santa Susanna, while across Via Venti Settembre is the church of Santa Maria della Vittoria.

== History ==
At the beginning the reign of Pope Sixtus V (born Felice Peretti) in 1585, only one of the ancient Roman aqueducts which brought water to the city, the Aqua Vergine, was still being maintained and working. Everyone in Rome who wanted clean drinking water had to go to the single fountain near the site of today's Trevi Fountain. Pope Sixtus took on the responsibility of restoring other aqueducts, including the Acqua Alessandrina, which he renamed Acqua Felice after himself. The new fountain that marked the terminus of the restored aqueduct was the first new monumental wall fountain in Rome since antiquity.

The initial effort to build the aqueduct, by architect Matteo Bartolini, was a failure: Bartolini miscalculated the incline of the channel, so the flow of water was much less than needed reach the Quirinal Hill, the intended site of its terminal fountain. Giovanni Fontana took over the building of the aqueduct, which was completed by June 1587. A fountain was constructed by architect engineer Domenico Fontana in the form of an ancient Roman triumphal arch. It featured, as ancient Roman fountains did, an inscription honoring its builder, Pope Sixtus, beneath angels holding the papal coat of arms.

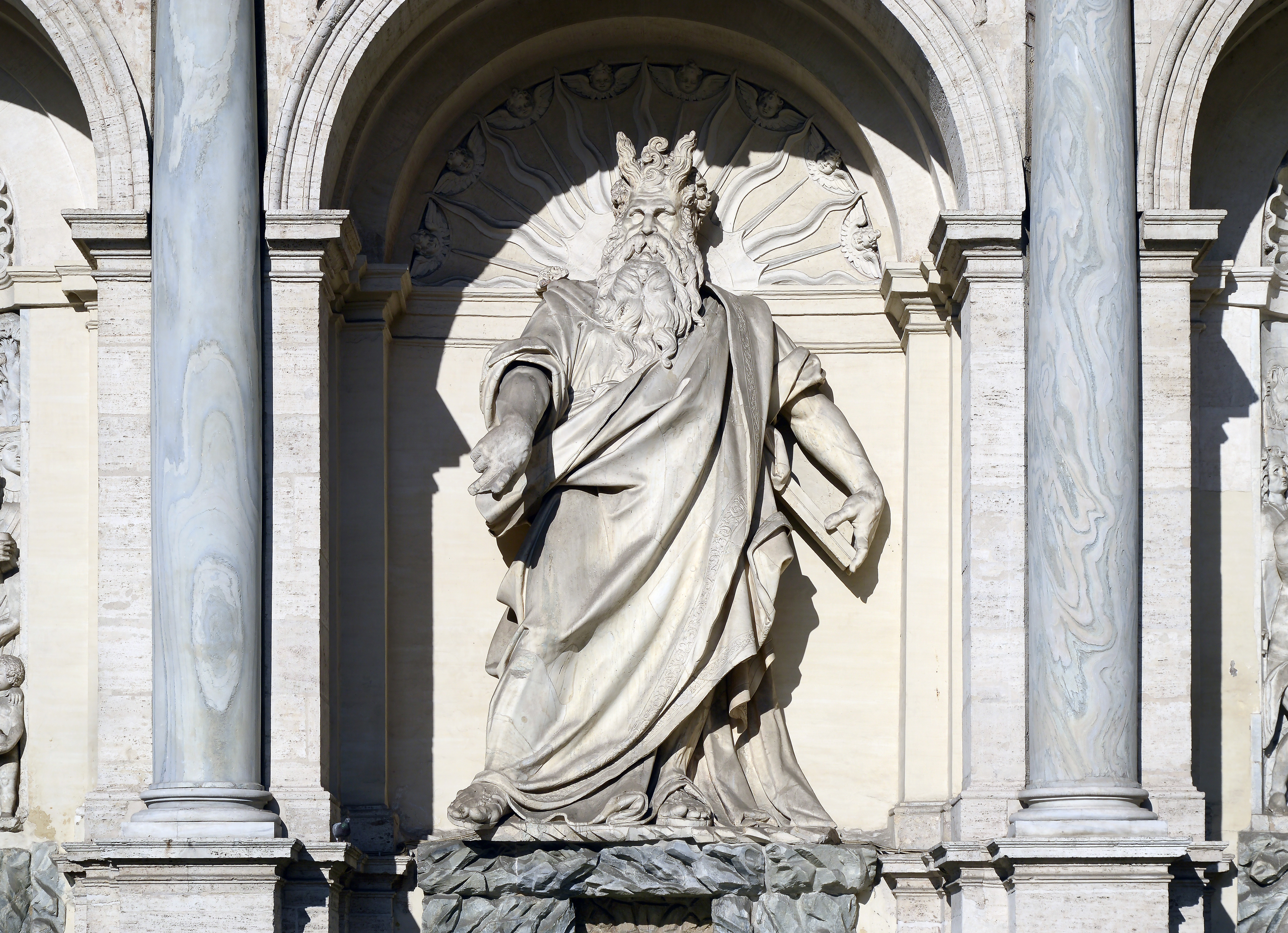
Fontana dell'Acqua Felice, statue of Moses

The iconography of the sculptures beneath the arches mingles a biblical and political motifs. The central arch featured a large statue of Moses, made in 1588 by Leonardo Sormani and Prospero da Brescia. The pope, as both religious and political ruler of the papal states, would have felt an affinity to Moses. The left bas-relief panel, sometimes referred to as a depiction of Aaron, and sculpted by Giovanni Battista della Porta, may instead reflect either the miracles by Moses at Marah, where Moses removed the bitterness of the barely potable water of a spring in Sinai, or more likely the miracle at Masah and Meribah, where he struck the rock to cause water to flow (Exodus 17:5-7). Again, the pope would have wanted his achievement of bringing water to Rome to be compared to that of Moses. Finally, the bas-relief to the right sculpted by Flaminio Vacca and Pietro Paolo Olivieri, has been depicted as Joshua, but others claim the relief references Gideon in Judges 7:5, as evidenced by soldier's gear and animals lapping water. Alternatively, given the Roman attire of the soldiers, it may reflect the founding of the ancient Roman Acqua Alessandrina by emperor Septimius Severus; the imagery would lead to having the feat of the aqueduct being compared to the achievements of ancient Rome, or as an example of the restoration of the former glory of the city. Water flows from the statues into basins, where four lions, originally Ancient Egyptian sculptures, but now copies, once were part of a monumental fountain dedicated to Marcus Agrippa in front of the Roman Pantheon, are spouting water. The columns flanking the arches are also said to have derived from that structure.

The statue of Moses was criticized at the time for its large size, not in proportion with the other statuary, but the fountain achieved its political purpose; it was a statement of how the Catholic Church, unlike the Protestant Reformation, was serving the needs of the people of Rome. It also achieved its social purpose of reviving the Quirinal neighborhood; what had been a rustic area of villas was turned into a thriving urban neighborhood by the arrival of a good drinking water supply.

== See also ==
- List of fountains in Rome

== Bibliography ==
- Venuti, Ridolfino (1766). Accurata, E Succinta Descrizione Topografica, E Istorica Di Roma. Vol. 1. Rome: Carlo Barbellieni.
- Marilyn Symmes, ed. (1998). Fountains, Splash and Spectacle - Water and Design from the Renaissance to the Present. Vol. 1. Thames and Hudson, in association with the Cooper-Hewitt National Design Museum and Smithsonian Institution.

Preceded by Fontana delle Api	Landmarks of Rome; Fontana dell'Acqua Felice	Succeeded by Fontana dell'Acqua Paola
