= Acqua Felice =

16th century Roman aqueduct

Coordinates: 41°54′15.7″N 12°29′39.9″E

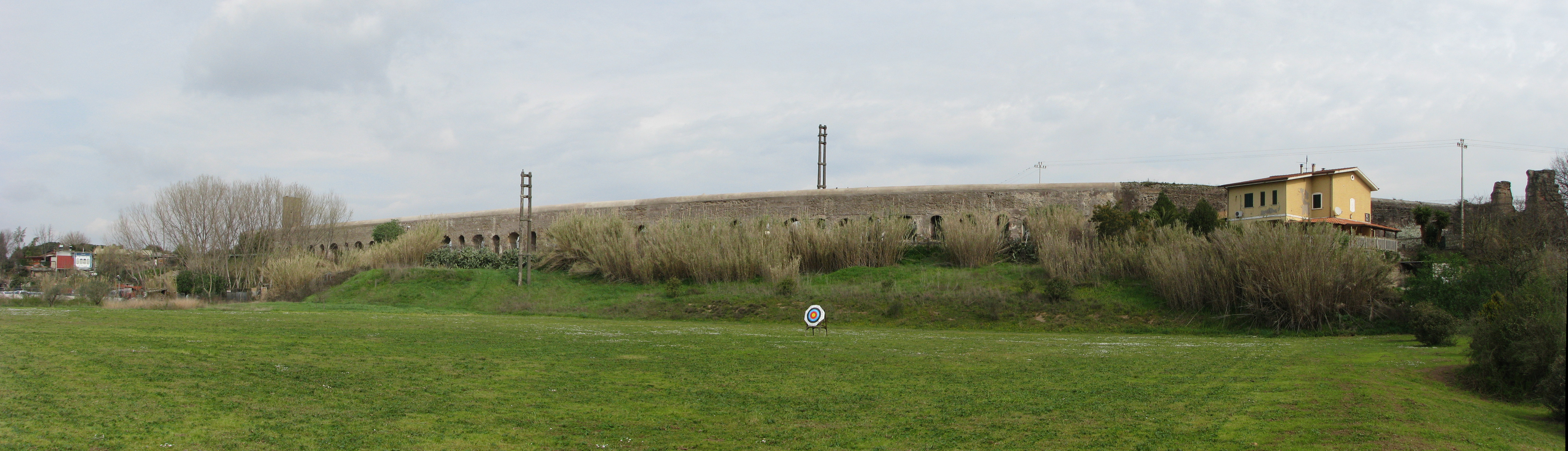
Acqua Felice south of Torre del fiscale

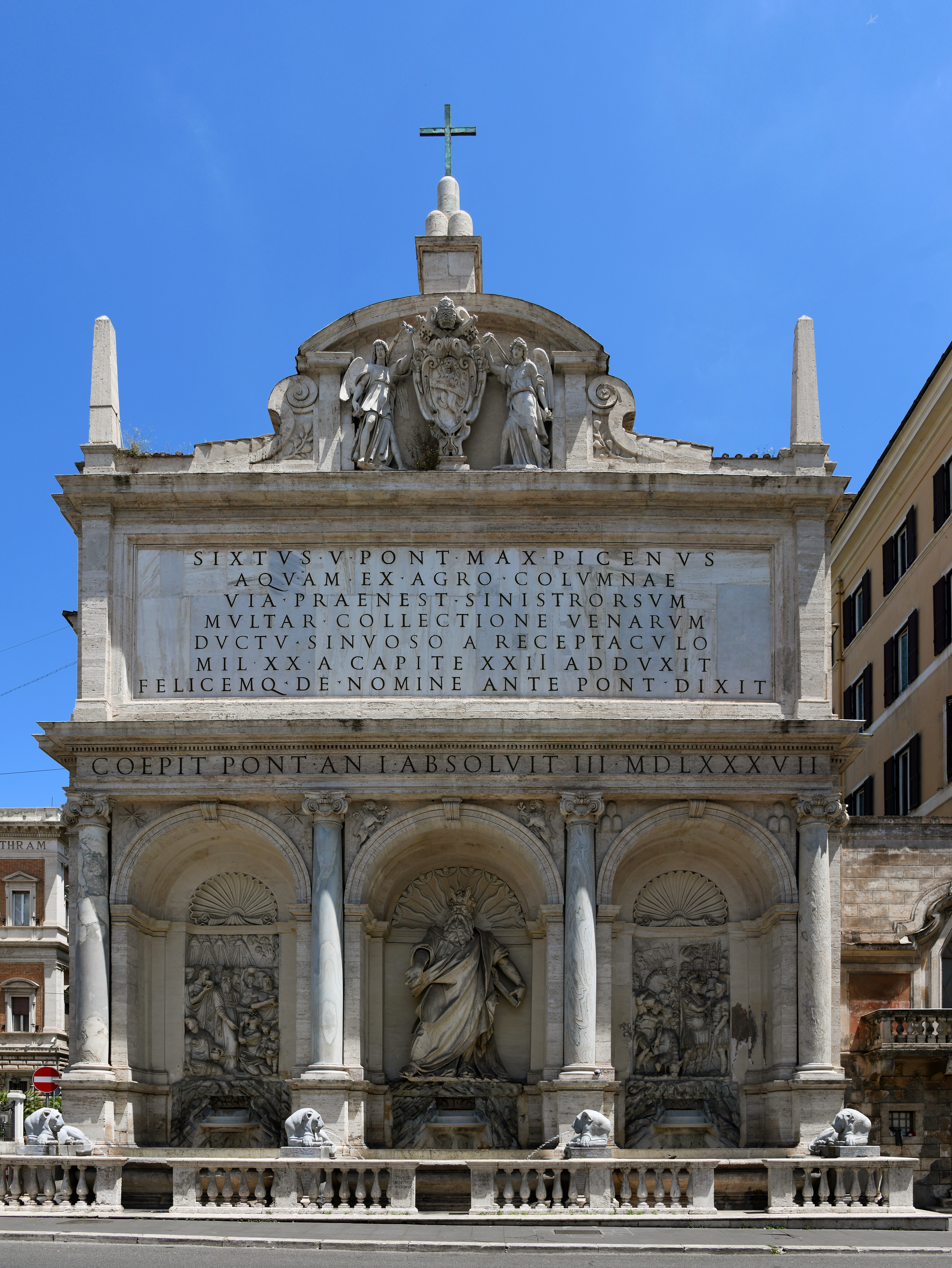
The Fountain of Moses marks the terminus of the acqua Felice on the Quirinal

The Acqua Felice is one of the aqueducts of Rome, completed in 1586 by Pope Sixtus V, whose birth name, which he never fully abandoned, was Felice Peretti. The first new aqueduct of early modern Rome, its source is at the springs at Pantano Borghese, off Via Casilina. Its length is fifteen miles (24 km), running underground for eight miles (13 km) from its source, first in the channel of Aqua Alexandrina, then alternating on the arches of the Aqua Claudia and the Aqua Marcia for seven miles (11 km) to its terminus at the Fontana dell'Acqua Felice on the Quirinal Hill, standing to one side of the Strada Pia (now Via del Quirinale), so as to form a piazza in this still new part of Rome. The engineer was Giovanni Fontana, brother of Sixtus' engineer-architect Domenico Fontana, who recorded that the very day the new pope entered the Lateran, he decided that he would bring water once again to the hills of Rome, which had remained waterless and sparsely inhabited, largely by monasteries, since the original ancient aqueducts had been destroyed in the sixth century. From the source, which Sixtus purchased, there was only a very small fall, and the work required an underground conduit as well as an aqueduct carried on arches.

== Construction ==
The work was completed within eighteen months, at the same time that Sixtus was engaged in laying out the street plan that would provide the arteries of modern Rome. By October 1586, water was running at his Villa Montalto, and by 1589 it was filling no less than twenty-seven public fountains.

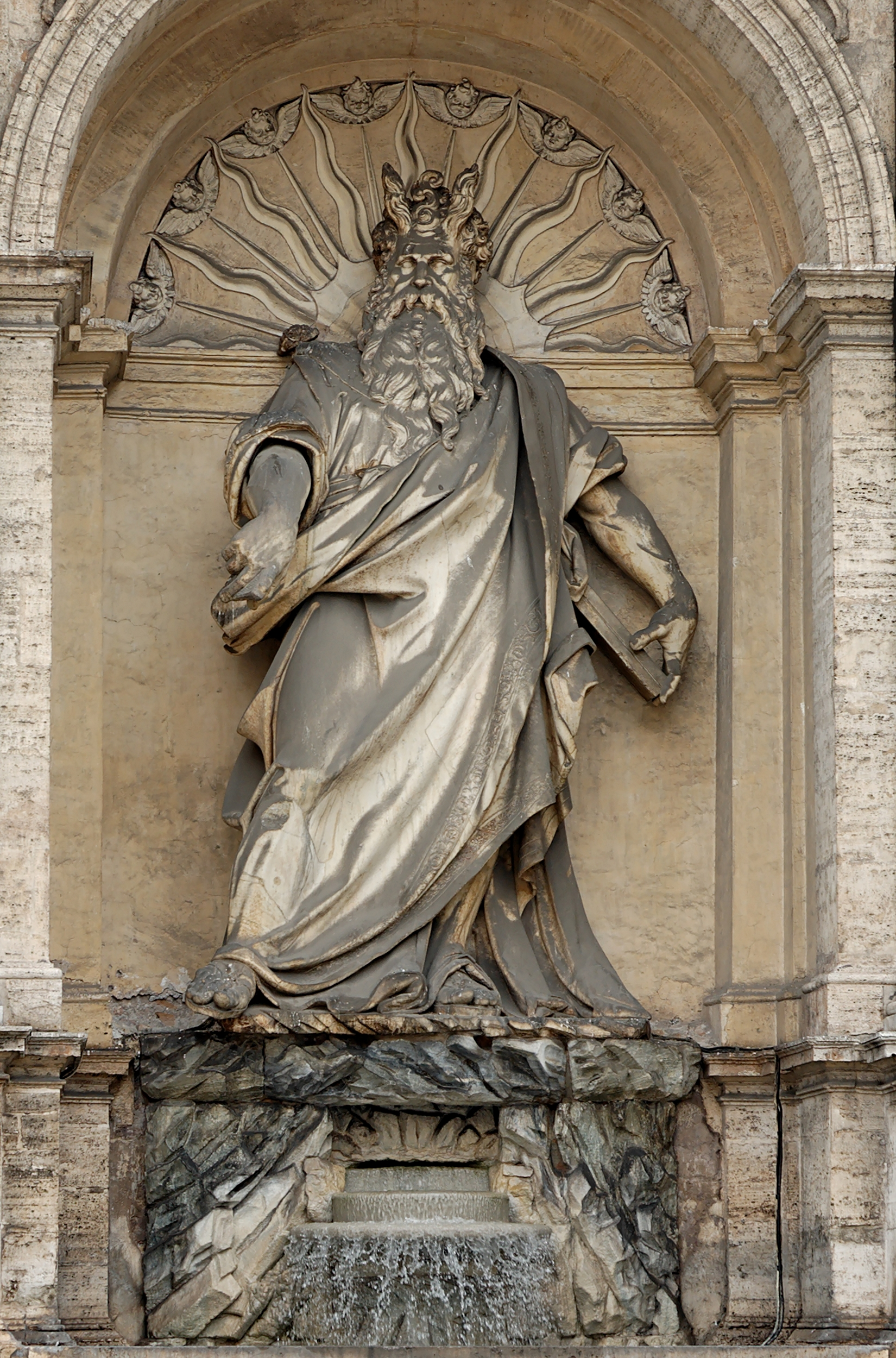
Moses, by Leonardo Sormani and Prospero Antichi added little to their contemporary reputations

== Cultural significance ==
The three-arched Fontana dell'Acqua Felice (designed by Domenico Fontana, 1587) marked the entry of the new water source into Rome, with the conventional mostra or showy terminus: "what makes a fountain a mostra is not essentially its size or splendor, but its specific designation as the fountain that is a public memorial to the whole achievement of the aqueduct." "Even in the seventeenth century this fountain was considered as being in very bad style (pessimo stile)," Siegfried Giedion reported "and it is scarcely conceivable that such mediocrity was possible only two decades after the death of Michelangelo". Its disproportionately large attic, a billboard for the triumphant inscription, has an unbalanced stagey flatness; its proportions may be unfavorably compared to the Arco Scalette, Vicenza, erected in 1576, probably designed by Andrea Palladio (illustration, right).

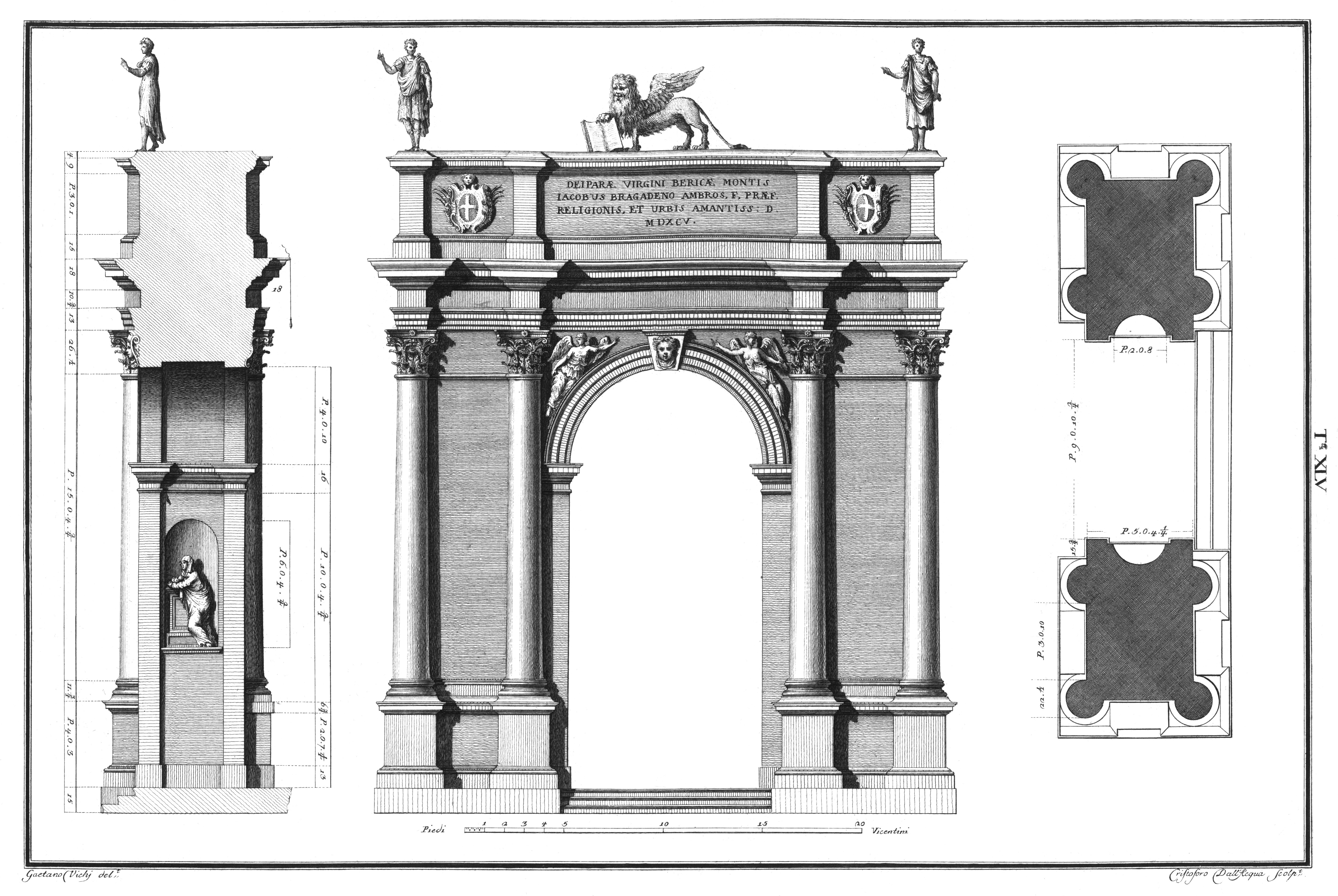
Arco Salette, Vicenza, 1576, attributed to Andrea Palladio, for comparison

The allegories are resolutely biblical, avoiding classical pagan allusions in publicising the modern pope who demolished the Septizodium to make way for his avenues linking the major Christian monuments of Rome, the pilgrimage basilicas. Any mostra had its practical aspect in providing public water supply for its rione (the city's administrative areas). The marble basins, flanked by Egyptian lions that spit water, served as reservoirs for local inhabitants; marble barriers keep animals from polluting the water: for them there is a special basin nearby. Next to the fountain Sixtus installed two long basins for washing laundry, and a covered washhouse where women might enjoy privacy.
