= Arch of Pope Sixtus V =

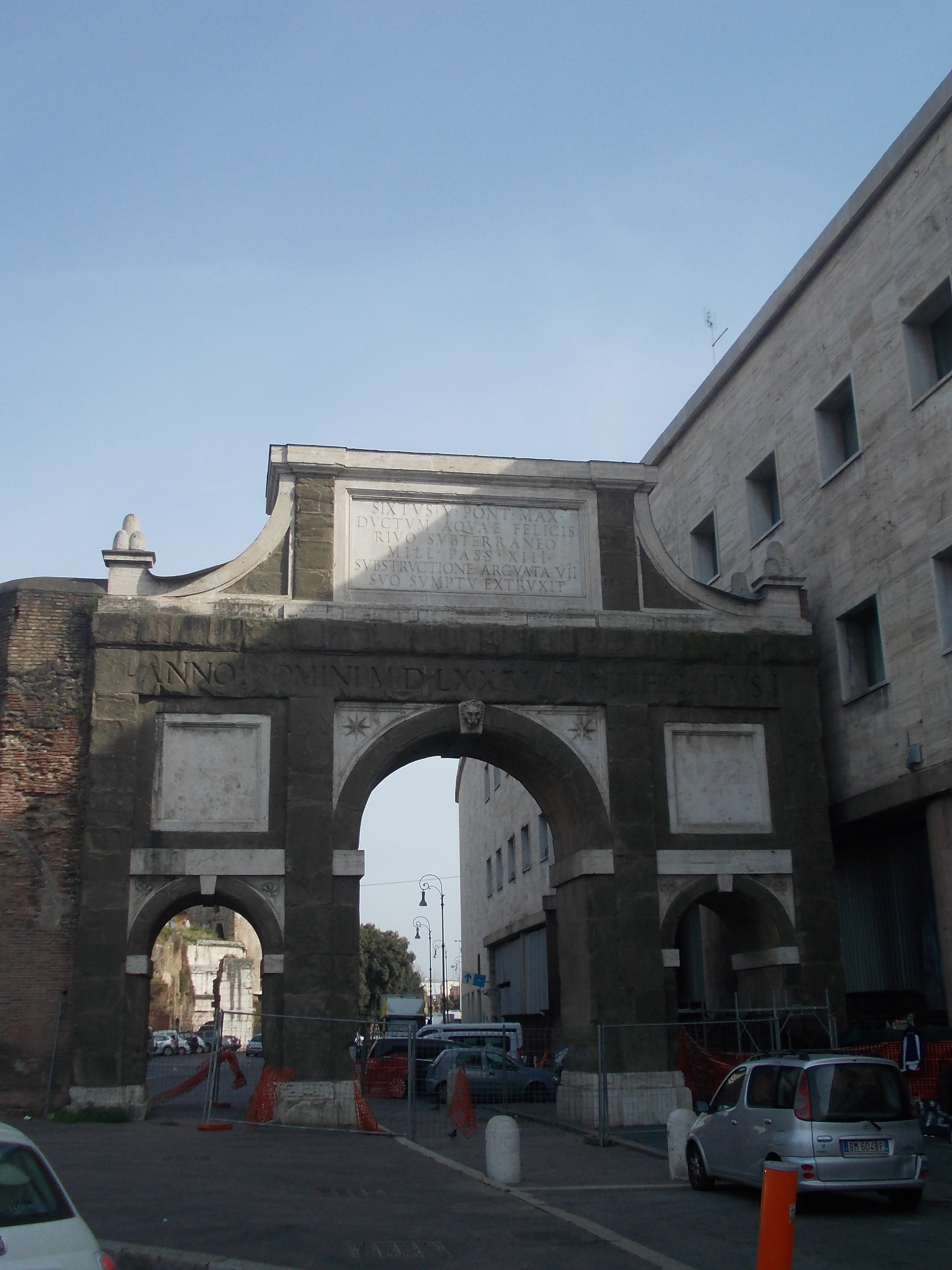
The arch with the facade facing Piazzale Sisto V.

The Arch of Sextus V or Felice Arch is a 1585 commemorative monument in the Esquilino rione of Rome. It is positioned at the intersection of the two streets which formerly led directly to the basilicas of Santa Maria Maggiore and Santa Maria degli Angeli e dei Martiri, very close to the porta San Lorenzo.

It celebrates the completion of the Acqua Felice, begun by pope Gregory XIII to serve the multitude of pilgrims coming to Rome for the 1575 jubilee and completed by pope Sextus V (born Felice Piergentile) during the first year of his pontificate. It is also popularly known as the arco delle pere (literally arch of the pears), after the pears in Sixtus' papal insignia, which are reproduced in travertine on the sides of the two small side arches. Other symbols of Sixtus are prominent on both facades - two stars on the sides of the main arch facing south-east, two stylised mountains on the sides of the main arch facing north-west and a lion's head on each of the two keystones on either side of the main arch.

It was designed by Giovanni Fontana, who closely based it on the model of ancient Roman triumphal arches, with a large central arch flanked by two smaller ones. It is built of peperino, used for several monuments in Rome of that era, enriched with travertine. It was inserted organically into the aqueduct itself, whose final section overlapped the Aurelian Wall, but now seems as if it is leaning on the back of the Termini station, for which part of the aqueduct was demolished in the 19th century.

== Inscriptions ==
=== Facing via di Porta San Lorenzo ===
SIXTVS · V · PONT · MAX ·
VIAS VTRASQ· ET AD S· MARIAM
MAIOREM ET AD S · MARIAM
ANGELORUM AD POPVLI
COMMODITATEM ET DEVOTIONEM
LONGAS LATASQ
SVA IMPENSA STRAVIT (Note: Sixtus V, Chief Priest, for the convenience and devotion of the people, at his own expense expanded in both length and width the streets towards both Santa Maria Maggiore and Santa Maria degli Angeli)

=== Facing Piazzale Sisto V ===
SIXTVS V PONT MAX DVCTVM AQVAE FELICIS
RIVO SVBTERRANEO
MILL · PASS · (Note: An abbreviation for 'milia passum', Latin for a thousand paces, i.e. an ancient Roman mile, equivalent to 1.482 km.) XIII ·
SVBSTRVCTIONE ARCVATA VII
SVO SVMPTV EXTRVXIT (Note: Sixtus V, Chief Priest, completed at his own expense the underground pipeline of the Acqua Felice for 30 miles, on arched substructures for 7 miles)

=== South-east and north-west ===
On the south-east side is an inscription reading "ANNO DOMINI MDLXXXV PONTIFICATUS I", which gives the completion date. A similar or identical one was on the north-west side but is now illegible except for the letters "ANN".

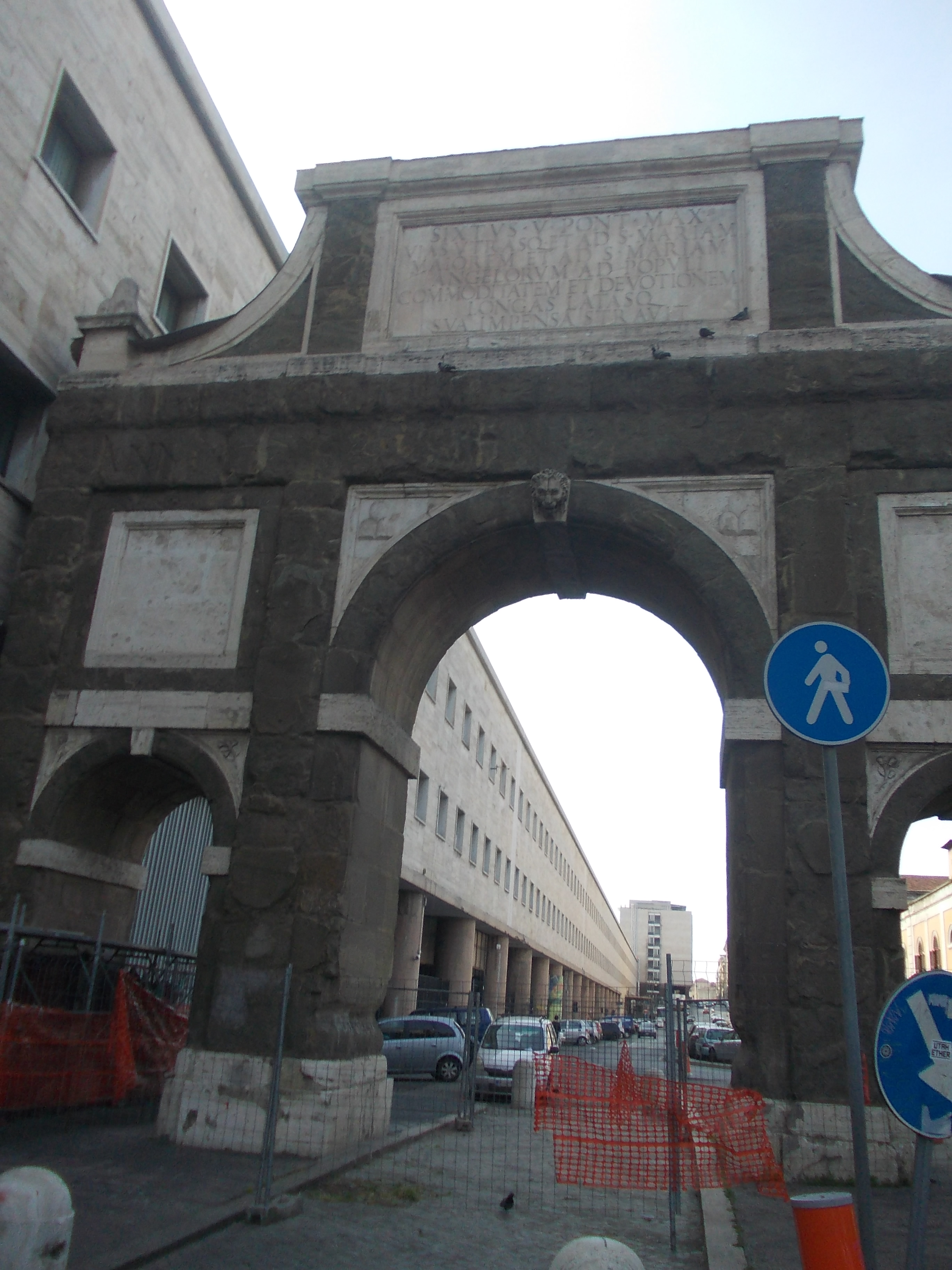
Facade facing via di Porta San Lorenzo

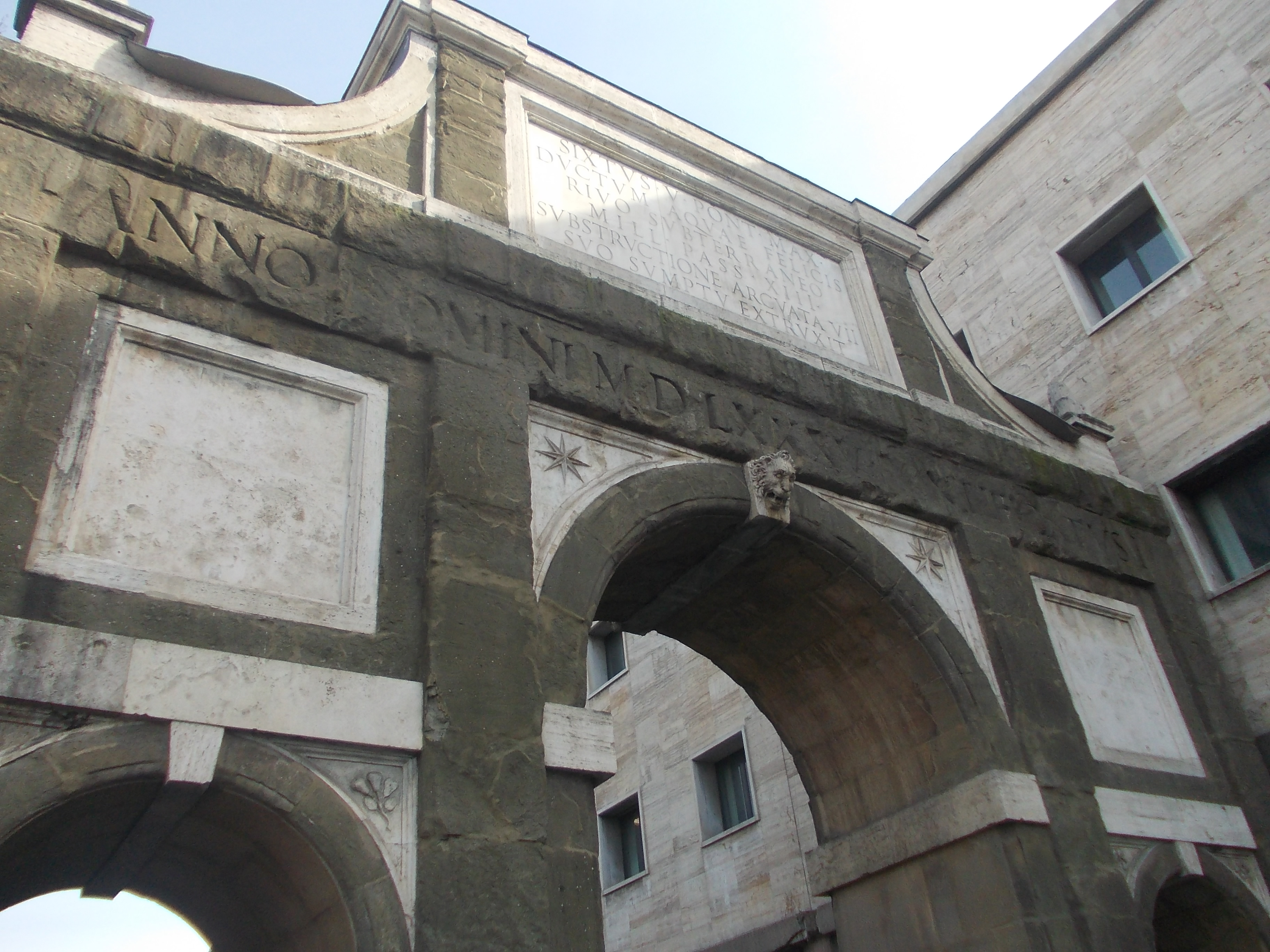
Upper section facing piazzale Sisto V

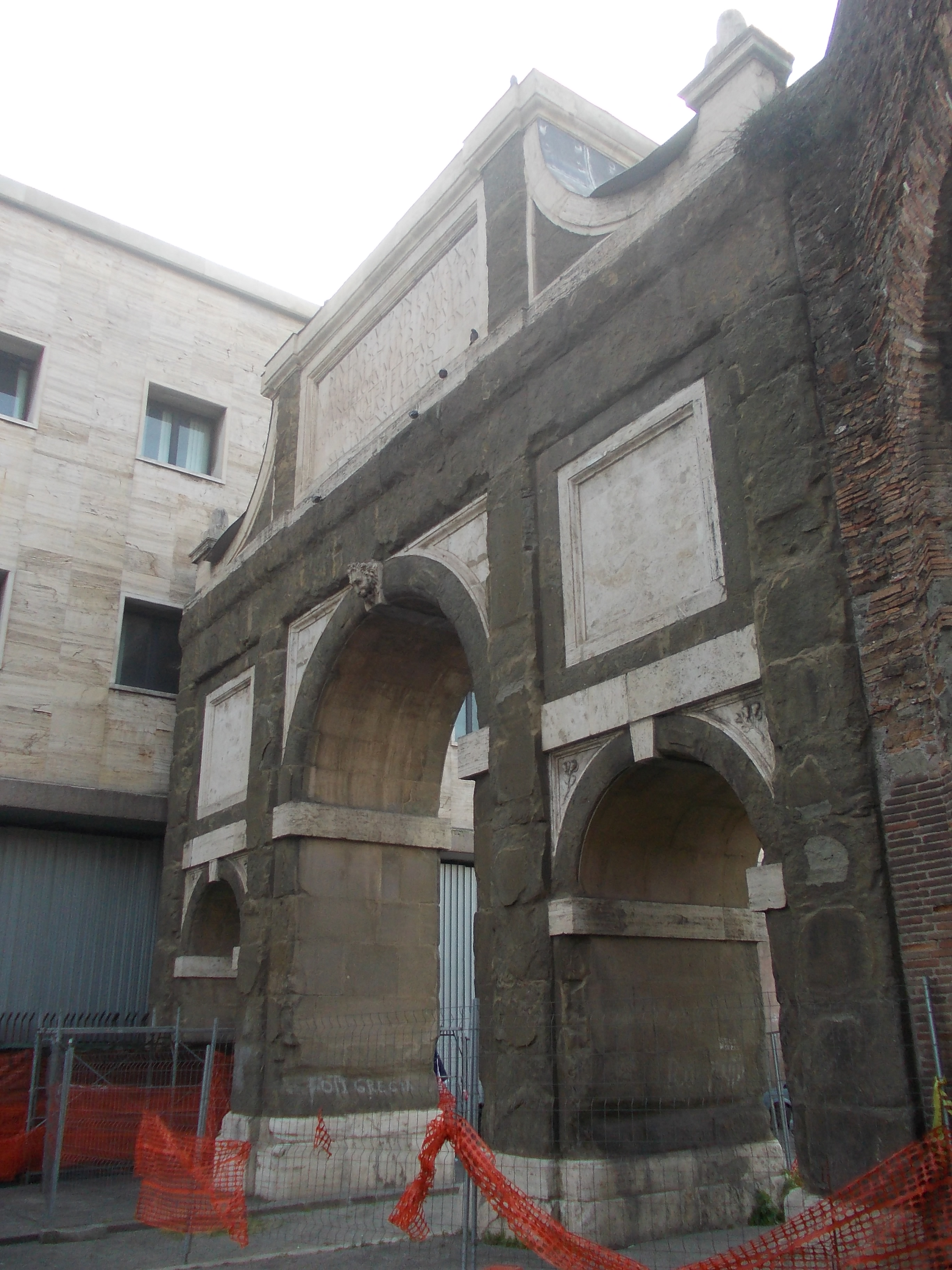
Arch facing via di Porta S.Lorenzo
