= Aldobrandini family =

Italian noble family

- Country: Italy; Former countries: Republic of Florence; Grand Duchy of Tuscany; Papal States; Kingdom of Italy
- Founded: 14th century
- Titles: Pope (non-hereditary); Cardinal (non-hereditary); Prince of Meldola; Prince of Sarsina; Prince of Rossano; Duke of Sarsina

The House of Aldobrandini is an Italian noble family originally from Florence, where in the Middle Ages they held the most important municipal offices. Now the Aldobrandini are resident in Rome, with close ties to the Vatican.

== History ==
Their Roman fortunes were made when Ippolito Aldobrandini became pope under the name Pope Clement VIII. He arranged the marriage that linked the Aldobrandini with the Roman family of Pamphili. They were also linked to marriage alliances with the Farnese (Ranuccio I, duke of Parma, had married Margherita Aldobrandini) and Borghese (since Olimpia Aldobrandini married Paolo Borghese).

The family also lends its name to the Palazzo Aldobrandini on the Quirinal Hill. The Aldobrandini family, having reached the height of its powers when Ippolito Aldobrandini became Pope Clement VIII (1592–1605), began the building of the villa. In 1600, Pope Clement VIII acquired the Orti Vitelli on the Quirinal hill, and in 1601, donated the property to his Cardinal-nephew Pietro Aldobrandini. The old buildings of the Vitelli Family were demolished and construction began on the new villa and adjacent garden. The villa was never the family seat as the Aldobrandini family owned even more splendid residences elsewhere in Rome. The villa on the Quirinal hill served essentially for ceremonial functions.

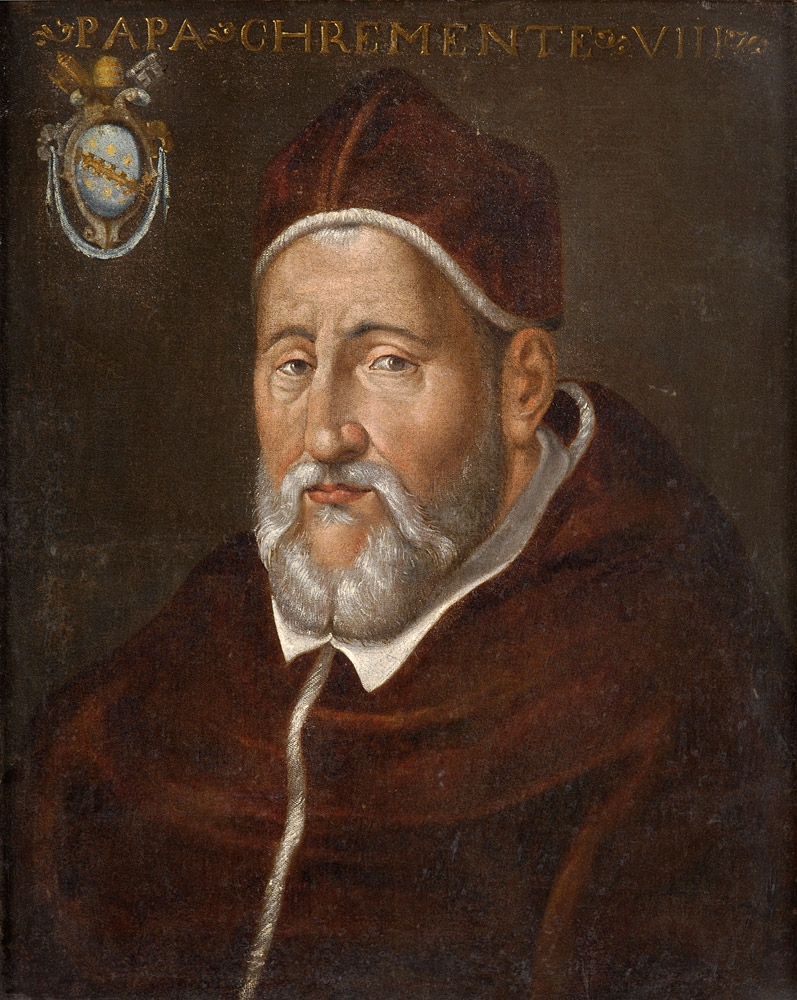
Ippolito Aldobrandini, Pope Clement VIII

More famous was the Villa Aldobrandini in Frascati. Also known as Belvedere for its charming location overlooking the whole valley up to Rome, it was rebuilt on the order of Cardinal Pietro Aldobrandini over a pre-existing edifice built by the Vatican prelate Alessandro Rufini in 1550. The villa, aligned with the cathedral down its axial avenue that is continued through the town as Viale Catone, was rebuilt in the current form by Giacomo della Porta from 1598 to 1602, and then completed by Carlo Maderno and Giovanni Fontana. The villa has an imposing 17th-century façade and some other interesting architectural and environmental features, such as the double gallery order on the rear façade, the spiral-shaped flights, the large exedra of the Water Theatre and the magnificent park. Inside there are paintings of Mannerist and Baroque artists such as the Zuccari brothers, Cavalier D'Arpino and Domenichino. Outside there is a monumental gate by Carlo Francesco Bizzaccheri (early 18th century).

The Doria, Pamphilj, Landi and Aldobrandini families have become united through marriage and descent under the simplified surname Doria Pamphilj (which is now extinct since the death of Princess Orietta Doria Pamphlij in 2000). The Aldobrandini family palazzo and its collections of works of art and furnishings is now the Doria Pamphilj Gallery in Rome.

The family name lives on, however, via a branch of the Borghese family, descended from the marriage of Olimpia Aldobrandini with Prince Paolo Borghese in the 17th century. This line is descended from Don Camillo Borghese, Prince Aldobrandini (1816–1902), a leading member of the soi-disant Black Nobility, who in turn was the younger brother of the then Prince Borghese and head of that family. Princess Olimpia Anna Aldobrandini, also a non-lineal descendant of Napoleon on her mother's side, married into the Rothschild family.

The Head of the family today is Prince Camillo Aldobrandini (b. 1945), whose heir is Don Clemente Aldobrandini (b. 1982).

== Other notable members of the Aldobrandini family ==
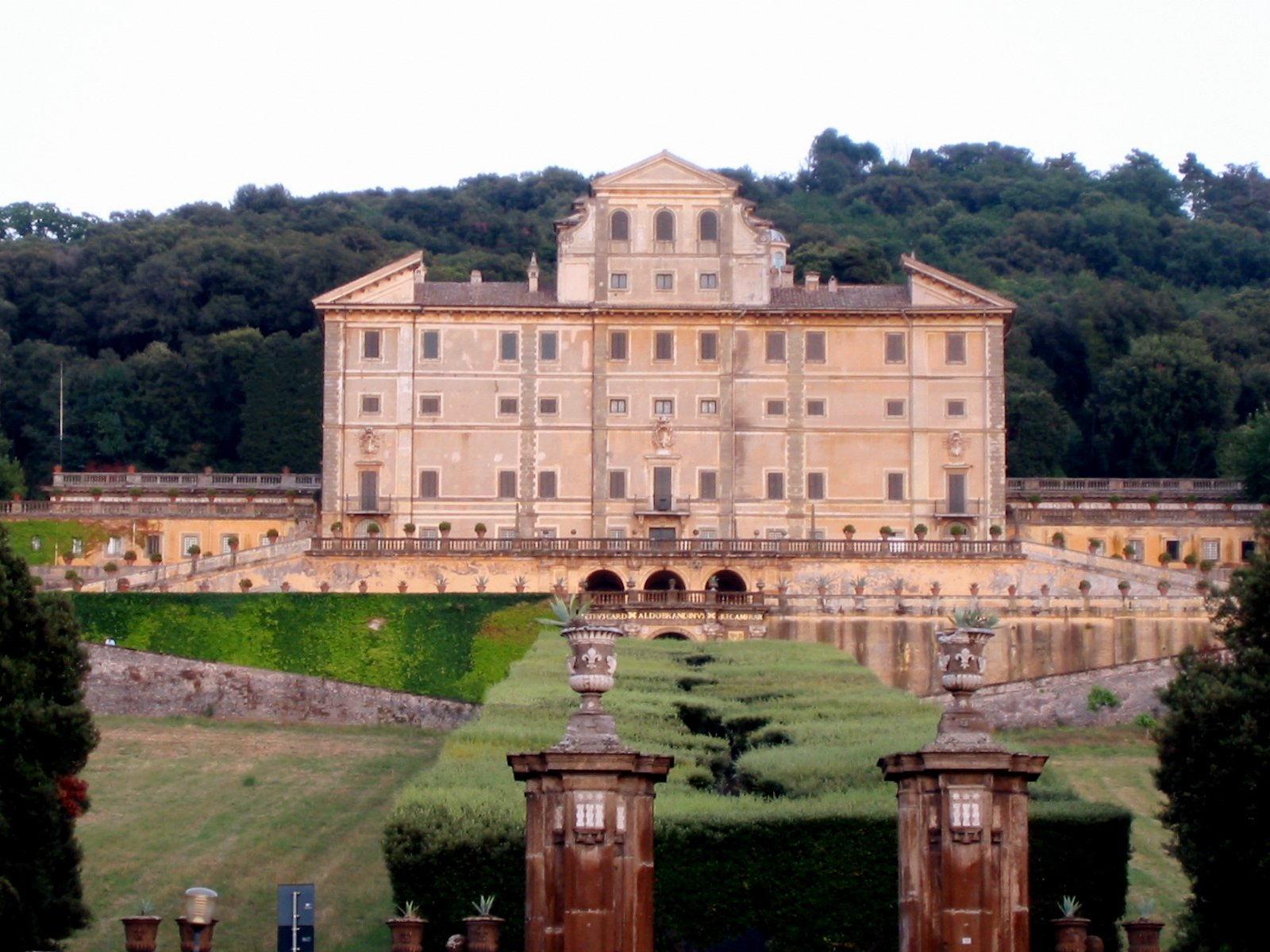
The Villa Aldobrandini in Frascati.

- Alessandro Cardinal Aldobrandini (1667–1734), raised to the cardinalate 1730.
- Bonifazio Bevilacqua Aldobrandini
- Ippolito Cardinal Aldobrandini (Jr.)
- Silvestro Cardinal Aldobrandini
- Cinzio Passeri Cardinal Aldobrandini, a Cardinal-nephew of Clement VIII, raised to the cardinalate 1593.
- Pietro Cardinal Aldobrandini (1571–1621), raised to the cardinalate 1593 by Pope Clement VIII.

== Sources ==
- Original 1922 Almanach de Gotha (edited by Justice Perthes) entry for the Borghese family (of which the Aldobrandini are a branch – see bottom of p288), link to the original universally-recognised genealogical reference document, with details of family honours

== See also ==
- Palazzo Chigi
- Palazzo Borghese-Aldobrandini
- Aldobrandini Collection
- Villa Aldobrandini
- Aldobrandini Madonna (disambiguation)
- The Aldobrandini Wedding, a celebrated Ancient Roman fresco
