= Aqua Traiana =

1st-century Roman aqueduct from Lake Bracciano to Rome

Coordinates: 41.8886°N 12.4641°E

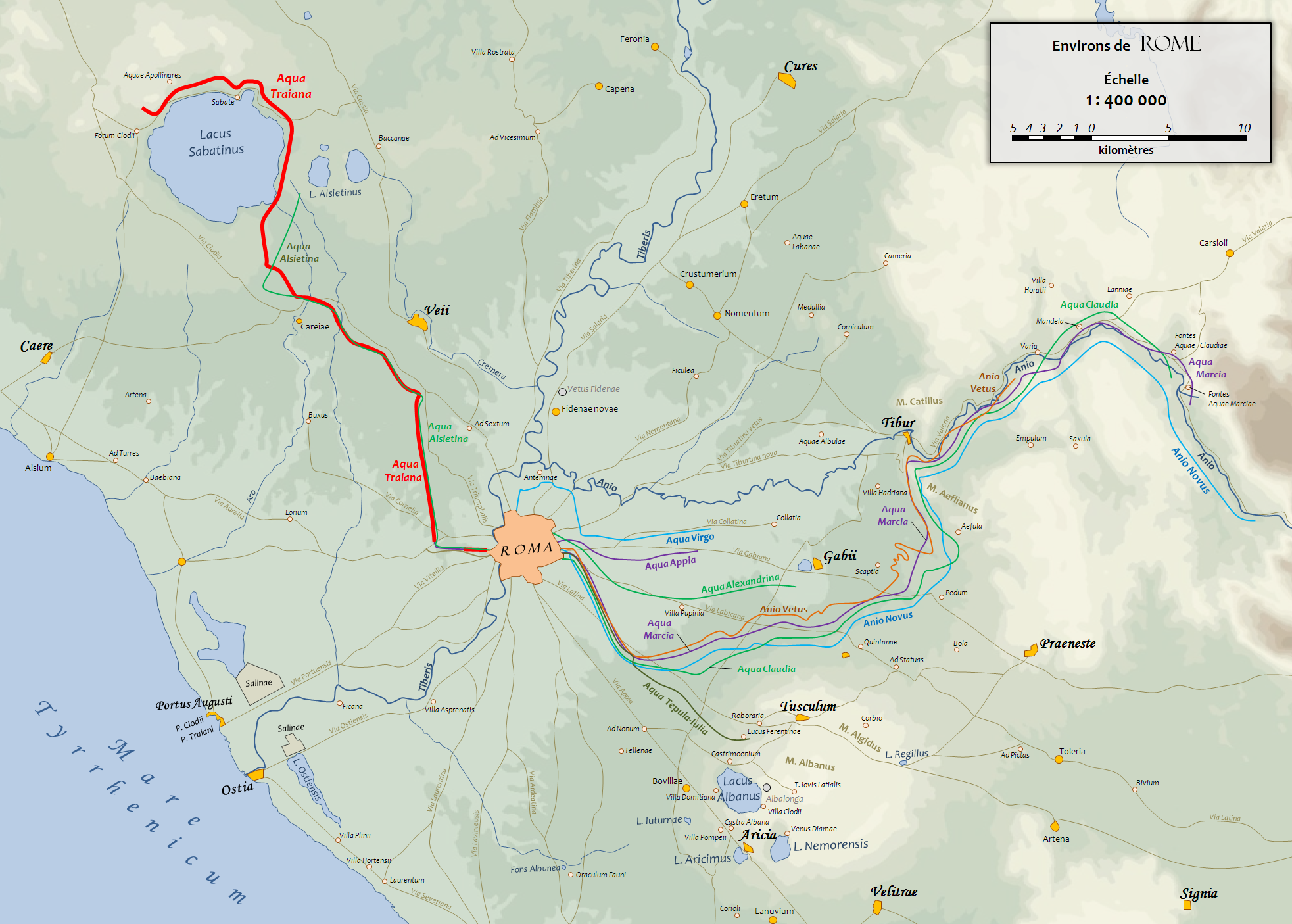
Route of Aqua Traiana shown in red

The Aqua Traiana (later rebuilt and named the Acqua Paola) was a 1st-century Roman aqueduct built by Emperor Trajan and inaugurated in 109 AD. It channelled water from sources around Lake Bracciano, 40 km (25 mi) north-west of Rome, to ancient Rome. It joined the earlier Aqua Alsietina to share a common lower route into Rome.

It had only fallen into disuse in the 17th century.

== History ==
The author Frontinus indicated in c. 98 AD that a new aqueduct was being planned, and completion took about a decade. The inauguration of the aqueduct was recorded in the Fasti Ostienses as being dedicated with great fanfare in 109, and stated that the water was tota urbe salientem (issuing throughout the city).

The date of inauguration was also significant for its intended uses, being only a few months before the Naumachia Traiani, the vast, grandstand-encircled pool on west bank of the Tiber, intended for naval spectacles (and only two days after the Baths of Trajan on the Oppian Hill, in the heart of Rome, overlooking the lower Forum Romanum and Colosseum).

Later the Aqua Traiana powered Rome's important flour mills which became critical to its survival during the Gothic Siege of Rome (537–538) when the Janiculum mills were famously put out of action by the Ostrogoths who cut the urban aqueducts. General Belisarius restored the supply of flour by using mills floating in the Tiber. This aqueduct alone was soon repaired but recent excavations revealed that a major branch of the aqueduct (of two) that had powered the mills was never cleared of its blockage from the siege. Nevertheless, the aqueduct continued to supply the Vatican and western regions of Rome until at least the 9th century.

== Sources of the aqueduct ==
The Aqua Traiana was fed by a collection of aquifer sources around the western and northern sides of Lake Bracciano. The sources were identified in the 19th century in the following groups, running clockwise around the lake from Bracciano:

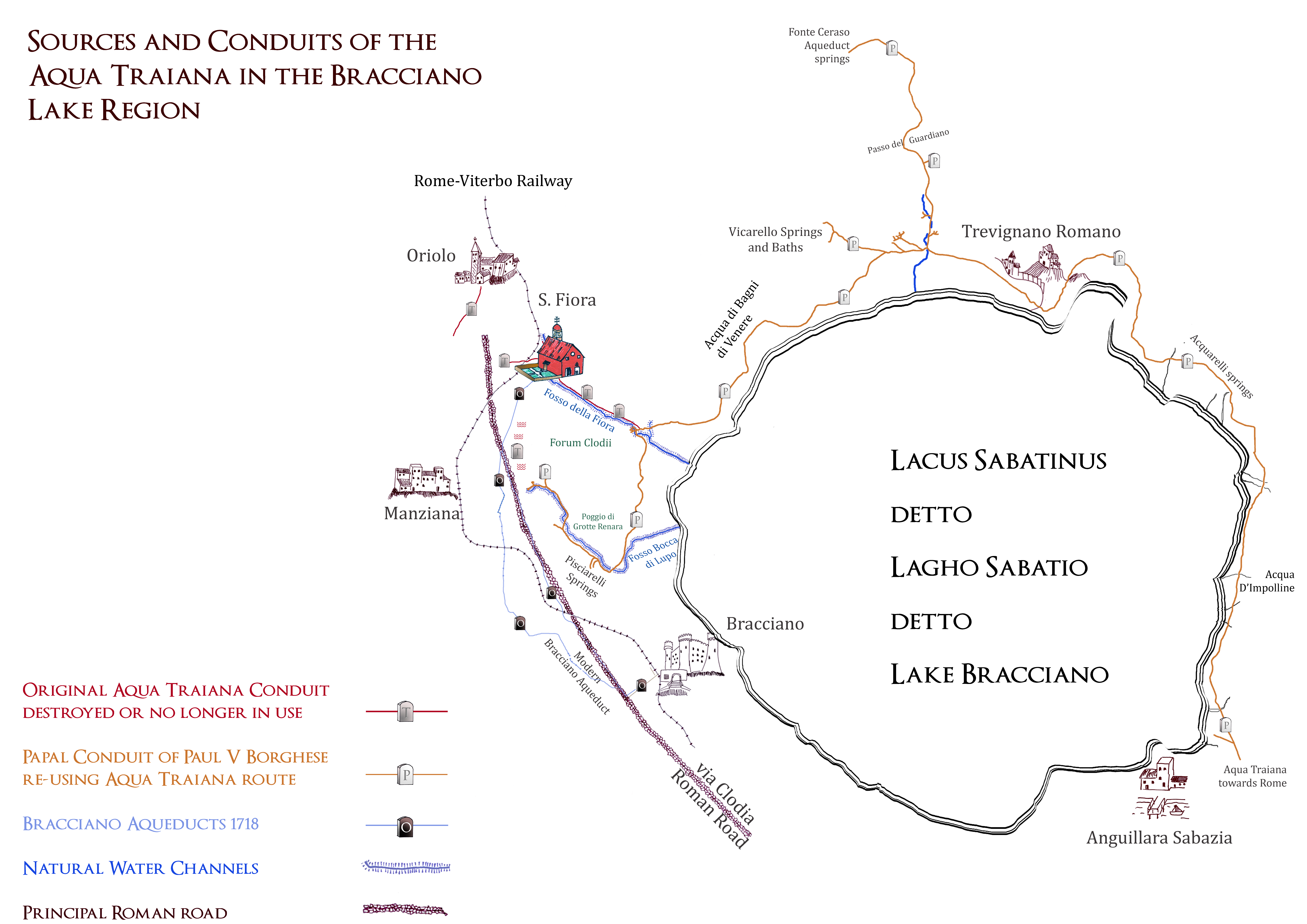
Sources around Lake Bracciano

1. The seven sources in the Villa Flavia / Fosso di Grotta Renara area. These were gathered together into three tanks named by Cassio and Lanciani as Greca, Spineta and Pisciarello. The seventeenth Century architect Carlo Fontana names three tanks as: Botte Greca, Botte Ornava, and Botte Arciprete (Arch-Priest) then places one additional tank further down the Fosso di Grotta Renara as the Botte di Pisciarelli. One tank is currently called 'Fonte Micciaro'.
2. The sources in the Fosso di Fiora area: These include the source at the monumental Fiora Nymphaeum, another source at the 'Carestia' Nymphaeum approx 1 km from the Fiora, which now lies in ruin, but is documented by various maps in the Orsini collection.
3. A collection of sources at the Vicarello Baths
4. One source close to the contemporary Acqua delle Donne Restaurant.
5. The Sette Botti (seven tanks) immediately to the East of the Acqua delle Donna.
6. Various sources to the north of Monte Rocca Romana in the territory of Bassano Romano and along the Fosso Della Calandrina including the notable Fonte Ceraso.
7. The Aquarelli sources to the North East of the Lake.
8. The Acqua D'Impolline due East of the Lake.

The yield of various of these sources were measured and compared in the early 1690s.

Yield of Water Sources in 1692.

The most significant and copious source of the Aqua Traiana was pinpointed as close to the Fosso di Fiora in the modern district of Manziana.

Subsequently little more was published about the sources for over 150 years probably because of the difficulty of accessing the terrain.

Some additional sources of the Trajan aqueduct were identified in 1999 as Acqua Praecilia, located near Manziana. The initial flow of water is enriched along the way by other sources and is carried by the Archi di Boccalupo bridge. At one point there is a hole from which water flows into a collection pool. The height of the Archi di Boccalupo reaches 15 m and it has a brick curtain that alternates with opus reticulatum.

Recent research and in particular publication of the Santa Fiora, the primary source, in 2010 spurred other explorers who have been finding new sources and parts of the network.

== Distribution of Aqua Traiana within Rome ==
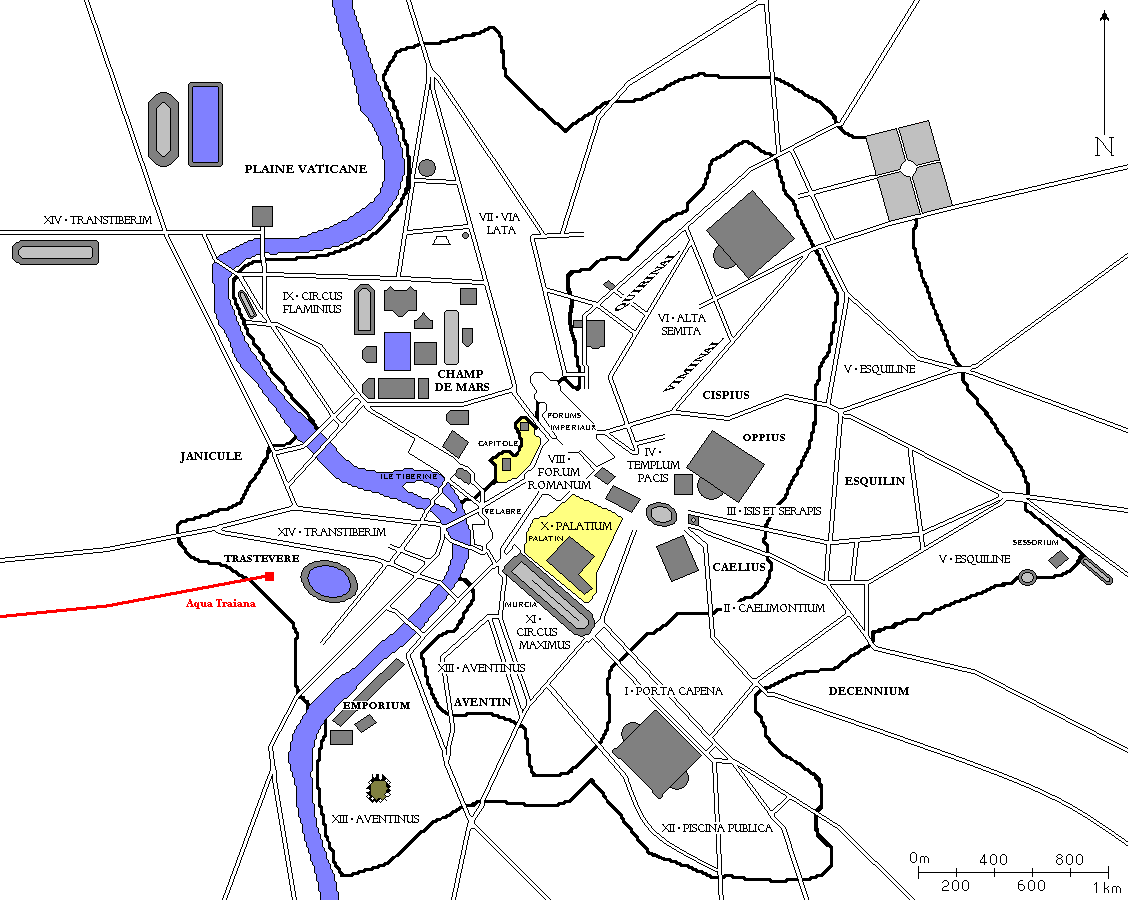
Route of Aqua Traiana within ancient Rome

How distribution was achieved is mostly subject to speculation, but some suggest that the aqueduct crossed the River Tiber on a high bridge in the area of the modern Ponte Sublicio, and curved around the Aventine before heading north to the Oppio.

The aqueduct was found on the Janiculum hill under the present American Academy in Rome by excavations in the 1990s.

It fed a number of water mills on the Janiculum, including a sophisticated mill complex revealed by excavations in the 1990s under the present American Academy in Rome.

== Dilapidation and revival as Acqua Paola ==
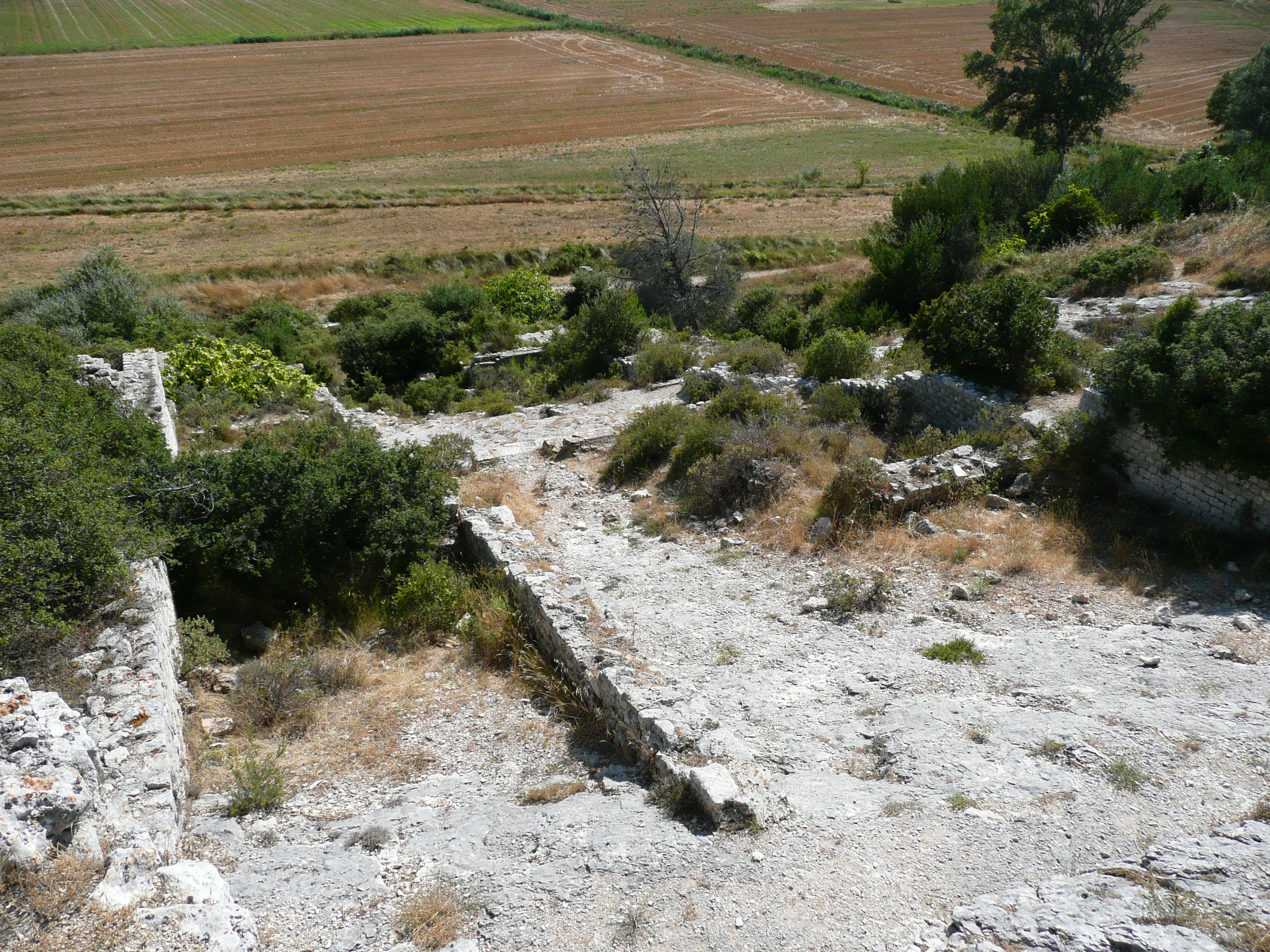
The sixteen overshot wheels at Barbegal are considered the biggest ancient mill complex. Their capacity was sufficient to feed the whole nearby city of Arles

Although the Aqua Traiana, along with all the other aqueducts, was cut by the Ostrogoths in 537, it was the only one restored by Belisarius before his departure in 547 in order to supply water to the grain mills. Over the next few centuries it once again fell in to ruin and ceased to function. It was restored a second time around the year 775 by Pope Adrian I as a way of alleviating the need for the Roman people to carry water in casks from the Tiber to supply the fountains at Saint Peter's Basilica. Subsequently, it once again fell into disrepair.

Camillo Borghese, on his accession in 1605 as Pope Paul V, initiated work on rebuilding the Aqua Traiana, supervised from 1609 by Giovanni Fontana. At that time, the Roman suburbs west of the Tiber River, including the Vatican, were suffering from chronic water shortage. The new pope persuaded the Municipality of Rome to pay for the development of an aqueduct to provide a better water supply to that part of the city.

In 1612, the aqueduct was completed. It was initially called the Acqua Sabbatina or Acqua Bracciano, but was renamed Acqua Paola in honour of Paul V.

Not all original Aqua Traiana sources were available to contribute water to the Aqua Paola. The most copious sources at Santa Fiora, for example, had long since been purloined by duke Paolo Giordano Orsini, who had diverted them to power mills and industry in the city of Bracciano.

The fountain at the end of the aqueduct was referred to as "Il Fontanone" – the Big Fountain – because of its size. It was in the form of a free-standing triumphal arch constructed in white marble with granite columns on high socles. Most of the material was pillaged from the Forum of Nerva. Originally, it consisted of three large central arches, separated by columns, and a smaller one on each side. Water gushed into five basins at the base of each arch. The designer was Paul V's usual architect, Flaminio Ponzio. Among the team of sculptors involved was Ippolito Buzzi, who was responsible for the Borghese coat-of-arms, flanked by the Borghese eagle and dragon, and held aloft by putti, it is presumed to Ponzio's design.

Then, in 1690, Pope Alexander VIII commissioned Carlo Fontana, Giovanni's nephew, to enlarge the fountain. Carlo replaced the five small basins with an enormous single one, the Fontana dell'Acqua Paola, which remains to this day. In more recent times, a small garden has been arranged, hidden behind the structure.

== See also ==
- List of aqueducts in the city of Rome
- List of aqueducts in the Roman Empire
- List of Roman aqueducts by date
- Parco degli Acquedotti
- Ancient Roman technology
- Roman engineering
