= Villa Aldobrandini =

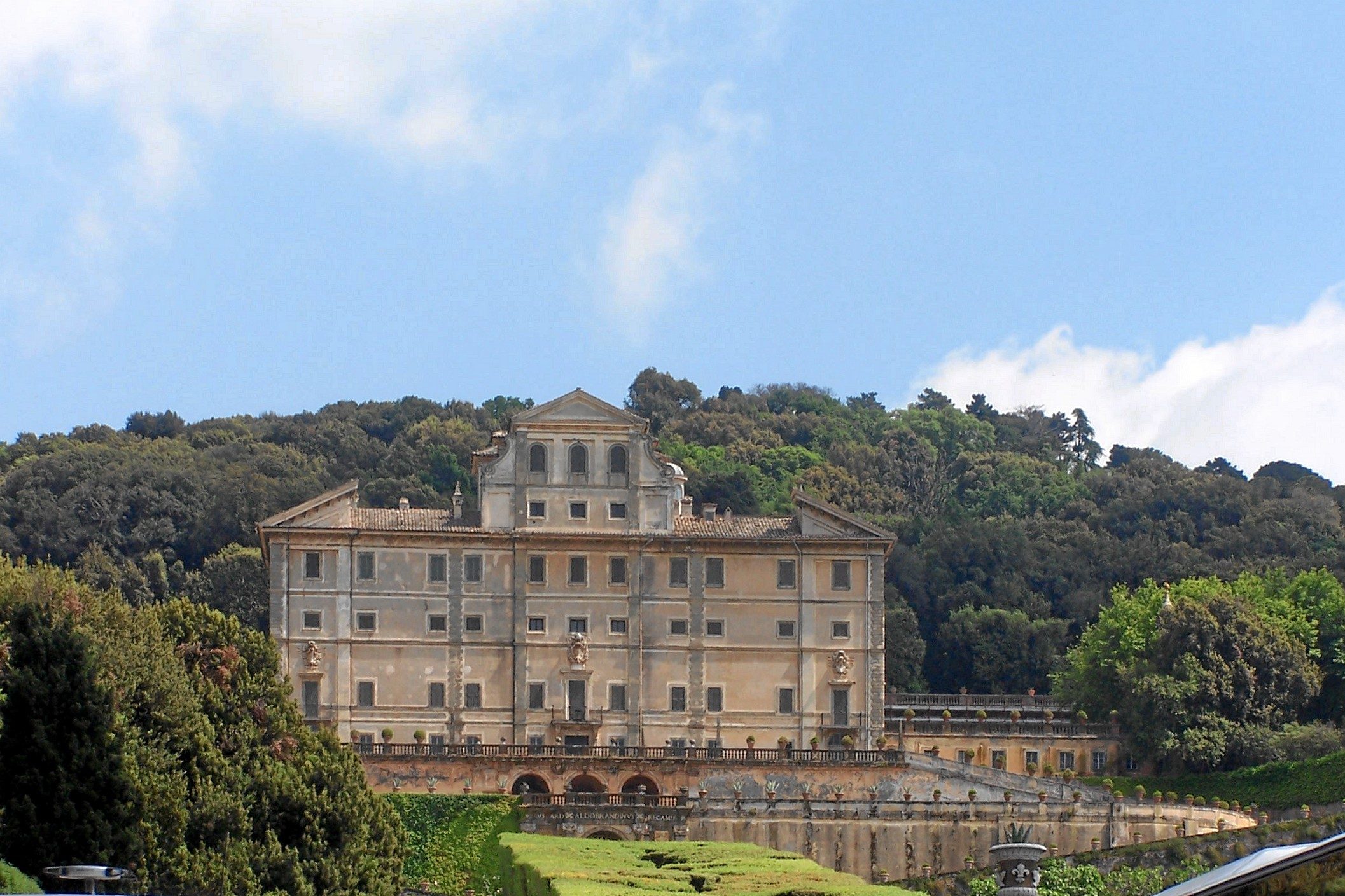
- The façade of Villa Aldobrandini
- Click on the map for a fullscreen view

General information
- Location: Rome
- Coordinates: 41°48′12.4″N 12°40′58.9″E

The Villa Aldobrandini is a villa in Frascati, Italy. It is still owned and lived in by the Aldobrandini family, and known as Belvedere for its location overlooking the valley toward the city of Rome.

It is the only grand Papal garden not owned by the state.

== Construction ==
Roman prelate Alessandro Rufini built the original villa in 1550. Pope Clement VIII gave his nephew Cardinal Pietro Aldobrandini the villa in 1598 as a reward for the negotiations he undertook with France that resulted in the peace treaty of 1595 and for his role in annexing Ferrara to the Papal States.

== Conversion ==
Aldobrandini commissioned the Roman architect Giacomo della Porta to convert the villa into suitable accommodation in which a Cardinal could live and also entertain a Pope. Works started in 1598. While the core of the villa was completed by the time of Giacomo della Porta's death in 1603, work continued for another 20 years on the various aspects of the villa and the garden under the supervision of Carlo Maderno, who added the loggia, and Giovanni Fontana.

The villa is aligned with the cathedral down its axial avenue that is continued through the town as Viale Catone. The villa has an imposing 17th century facade and some other interesting architectural and environmental features, such as the double gallery order on the rear facade, the spiral-shaped flights, the large exedra of the Water Theatre and a magnificent park.

== Art ==
Inside the villa are paintings of Mannerist and Baroque artists like Taddeo Zuccari and his brother Federico, Cavalier D'Arpino and Domenichino. On the grounds is a monumental gate by Carlo Francesco Bizzaccheri (early 18th century).

== Water Theater ==
A noted feature of the garden is the Teatro delle Acque ("Water Theater") by Carlo Maderno and Orazio Olivieri. To provide water for this feature and for the rest of the garden, Aldobrandini constructed a new 8 kilometres (5 mi) long aqueduct from the Modena spring on Monte Algido to the villa.

The top of the garden in the villa has remained derelict and damaged since the American bombing during the Allied invasion in World War II, and the fountains of Teatro delle Acqua sustained damage as well from the bombing, with current owner Prince Camillo Aldobrandini's father carrying out repairs to the fountains shortly after. However, having used cement, the fountains were in a bad state when Prince Camillo began restoration works in 2011. Prince Camillo stated that Napoleon, who was related to the Aldobrandini's through marriage, took statues that were all along the top of the balustrade of the Teatro and said he would pay Aldobrandini after coming back from Russia.

Villa Aldobrandini - Ninfeo.
