= Aldobrandini Madonna =

Aldobrandini Madonna may refer to:

- The Garvagh Madonna, also known as the Aldobrandini Madonna and Aldobrandini-Garvagh Madonna, a painting by Raphael
- The Aldobrandini Madonna (Titian)
