= Domenico Fontana =

Italian architect born in today's Ticino (1543–1607)

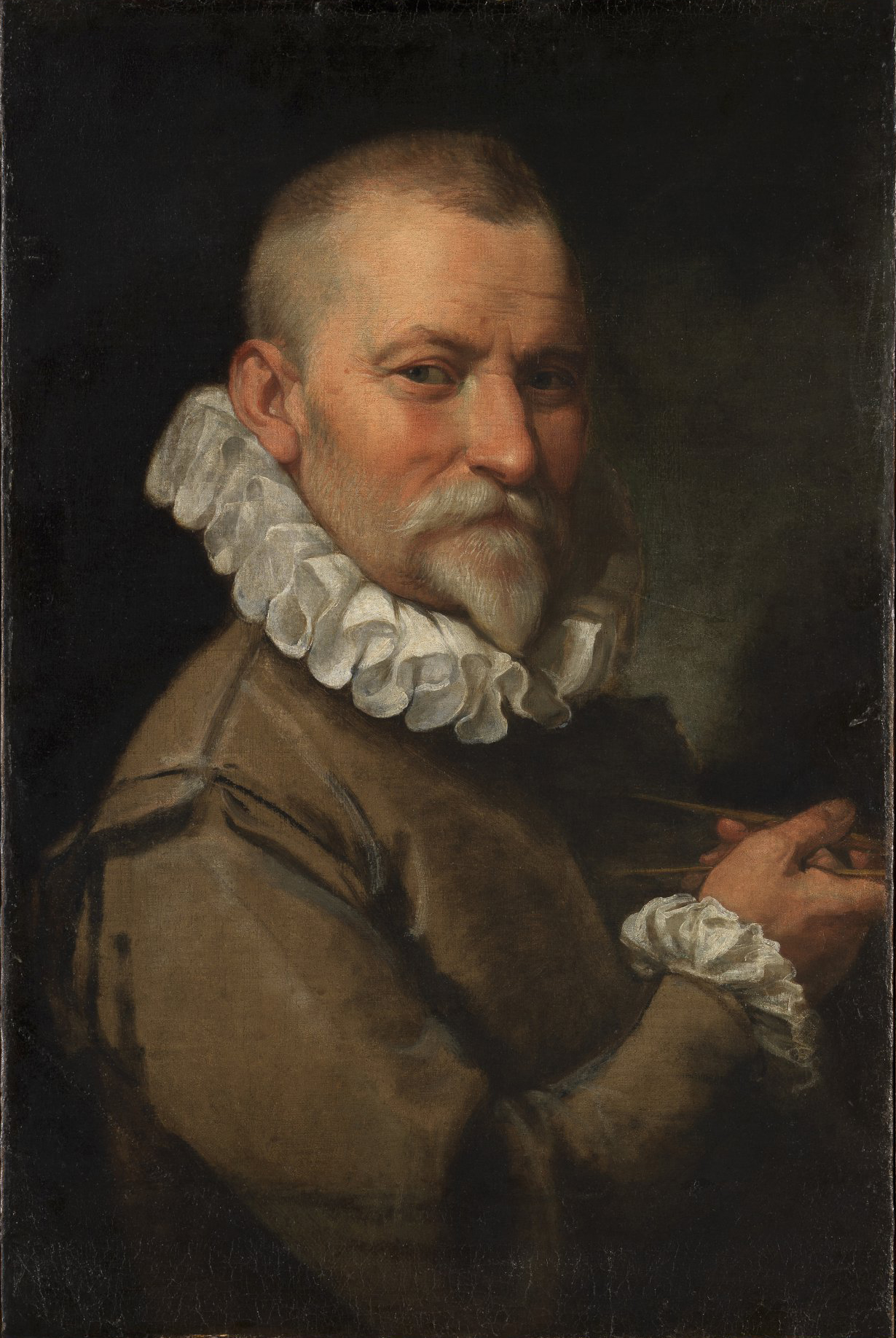
Domenico Fontana by Federico Zuccari

Domenico Fontana (1543 – 28 June 1607) was an Italian architect of the late Renaissance, born in today's Ticino. He worked primarily in Italy, in Rome and Naples.

== Biography ==
He was born at Melide, a village on Lake Lugano, at that time joint possession of some Swiss cantons of the old Swiss Confederacy, and presently part of Ticino, Switzerland, and died at Naples. He went to Rome in 1563, to join his elder brother. He began his career as a plasterer, and then as a mason and master builder, with particular expertise in measuring and technical skills.

Fontana's first architectural project was a villa in the Piazza Pasquino for Cardinal Montalto, constructed between 1577 and 1578. Montalto later entrusted him in 1584 with the erection of the Cappella del Presepio (Chapel of the Manger) in Basilica di Santa Maria Maggiore, a powerful domed building over a Greek cross. It is a marvellously well-balanced structure, notwithstanding the profusion of detail and overloading of rich ornamentation, which in no way interferes with the main architectural scheme. It is crowned by a dome in the early style of S. Mario at Montepulciano.

For the same patron, he constructed the Palazzo Montalto near Santa Maria Maggiore, with its skilful distribution of masses and tied decorative scheme of reliefs and festoons, impressive because of the dexterity with which the artist adapted the plan to the site at his disposal. After the cardinal's accession as Sixtus V, he appointed Fontana Architect Of St. Peter's, bestowing upon him, among other distinctions, the title of Knight of the Golden Spur. Fontana added the lantern to the dome of St. Peter's and proposed the prolongation of the interior in a well-defined nave.

Of more importance were the alterations he made in Basilica di San Giovanni in Laterano (c. 1586), where he introduced into the loggia of the north facade an imposing double arcade of wide span and ample sweep, and probably added the two-story portico the Scala Santa. This predilection for arcades as essential features of an architectural scheme was brought out in the fountains designed by Domenico and his brother Giovanni, e.g. the Fontana dell'Acqua Paola, or the Fontana di Termini planned along the same lines. He became a member of the Accademia di San Luca in 1585.

Among secular buildings his strong restrained style, with its suggestion from Jacopo Barozzi da Vignola, is best exemplified in the Lateran Palace (begun in 1586), in which the vigorous application of sound structural principles and power of co-ordination are undeniable, but also the utter lack of imagination and barren monotony of style. It was characteristic of him to remain satisfied with a single solution to an architectural problem, as shown in the fact that he later reapplied the motif of the Lateran Palace in the Apostolic Palace, and in the additions to the Quirinal Palace.

Fontana also designed the transverse arms separating the courts of the Vatican.

== Egyptian obelisks ==
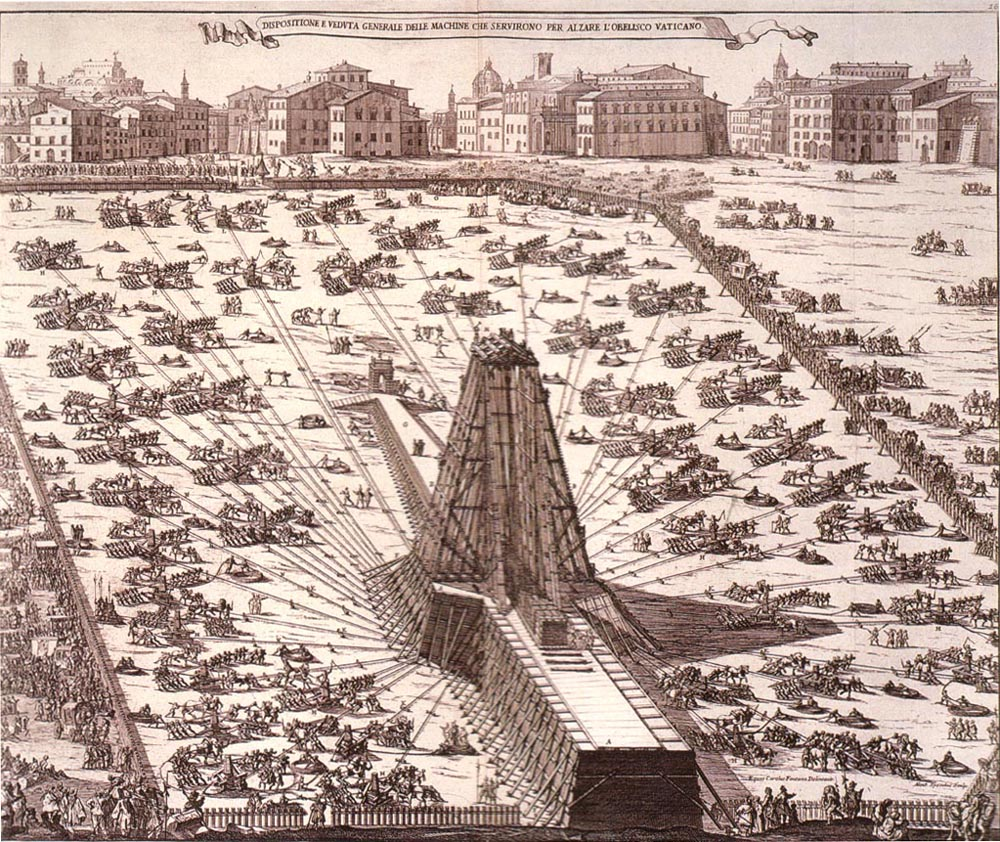
Re-erection of the obelisk on Saint Peter's Square in 1586

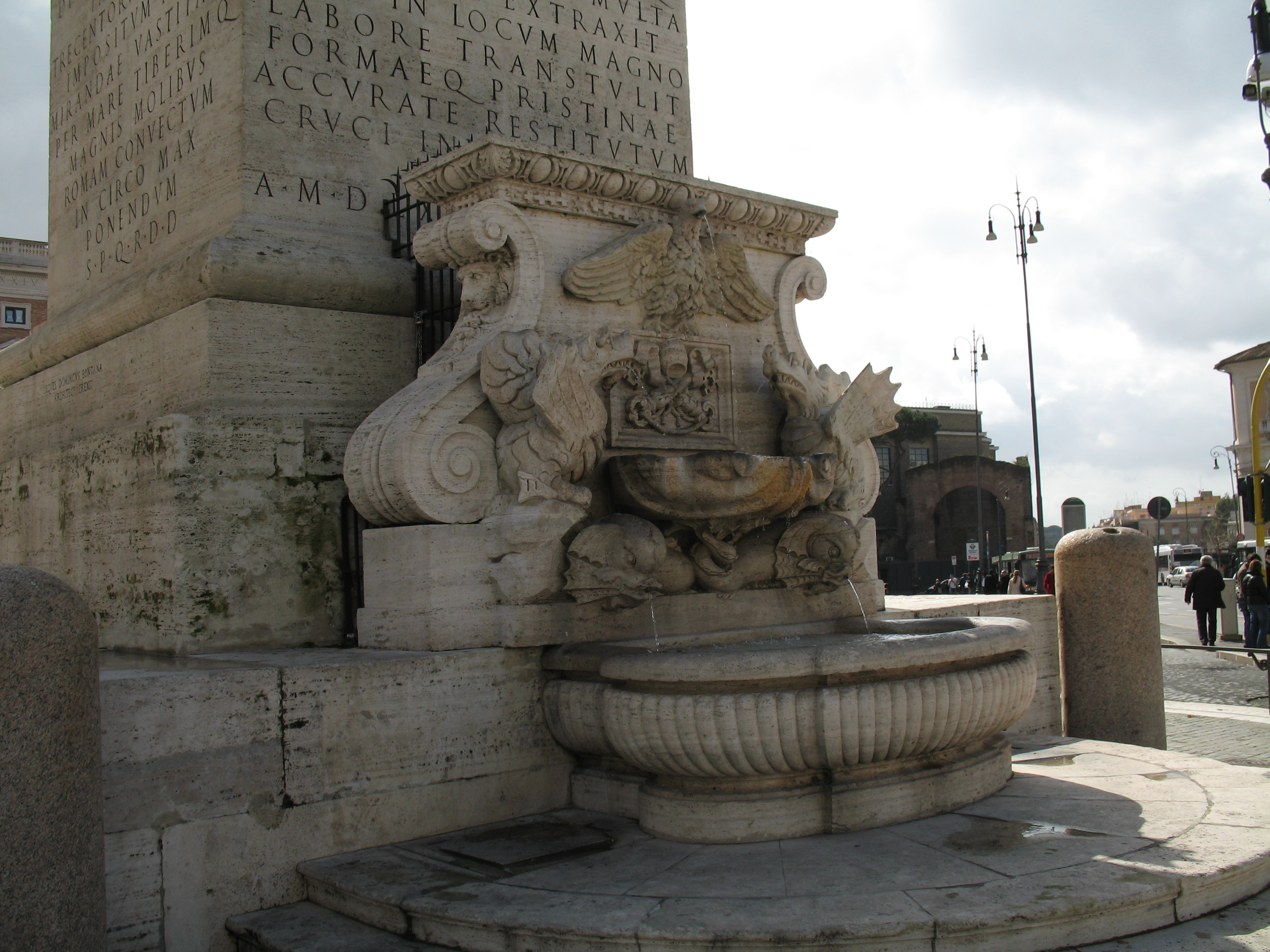
Fountain in the pedestal of the Lateran obelisk, designed by Fontana

In 1586 he erected the 320-ton Vatican obelisk in St. Peter's Square. This feat of engineering took the concerted effort of 800 men, 160 horses and countless pulleys and metres of rope.

He gives a detailed account of it in Della transportatione dell'obelisco Vaticano e delle fabriche di Sisto V (Rome, 1590). The astronomer Ignazio Danti is known to have assisted Fontana in this work.

Fontana also used his knowledge of statics, which aroused universal astonishment at the time, in the erection of three other ancient obelisks on the Piazza del Popolo, Piazza di S. Maria Maggiore, and Piazza di S. Giovanni in Laterano.

== Other works ==
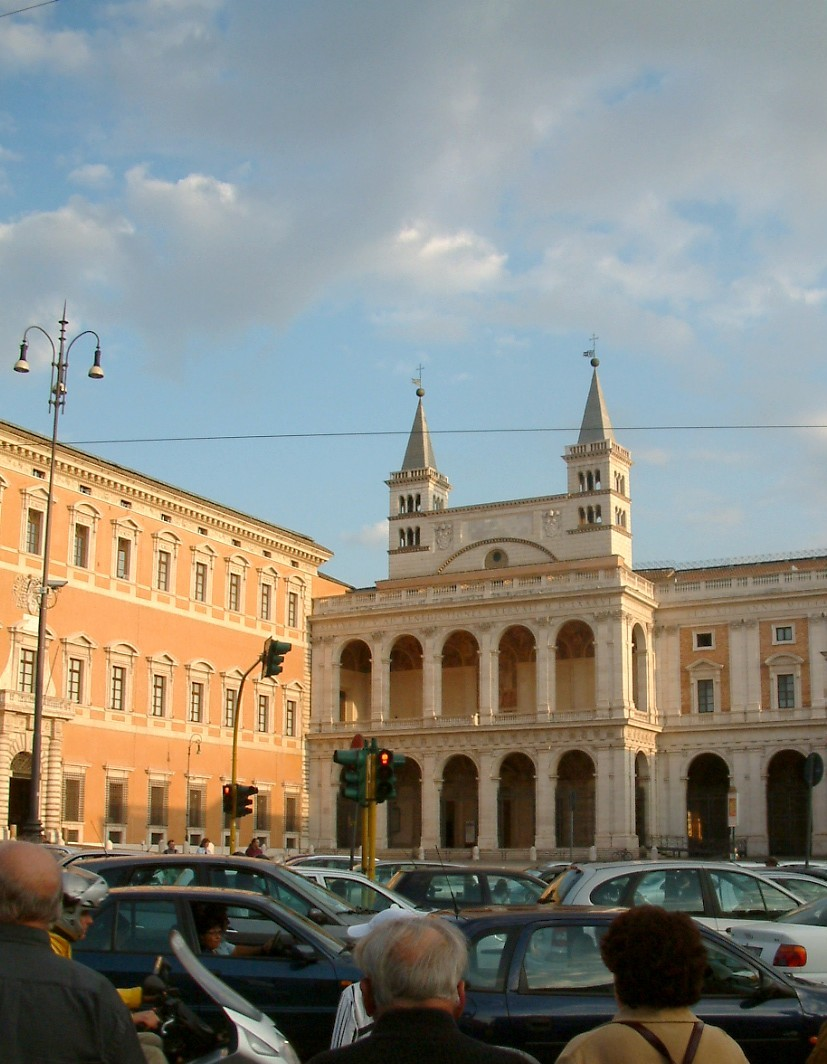
San Giovanni: north facade.

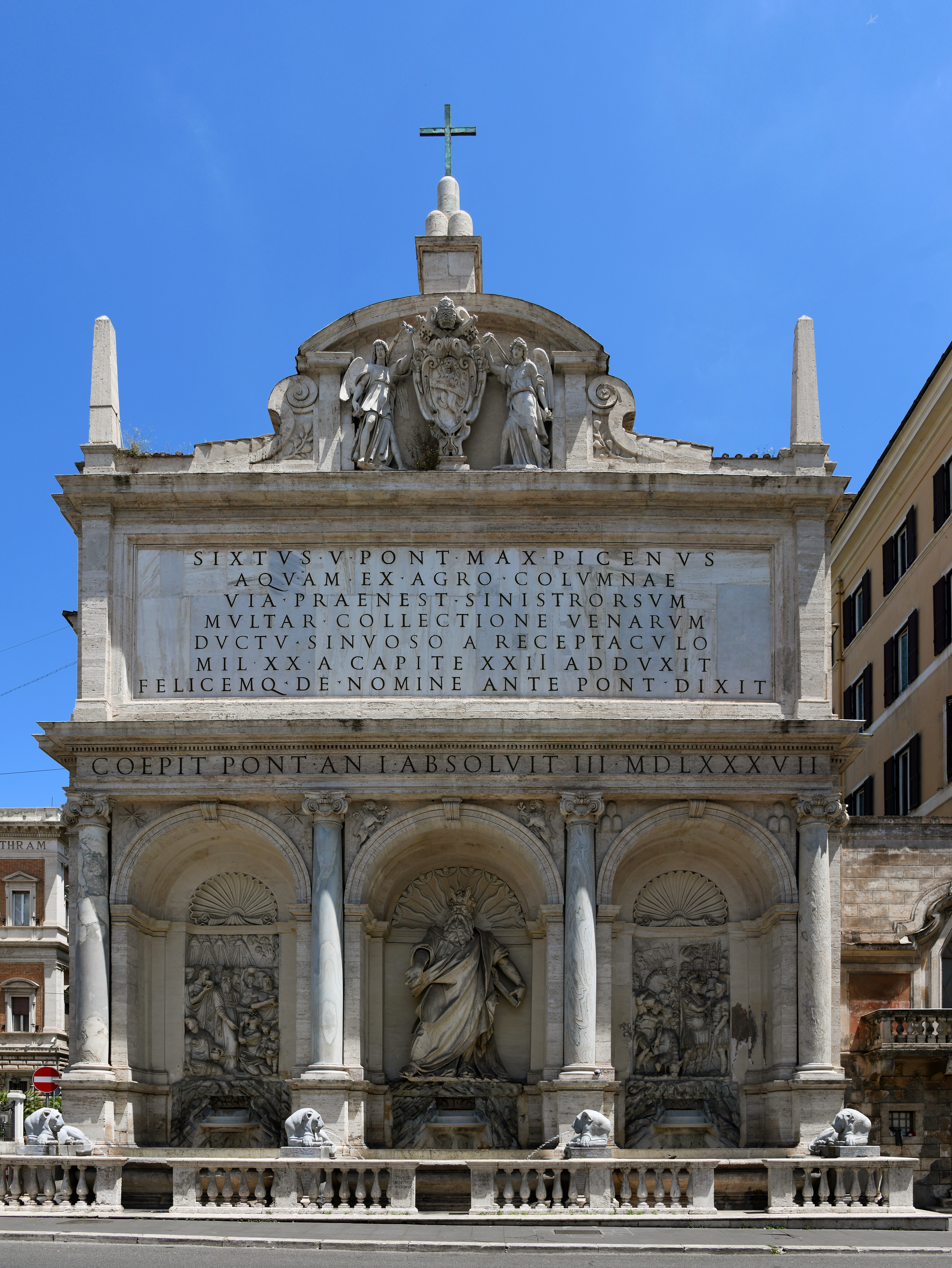
Fountain of Moses in Rome.

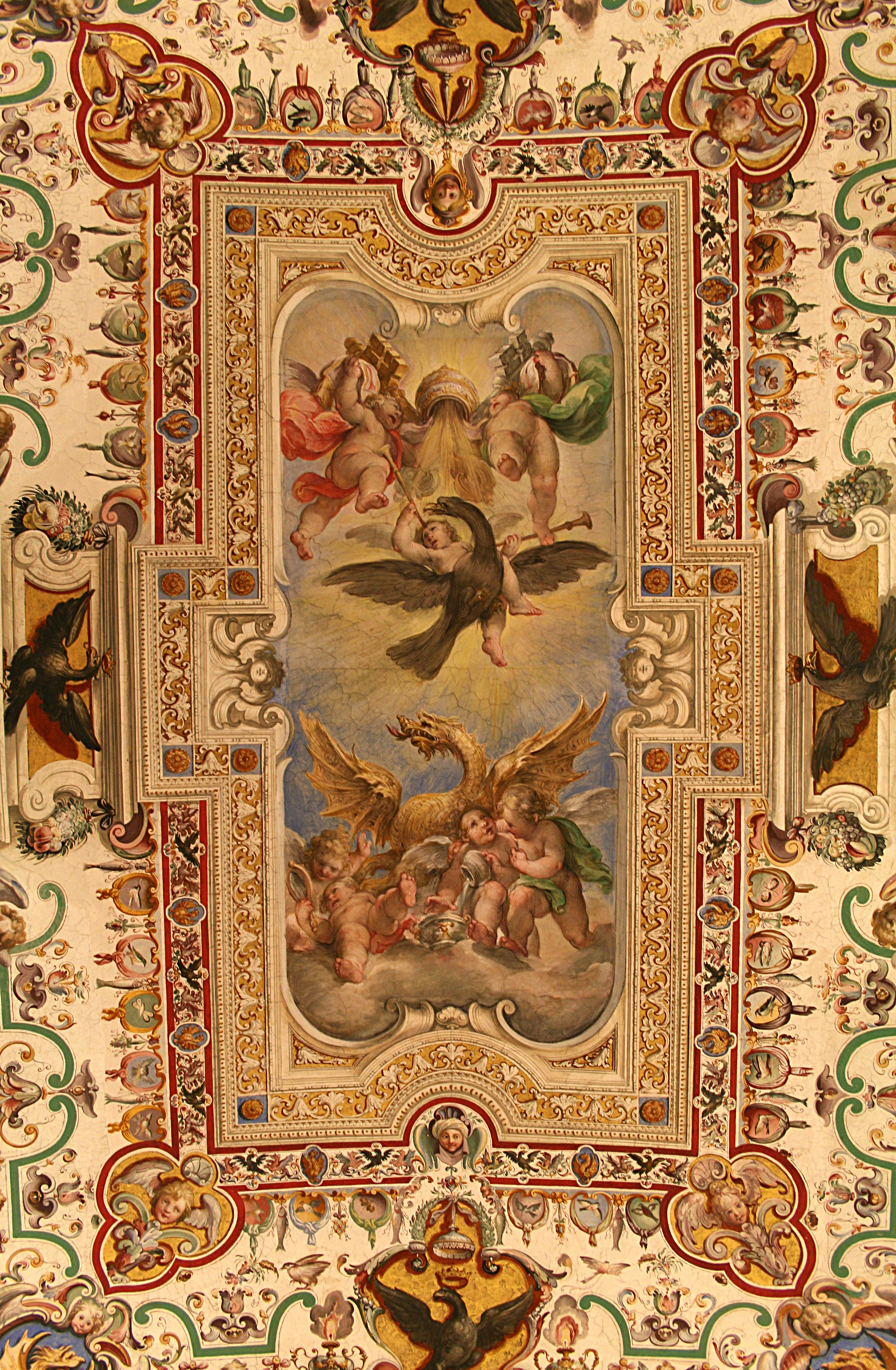
Ceiling design for Sale Sistine - Vatican Library

After his patron's death, he continued for some time in the service of his successor, Pope Clement VIII. Soon, however, dissatisfaction with his style, envy, and the charge that he had misappropriated public money, caused him to be dismissed from his post, and he was driven to Naples. There he accepted the appointment of architect to the Viceroy, Juan de Zúñiga, 1st Duke of Peñaranda. During this time, it is notable that a crew working for him building a canal was the first to confirm the location of the ancient city of Pompeii. In addition to designing canals, he erected the Royal Palace of Naples.

He died in 1607, and was buried in the church of Sant'Anna dei Lombardi.

Domenico's brother Giovanni Fontana was also an architect, and his son Giulio Cesare succeeded him as Royal Architect in Naples.

== See also ==
- History of cranes

== Works ==
- Domenico Fontana. Della transportatione dell'obelisco Vaticano e delle fabriche di Sisto V. Rome 1590.
  - Online edition, from New York Public Library.
  - Online edition, from Rare Book Room.
