= Leonardo Sormani =

Italian sculptor

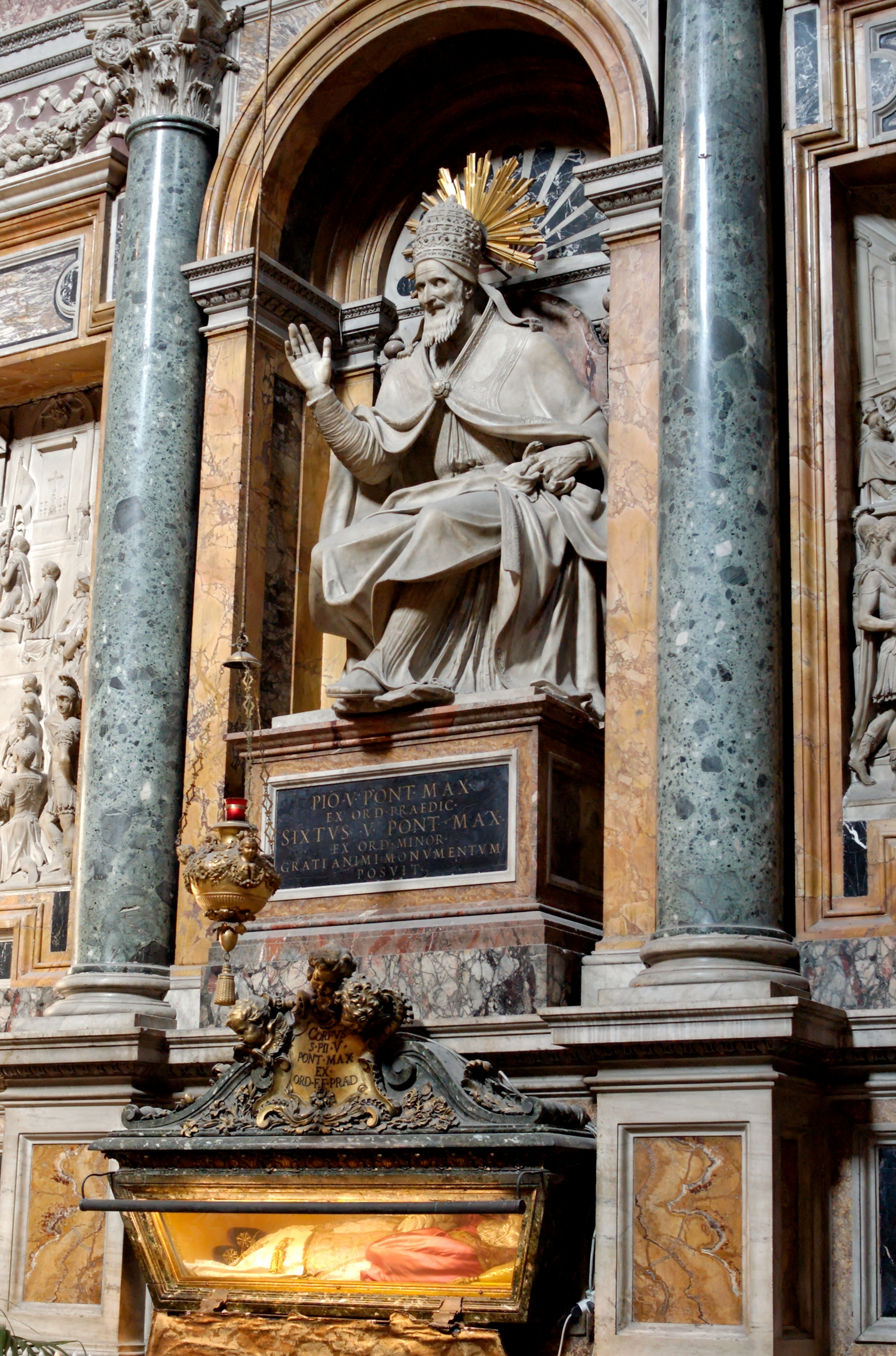
Statue of seated Pope Pius V found in the Sistine Chapel of Santa Maria Maggiore

Leonardo Sormani (active ca 1550- ca 1590) was an Italian sculptor active in Rome during the Renaissance. Details of his life are not well known, and authors seemingly refer to him by different names: Giorgio Vasari spoke of a Lionardo Milanese; Giovanni Baglione wrote biographical details of a Lionardo da Serzana or Sarzana; while by the 1670s Giovanni Vincenzo Verzellino and Raffaele Soprani tried to distinguish Vasari's Lionardo from a Leonardo Sormani, originally from Savona. These names, however, appear to refer to the same sculptor. Attributions however of individual works are difficult.

Sarzana appears to have been a restorer as well as a sculptor. Works attributed to Sarzana include:

- Seated statue of Pope Pius V (died 1572) made for the Papal tomb at the Sistine Chapel at Santa Maria Maggiore, commissioned by Cardinal Peretti, soon to be Sixtus V
- Bust of Cardinal Rodolfo Pio da Carpi (died 1564) in the Church of Santa Trinità dei Monti, Rome
- Saints Peter and Paul for the chapel of Cardinal Giovanni Ricci of Montepulciano in San Pietro in Montorio.
- Contributions to statues in the tomb of Pope Nicholas IV in Santa Maria Maggiore
- Contributions to the statue of Moses for the Fountain of Acqua Felice in Rome
- Statue of enthroned Pope Paul III Farnese
