= Fontana dell'Acqua Paola =

Large fountain in Rome

- Fountain
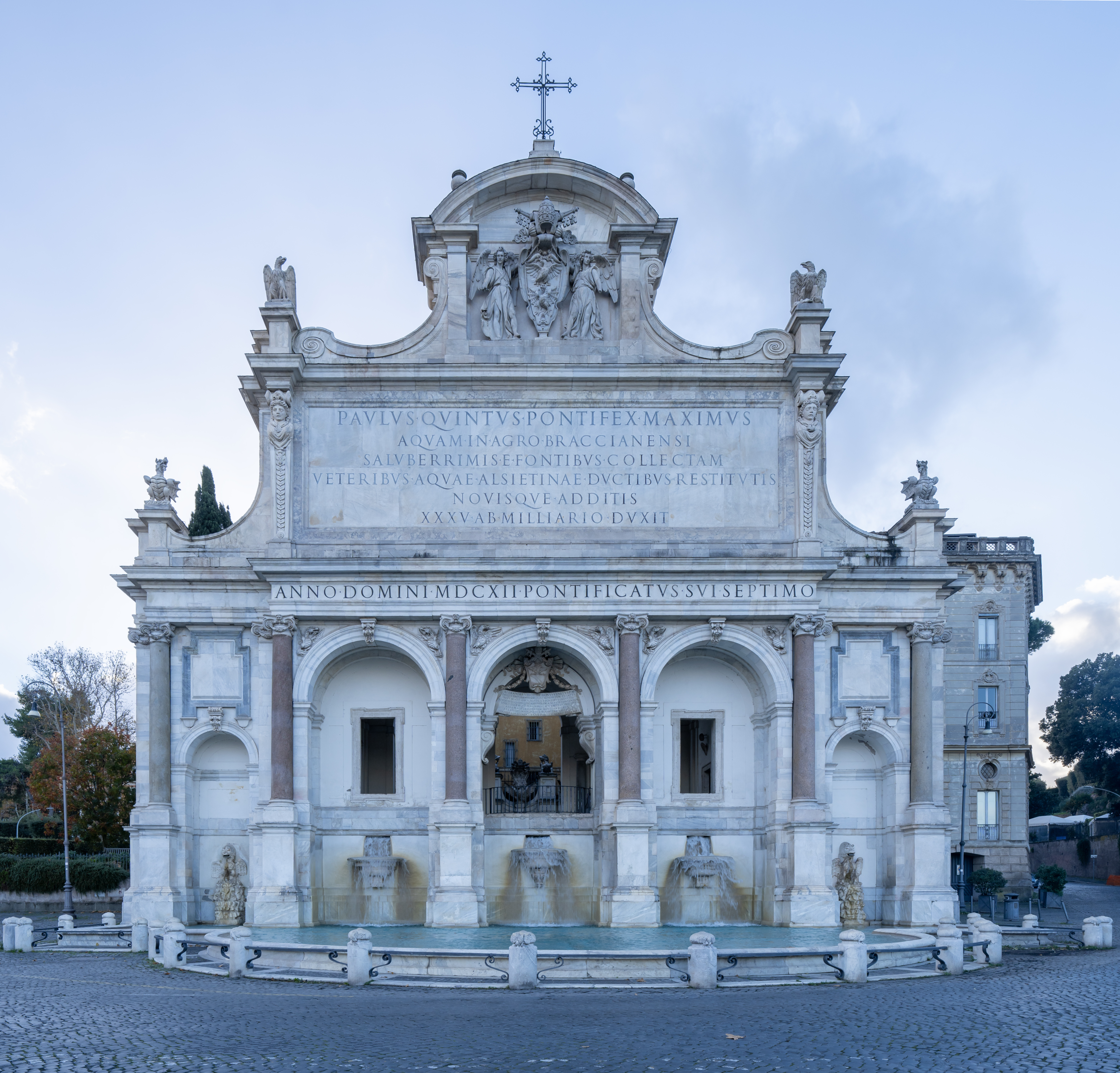
- Fontana dell'Acqua Paola, or Il Fontanone
- Location: Rome, Italy
- Interactive map of Fontana dell'Acqua Paola
- Coordinates: 41°53′20″N 12°27′51″E

The Fontana dell'Acqua Paola, also known as Il Fontanone ("The big fountain") or Mostra dell'Acqua Paola, is a monumental fountain located on the Janiculum Hill, near the church of San Pietro in Montorio, in Rome, Italy. It was built in 1612 to mark the end of the Acqua Paola aqueduct, restored by Pope Paul V, and took its name from him. It was the first major fountain on the right bank of the River Tiber.

== History ==
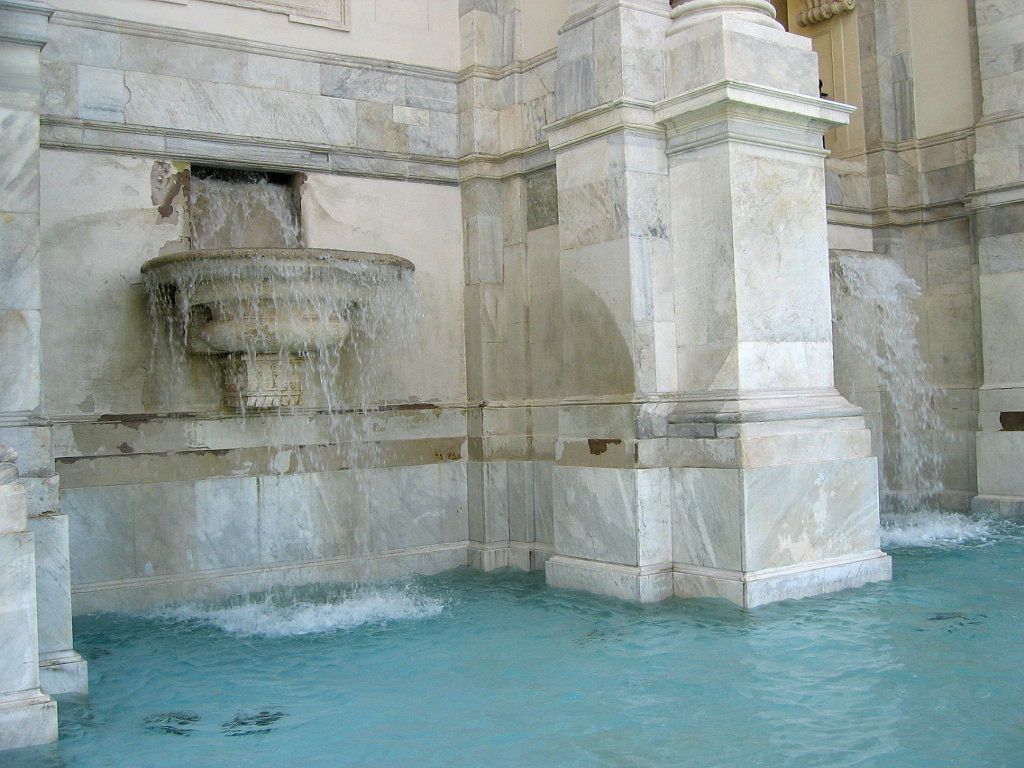
Fontana dell'Acqua Paola (detail)

The Fontana dell'Acqua Paola was inspired by the popularity of the Fontana dell'Acqua Felice, built in 1585–1588 by Pope Sixtus V. Pope Paul V decided to rebuild and extend the ruined Acqua Traiana aqueduct built by the Emperor Trajan in order to create a source of clean drinking water for the residents of the Janiculum Hill, who were forced to take their water from brackish springs or from the polluted Tiber. He raised funds for his project in part by imposing a tax upon wine, which caused complaints among some residents. The funding from this tax and other sources allowed him to purchase the rights to the water of a spring near Lake Bracciano, not far from Rome, as the source for the fountain.

The fountain was designed by Giovanni Fontana, whose brother had worked on the Fontana dell'Acqua Felice, and Flaminio Ponzio. They used white marble from the nearby ruins of the Roman Temple of Minerva in the Forum of Nerva, and constructed a massive gateway of five arches for the arrival of the water. At the top of the fountain are the papal tiara and keys, above the Borghese family coat of arms of an eagle and a dragon, supported by angels. The inscription praises Pope Paul in poetic terms for bringing water to the residents of the district.

Unlike the Fontana dell'Acqua Felice, which had an abundance of statues on biblical themes, the theme of the Fontana dell'Acqua Paola was water. Five abundant streams poured through the arches into five marble basins. In 1690 Carlo Fontana designed an additional semicircular pool for the water which overflowed from the marble basins. Marble posts were put in place to keep coachmen from watering their animals in the fountain, but the pool was tempting to many local residents, who bathed in the water. An ordinance was issued in 1707 forbidding residents to bathe in the fountain.

The form of the fountain served as an inspiration for the later Trevi Fountain.

In 2019, a Fendi-sponsored campaign paid for a partial renovation of the fountain. Actor Carlo Verdone reminisced on the fact that, growing up in Rome, the expression "you're as good as Acqua Paola water" ("vali como l'acqua Paola") was meant as an insult, the water coming from the lake Bracciano being considered of poor quality back then.

== Dedication ==
The Latin dedicatory inscription atop the fountain reads:

PAVLVS⸱QVINTVS⸱PONTIFEX⸱MAXIMVS
AQVAM⸱IN⸱AGRO⸱BRACCIANENSI
SALVBERRIMIS⸱E⸱FONTIBVS⸱COLLECTAM
VETERIBVS⸱AQVAE⸱ALSIETINAE⸱DVCTIBVS⸱RESTITVTIS
NOVISQVE⸱ADDITIS
XXXV⸱AB⸱MILLIARIO⸱DVXIT
ANNO⸱DOMINI⸱MDCXII⸱PONTIFICATVS⸱SVI⸱SEPTIMO

The English line-for-line translation:

Paul the Fifth, Supreme Pontiff [brought]
water from the region of Bracciano,
gathered from the most healthy sources,
by restoring old channels of the Alsietina* water aqueduct
and adding new ones,
from 35 mile-stones away
in the year of the Lord 1612, the seventh year of his pontificate.

* Note: the dedication misidentifies the restored aqueduct as the Alsietina aqueduct, built by emperor Augustus in 2 B.C.E. to supply a Naumachia, a large artificial lake used to stage mock naval combat for entertainment. However, the quality of the water from the Alsietina was poor, and Pope Paul instead restored the aqueduct Traiana, built by emperor Trajan around 109 C.E.

== In music ==
The American composer Charles T. Griffes wrote a character piece for piano entitled "The Fountains of Acqua Paola" as part of his Roman Sketches, Op. 7 (composed 1915–16). Griffes never visited Rome or Italy. Rather, the pieces in his collection were inspired by a collection of poems by William Sharp entitled Sospiri di Roma (1891).

== In cinema ==
The Great Beauty by Paolo Sorrentino opens with a scene taking place in front of the fountain.

== See also ==
- List of fountains in Rome

== Sources ==
- D'Onofrio, Cesare, Le Fontane di Roma, con documenti e disegni inediti, 2nd edition, Rome, 1962
- Sanfilippo, Mario, Fountains of Rome, Milan, 1996.
- Marilyn Symmes, (editor), Fountains, Splash and Spectacle - Water and Design from the Renaissance to the Present. Thames and Hudson, in association with the Cooper-Hewitt National Design Museum and Smithsonian Institution. 1998.

Preceded by Fontana dell'Acqua Felice	Landmarks of Rome; Fontana dell'Acqua Paola	Succeeded by Babuino
