= Giovanni Fontana (architect) =

Italian architect

Giovanni Fontana (Melide, 1540 – Rome, 1614) was a late-Mannerist architect, as well as brother of Domenico Fontana, and uncle of architect Carlo Maderno.

== Life ==
Fontana began his career as an architect as an assistant to Giacomo della Porta, implementing designs by Michelangelo. In 1585 he was commissioned to design the Arch of Pope Sixtus V by Pope Sixtus V, who two years later completely rebuilt the church of San Girolamo dei Croati for the Croatian-speaking community in Rome, to designs by Fontana and Martino Longhi the Elder. In 1596 he undertook some engineering projects, such as the draining of the Rieti Valley which was commissioned by pope Clement VIII.

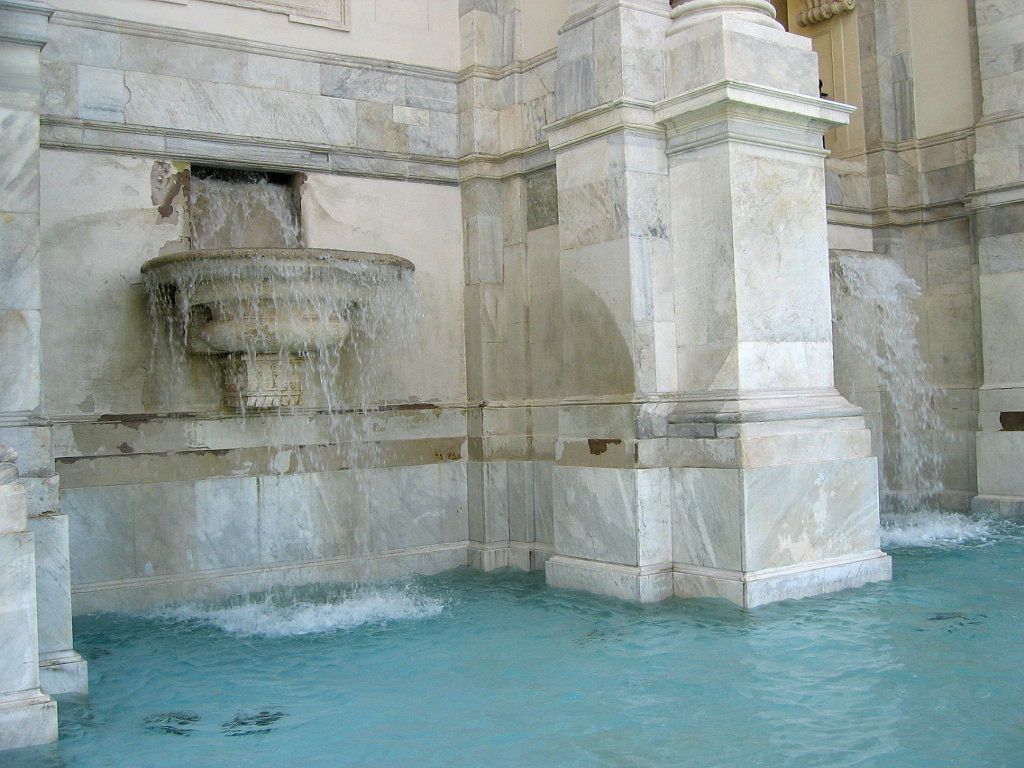
Fontana dell'Acqua Paola

He built one of the most important rural villas of the Roman Campagna in 1601–1605 for the Aldobrandini family. Castello di Torrenova was originally a medieval farmhouse that Fontana enlarged and embellished with Renaissance details and crenellated walls. Next to the castle, a small late Renaissance church was built dedicated to Saint Clement, the patron saint of the Aldobrandini Pope, Clement VIII. He also worked on the garden of Cardinal Pietro Aldobrandini's Villa Aldobrandini in Frascati.

Fontana was the first great architect-engineer who carved out a role in hydraulics, which deals with the levelling of land, the conduct of canals, and the control of the speed of water. He brought water back to Rome by reorganizing and exploiting the hydraulic works of the past. Around 1612, Pope Paul V commissioned Fontana to design the Fontana dell'Acqua Paola on the Janiculum to create a source of clean drinking water for the residents. The form of the fountain served as an inspiration for the later Trevi Fountain.
