= Sefton Council elections =

Local government elections in Merseyside, England

Sefton Metropolitan Borough Council elections are generally held three years out of every four, with a third of the council being elected each time. Sefton Metropolitan Borough Council, generally known as Sefton Council, is the local authority for the metropolitan borough of Sefton in Merseyside, England. Since the last boundary changes in 2004, 66 councillors have been elected from 22 wards.

== Council elections ==
Year	Conservative	Labour	Liberal Democrats‡	Independent	Other	Control	Notes
1973	37	24	3	2	3 Ratepayers	Conservative	
1975	40	22	3	2	2 Ratepayers	Conservative	
1976	43	21	3	1	1 Ratepayers	Conservative	
1978	44	21	3	0	1 Ratepayers	Conservative	
1979	41	23	4	0	1 Ratepayers	Conservative	New ward boundaries.
1980	39	22	5	1	2 Ratepayers	Conservative	
1982	39	20	5	1	4 SDP	Conservative	
1983	39	21	7	1	1 SDP	Conservative	
1984	36	22	9	1	1 SDP	Conservative	
1986	30	24	12	0	2 SDP, 1 vacancy	No overall control	
1987	27	24	15	0	3 SDP	No overall control	
1988	25	24	20	0	0	No overall control	
1990	24	27	18	0	0	No overall control	
1991	22	27	20	0	0	No overall control	
1992	25	27	17	0	0	No overall control	
1994	24	26	19	0	0	No overall control	
1995	21	29	19	0	0	No overall control	
1996	13	32	24	0	0	No overall control	
1998	14	31	23	1	0	No overall control	
1999	15	30	24	0	0	No overall control	
2000	19	22	25	0	0	No overall control	New ward boundaries, number of seats reduced from 69 to 66.
2002	16	26	21	0	3	No overall control	
2003	17	25	21	0	3	No overall control	
2004	19	20	27	0	0	No overall control	Whole council elected after boundary changes.
2006	19	21	26	0	0	No overall control	
2007	18	22	26	0	0	No overall control	
2008	18	21	27	0	0	No overall control	
2010	15	23	28	0	0	No overall control	
2011	14	28	23	0	1 UKIP	No overall control	
2012	8	36	20	2	0	Labour	
2014	7	40	17	2	0	Labour	
2015	7	42	16	0	1 Independent Conservative, 1 Community action not politics	Labour	
2016	6	38	17	4	1 Independent Conservative	Labour	
2018	8	43	12	3	0	Labour	
2019	6	43	12	3	2 Formby Residents Action Group	Labour	
2021	8	48	8	0	2 Formby Residents Action Group	Labour	
2022	7	48	8	1	2 Formby Residents Action Group	Labour	
2023	5	51	9	1	1 Lydiate, Maghull, Aintree, and Lunt Community Independent	Labour	
2024	4	49	9	2	1 Green Party 1 vacant seat	Labour	
2026	0	36	17	5	5 Reform UK, 3 Green Party	Labour	Whole council elected after boundary changes.

- ‡ Liberal Party before 1988.

== Results maps ==
2004 results map

2006 results map

2007 results map

2008 results map

2010 results map

2011 results map

2012 results map

2014 results map

2015 results map

2016 results map

2018 results map

2019 results map

2021 results map

2022 results map

2023 results map

2024 results map

2026 results map

== By-election results ==
=== 1994-1998 ===
Park By-Election 11 September 1997 (2)
Party	Candidate	Votes	%	±%
Liberal Democrats	Andrew Blackburn	1,079		
Liberal Democrats	Robbie Fenton	1,013		
Labour		497		
Labour		479		
Conservative		337		
Conservative		308		
Turnout		3,713	13.0	
Liberal Democrats hold		Swing		
Liberal Democrats hold		Swing		

Manor By-Election 3 October 1997
Party	Candidate	Votes	%	±%
Labour	Derek Langley	924	48.6	−7.8
Conservative		658	34.6	+2.5
Liberal Democrats		190	10.0	−1.4
Independent		128	6.7	+6.7
Majority		266	14.0	
Turnout		1,900	19.0	
Labour hold		Swing		

=== 1998-2002 ===
Ainsdale By-Election 3 February 2000
Party	Candidate	Votes	%	±%
Liberal Democrats		1,570	50.4	−1.4
Conservative		1,389	44.6	+8.5
Labour		158	5.1	−2.1
Majority		181	5.8	
Turnout		3,117	30.4	
Liberal Democrats hold		Swing		

Litherland By-Election 22 February 2001
Party	Candidate	Votes	%	±%
Labour	Darren Hardy	900	62.8	−11.3
Liberal Democrats	Jim Murray	472	33.0	+7.1
Socialist Alternative		60	4.2	+4.2
Majority		428	29.8	
Turnout		1,432	17.6	
Labour hold		Swing		

Manor By-Election 7 June 2001
Party	Candidate	Votes	%	±%
Labour	Neil Douglas	3,251	53.9	+11.9
Conservative		1,800	29.8	−11.1
Liberal Democrats		981	16.3	−0.8
Majority		1,451	24.1	
Turnout		6,032		
Labour gain from Conservative		Swing		

=== 2002-2006 ===
Church By-Election 2 March 2006
Party	Candidate	Votes	%	±%
Labour	Paul Cummins	806	52.4	+13.1
Liberal Democrats	Andrew Tonkiss	431	28.0	−22.8
BNP	Michael McDermott	159	10.3	+10.3
Conservative	Antonio Spatuzzi	143	9.3	−0.6
Majority		375	24.4	
Turnout		1,539	17.2	
Labour gain from Liberal Democrats		Swing		

=== 2006-2010 ===
Manor By-Election 25 October 2007
Party	Candidate	Votes	%	±%
Conservative	David McIvor	922	40.5	−7.6
Liberal Democrats	John Gibson	769	33.8	+13.4
Labour	Sue Hanley	419	18.4	−13.1
BNP	Michael McDermott	94	4.1	+4.1
UKIP	Peter Harper	71	3.1	+3.1
Majority		153	6.7	
Turnout		2,275	22.8	
Conservative gain from Labour		Swing		

=== 2010-2014 ===
Bootle Derby By-Election 7 November 2013
Party	Candidate	Votes	%	±%
Labour	Anne Thompson	903	65	
UKIP	Jack Colbert	293	21	
Independent	Juliet Edgar	97	7	
TUSC	Graham Woodhouse	48	3	
Independent	Janice Blanchard	29	2	
Green	Laurence Rankin	25	2	
Turnout		1,399	15.77	
Labour hold		Swing		

=== 2014-2018 ===
Dukes By-Election 2 November 2017
Party	Candidate	Votes	%	±%
Liberal Democrats	John Pugh	1,680	56	
Conservative	Ann Pearmain	790	26	
Labour	Frank Hanley	417	14	
UKIP	Terry Durance	69	2	
Green	Nick Senior	45	1	
Majority		890	30	
Turnout		3,001	28.5	
Liberal Democrats hold		Swing		

=== 2022-2026 ===
Linacre By-Election 24 November 2022
Party	Candidate	Votes	%	±%
Labour	Dan McKee	636	81.5	+5.3
Independent	Ian Smith	144	18.5	+18.5
Majority		492	63.0	
Turnout		780		
Labour hold		Swing		

Netherton and Orrell By-Election 16 February 2023
Party	Candidate	Votes	%	±%
Labour	Tom Spring	1,001	82.5	+9.7
Conservative	Katie Burgess	119	9.8	+2.4
Independent	Champian (Ian Smith)	94	7.7	+7.7
Majority		882	72.7	
Turnout		1,214		
Labour hold		Swing		

A by-election in St. Oswald ward was held on 20 June 2024 following the death of Labour Councillor Paula Spencer, which had left the seat vacant during the year's local election period. The statement of persons nominated was released on 24 May 2024.

St Oswald By-Election 20 June 2024
Party	Candidate	Votes	%	±%
Labour	Helen Duerden	828	78.2	−0.4
Conservative	Katie Burgess	67	6.3	+0.1
TUSC	Conor O'Neill	57	5.4	−2.5
Green	Lyndsey Doolin	55	5.2	−2.2
Liberal Democrats	Paul Young	32	3.0	N/A
Workers Party	Ian Smith	20	1.9	N/A
Majority		761	71.9	
Registered electors		8,081		
Turnout		1,059	13.12	
Rejected ballots		1	0.1	
Labour hold		Swing	▼0.25	

A by-election in Linacre was held on 4 July 2024 following the resignation of Labour councillor John Fairclough, the same day as the 2024 UK general election. The statement of persons nominated was released on 10 June 2024.

Linacre By-Election 4 July 2024
Party	Candidate	Votes	%	±%
Labour	Jim Conalty	2,850	81.2	−4.3
Workers Party	Ian Smith	460	13.1	New
Conservative	Katie Burgess	200	5.7	−0.6
Majority		3,310	68.1	−9.2
Turnout		3,510	38.8	+20.7
Rejected ballots		76		
Labour hold		Swing	▼8.7	

Litherland By-Election 21 November 2024
Party	Candidate	Votes	%	±%
Labour	Julia Garner	495	43.7	−30.3
Green	Jack Colbert	385	34.0	+27.1
Reform	Darcy Iveson-Berkeley	141	12.4	+12.4
Conservative	Katie Burgess	48	4.2	−0.6
Workers Party	Ian Smith	40	3.5	+3.5
TUSC	Conor O'Neill	25	2.2	+2.2
Majority		110	9.7	
Turnout		1,134		
Labour hold		Swing		

Blundellsands By-Election 19 June 2025
Party	Candidate	Votes	%	±%
Labour	David Roscoe	1,190	43.8	−24.5
Green	Kieran Dams	420	15.5	+7.3
Reform	Irene Davidson	386	14.2	New
Liberal Democrats	Keith Cawdron	370	13.6	+6.8
Conservative	Martyn Barber	287	10.6	−6.1
TUSC	Conor O'Neill	35	1.3	New
Independent	Ian Smith	27	1.0	New
Majority		770	28.3	
Turnout		2,720	29.99	
Rejected ballots		5	0.2	
Labour hold		Swing		
