= Ainsdale (ward) =

Electoral ward of Sefton, Merseyside, England

Coordinates: 53.6021°N 3.0405°W

Ainsdale is a Metropolitan Borough of Sefton ward in the Southport Parliamentary constituency that covers the localities of Ainsdale and Woodvale in the town of Southport. At the 2011 census it had a population of 12,102.

== Councillors ==
indicates seat up for re-election.

Election	Councillor	Councillor	Councillor
2004	Michael Ridge (Con)	Peter Brough (Con)	Brenda Porter (Con)
2006	Mark Bigley (Con)	Peter Brough (Con)	Brenda Porter (Con)
2007	Mark Bigley (Con)	Terry Jones (Con)	Brenda Porter (Con)
2008	Mark Bigley (Con)	Terry Jones (Con)	Brenda Porter (Con)
2010	Haydn Preece (LD)	Terry Jones (Con)	Brenda Porter (Con)
2011	Haydn Preece (LD)	Terry Jones (Con)	Brenda Porter (Con)
2012	Haydn Preece (LD)	Terry Jones (Con)	Ted Hartill (Con)
2014	Haydn Preece (LD)	Terry Jones (Con)	Ted Hartill (Con)
2015	Haydn Preece (LD)	Terry Jones (Con)	Ted Hartill (Con)
2016	Haydn Preece (LD)	Terry Jones (Con)	Lynne Thompson (LD)
2018	Tony Brough (Con)	Terry Jones (Con)	Lynne Thompson (LD)
2019	Tony Brough (Con)	Terry Jones (Con)	Lynne Thompson (LD)
2021	Tony Brough (Con)	Terry Jones (Con)	Lynne Thompson (LD)
2022	Tony Brough (Con)	Terry Jones (Con) (Note: Shortly after the 2022 local election Terry Jones left the Conservatives, remaining on the council as an independent councillor.)	Lynne Thompson (LD)
2023	Tony Brough (Con)	Janet Harrison (Lab)	Lynne Thompson (LD)
2024	Tony Brough (Con)	Janet Harrison (Lab)	Lynne Thompson (LD)

== Election results ==
=== Elections of the 2020s ===
Sefton Council Election 2024: Ainsdale
Party	Candidate	Votes	%	±%
Liberal Democrats	Lynne Thompson*	1,978	51.5	+16.3
Labour	Frank Hanley	1,193	31.0	−4.5
Conservative	Ryan Abbott	527	13.7	−11.1
Green	Laurence Rankin	145	3.8	−0.6
Rejected ballots		27		
Majority		785	21.4	+21.1
Turnout		3,843	38.2	
Registered electors		10,061		
Liberal Democrats hold		Swing	▲10.4	

Sefton Council Election 2023: Ainsdale
Party	Candidate	Votes	%	±%
Labour	Janet Harrison	1,497	35.5	+3.3
Liberal Democrats	Lesley Delves	1,481	35.2	+4.9
Conservative	Nigel Ball	1,046	24.8	−8.2
Green	Laurence Rankin	187	4.4	−0.1
Majority		16	0.3	
Turnout		4,211	42	
Labour gain from Independent		Swing	▲5.8	

Sefton Council Election 2022: Ainsdale
Party	Candidate	Votes	%	±%
Conservative	Tony Brough	1,387	33.0	+2.1
Labour	Janet Harrison	1,354	32.2	+12.8
Liberal Democrats	Lesley Delves	1,272	30.3	−14.2
Green	Laurence Rankin	189	4.5	−0.7
Majority		33	0.8	
Turnout		4,202	41.9	
Conservative hold		Swing	▼5.4	

Sefton Council Election 2021: Ainsdale
Party	Candidate	Votes	%	±%
Liberal Democrats	Lynne Thompson	1,807	44.53	▼2.93
Conservative	Michael Shaw	1,253	30.88	
Labour	Sean Flynn	789	19.44	
Green	Laurence Rankin	209	5.15	
Majority		554	13.65	
Turnout		4,053		
Liberal Democrats hold		Swing		

=== Elections of the 2010s ===
Sefton Council Election 2019: Ainsdale
Party	Candidate	Votes	%	±%
Conservative	Terry Jones	1,257	33.0	
Labour	Kevin Donnellon	944	25.0	
Liberal Democrats	Anne Leslie Corbishley	907	24.0	
UKIP	Derek Samuel Tasker	431	11	
Green	Barbara Ann Dutton	246	6	
Majority		313	8.0	
Turnout		3,785	37.1	
Conservative hold		Swing		

Sefton Council Election 2018: Ainsdale
Party	Candidate	Votes	%	±%
Conservative	Tony Brough	1,891	46.0	
Labour	Frank Hanley	1,084	26.0	
Liberal Democrats	Jude Storer	935	23.0	
Green	Barbara Ann Dutton	118	3	
UKIP	Peter Forder	95	2	
Majority		807	20.0	
Turnout		4,123	40.7	
Conservative hold		Swing		

Sefton Council Election 2016: Ainsdale
Party	Candidate	Votes	%	±%
Liberal Democrats	Lynne Thompson	1,713	41.6	+13.4
Conservative	Jamie Halsall	1,149	27.9	−4.1
Labour	Mhairi McLeod Johnstone Doyle	729	17.7	−1.3
UKIP	Duncan Browne	394	9.6	−7.0
Green	Barbara Ann Dutton	133	3.2	−0.9
Majority		564	13.7	+9.9
Turnout		4,118	42.6	−29.3
Liberal Democrats gain from Conservative		Swing	+8.8	

Sefton Council Election 2015: Ainsdale
Party	Candidate	Votes	%	±%
Conservative	Terry Jones	2,247	32.0	
Liberal Democrats	Lynne Thompson	1,978	28.2	
Labour	Lesley Delves	1,332	19.0	
UKIP	Terry Durrance	1,165	16.6	
Green	Barbara Ann Dutton	289	4.1	
Majority		269	3.8	
Turnout		7,011	71.9	
Conservative hold		Swing		

Sefton Metropolitan Borough Council Municipal Elections 2014: Ainsdale
Party	Candidate	Votes	%	±%
Liberal Democrats	Cllr Haydn Preece	1187	30%	
Conservative	Jamie Halsall	1159	29%	
UKIP	Terry Durrance	990	25%	
Labour	Stephen Jowett	444	11%	
Green	Barbara Ann Dutton	207	5%	
Majority				
Turnout		3987		
Liberal Democrats hold		Swing		

Sefton Metropolitan Borough Council Municipal Elections 2012: Ainsdale
Party	Candidate	Votes	%	±%
Conservative	Cllr Ted Hartill	2030	44%	
Liberal Democrats	Lynne Thompson	869	23%	
Labour	Stephen James Jowett	653	17%	
UKIP	Bryan Leech	624	17%	
Green	Barbara Ann Dutton	180	5%	
Majority				
Turnout		3772		
Conservative hold		Swing		

Sefton Metropolitan Borough Council Municipal Elections 2011: Ainsdale
Party	Candidate	Votes	%	±%
Conservative	Cllr Terry Jones	2030	44%	
Liberal Democrats	Lynne Thompson	1194	26%	
Labour	Stephen James Jowett	799	17%	
UKIP	Bryan Leech	318	7%	
Green	Lisa Morgan Clague	167	4%	
BNP	John Raymond Bankes	67	1%	
Majority				
Turnout		4575	47%	
Conservative hold		Swing		

Sefton Metropolitan Borough Council Municipal Elections 2010: Ainsdale
Party	Candidate	Votes	%	±%
Liberal Democrats	Haydn Clive Preece	2936	43%	
Conservative	Mark Bigley	2703	40%	
Labour	Stephen James Jowett	668	10%	
UKIP	John Bryan Leech	335	5%	
BNP	John Bankes	141	2%	
Majority				
Turnout		6783	71%	
Liberal Democrats gain from Conservative		Swing		
