= Dukes (ward) =

Electoral ward in Southport, England

Coordinates: 53°38′38.2″N 3°0′43.8″W

Dukes is a Metropolitan Borough of Sefton ward in the Southport Parliamentary constituency that covers the western part of the localities of Birkdale and Hillside in the town of Southport. The ward population taken at the 2011 census was 13,333.

== Councillors ==
indicates seat up for re-election. indicates by-election.

Election	Councillor	Councillor	Councillor
2004	Ronald Watson (Con)	Leslie Byrom (Con)	David Pearson (Con)
2006	Ronald Watson (Con)	Leslie Byrom (Con)	David Pearson (Con)
2007	Ronald Watson (Con)	Leslie Byrom (Con)	David Pearson (Con)
2008	Ronald Watson (Con)	Leslie Byrom (Con)	David Pearson (Con)
2010	Ronald Watson (Con)	Leslie Byrom (Con)	David Pearson (Con)
2011	Ronald Watson (Con)	Pat Ball (Con)	David Pearson (Con)
2012	Ronald Watson (Con)	Pat Ball (Con)	Tony Dawson (LD)
2014	David Barton (Con)	Pat Ball (Con)	Tony Dawson (LD)
2015	David Barton (Con)	Pat Ball (Con)	Tony Dawson (LD)
2016	David Barton (Con)	Pat Ball (Con)	Tony Dawson (LD)
2017 by-election	David Barton (Con)	John Pugh (LD)	Tony Dawson (Ind)
2018	Ron Watson (Con)	John Pugh (LD)	Tony Dawson (Ind)
2019	Ron Watson (Con)	John Pugh (LD)	Tony Dawson (Ind)
2021	Ron Watson (Con)	John Pugh (LD)	Mike Prendergast (Con)
2022	Ron Watson (Con)	John Pugh (LD)	Mike Prendergast (Con)
2023	Ron Watson (Con)	John Pugh (LD)	Mike Prendergast (Con)
2024	Ron Watson (Con)	John Pugh (LD)	Mike Prendergast (Con)
2026	Danny Howard (LD)	John Pugh (LD)	Michael Braham (LD)

== Election results ==
=== Elections of the 2020s ===
Sefton Metropolitan Borough Council Municipal Elections 2026: Dukes
Party	Candidate	Votes	%	±%
Liberal Democrats	John Pugh*	1,653		
Liberal Democrats	Michael Paul Braham	1,445		
Liberal Democrats	Danny Howard	1,343		
Conservative	Mike Prendergast*	1136		
Reform	Owen James Phillips	1047		
Conservative	Laura Nuttall	956		
Reform	Lorinda Smith	946		
Reform	Sarah Zhang	935		
Conservative	Benjamin Younis	759		
Green	David Newman	384		
Green	Kim Doyle	367		
Labour	Alexander Constantine	304		
Labour	Charlotte Megan Kelly	294		
Green	Ganesh Chandra Paul	287		
Labour	Patrick Sharman	255		
Rejected ballots		10		
Majority				
Turnout				
Registered electors		10,442		
Liberal Democrats win (new boundaries)				
Liberal Democrats win (new boundaries)				
Liberal Democrats win (new boundaries)				

Sefton Metropolitan Borough Council Municipal Elections 2024: Dukes
Party	Candidate	Votes	%	±%
Conservative	Mike Prendergast*	1,379	41.7	▼0.1
Liberal Democrats	Damian Bond	967	29.3	▲13.2
Labour	Helen Duerden	764	23.1	▲8.5
Green	David Newman	195	5.9	▲0.1
Rejected ballots		29		
Majority		412		
Turnout		3,305	31.7	
Registered electors		10,442		
Conservative hold		Swing	▼6.7	

Sefton Metropolitan Borough Council Municipal Elections 2023: Dukes
Party	Candidate	Votes	%	±%
Liberal Democrats	John Pugh*	1,496	42.1	▼7.1
Conservative	Laura Nuttall	1,214	34.2	▲11.5
Labour	Trevor Vaughan	676	19.0	▲4.5
Green	Alwynne Cartmell	165	4.6	▼0.9
Majority		282		
Registered electors		10,419		
Turnout		3,551	34	
Rejected ballots		9		
Liberal Democrats hold		Swing		

Sefton Metropolitan Borough Council Municipal Elections 2022: Dukes
Party	Candidate	Votes	%	±%
Conservative	Ron Watson*	1,479	41.9	+0.1
Liberal Democrats	Jo Barton	1,224	34.7	+18.6
Labour	Trevor Vaughan	824	23.4	+8.8
Majority		255	7.2	
Turnout		3,527	33.7	
Conservative hold		Swing	▼9.3	

Sefton Metropolitan Borough Council Municipal Elections 2021: Dukes
Party	Candidate	Votes	%	±%
Conservative	Mike Prendergast	1,576	41.8	
Independent	Tony Dawson	816	21.7	
Liberal Democrats	David Newman	606	16.1	
Labour	Thomas Spring	551	14.6	
Green	Robert Doyle	219	5.8	
Majority		760		
Turnout				
Conservative gain from Liberal Democrats		Swing		

=== Elections of the 2010s ===
Sefton Metropolitan Borough Council Municipal Elections 2019: Dukes
Party	Candidate	Votes	%	±%
Liberal Democrats	John Pugh	1,729	49.2	
Conservative	Adam Charles Edward Kennaugh	797	22.7	
Labour	Lesley Delves	511	14.5	
UKIP	Al Johnson	285	8.1	
Green	Robert Michael Doyle	194	5.5	
Majority		932		
Turnout		3,516	32.4	
Liberal Democrats hold		Swing		

Sefton Metropolitan Borough Council Municipal Elections 2018: Dukes
Party	Candidate	Votes	%	±%
Conservative	Sir Ron Watson	1,409	40.1	▲10.9
Liberal Democrats	Jo Barton	1275	36.3	▲10.9
Labour	Sahar Dehghani-Barenji	710	20.2	▲3.5
Green	Nick Senior	118	3.4	▼1.0
Majority		134	3.8	
Turnout		3512	32.7	
Conservative hold		Swing	▲10.9	

Sefton Metropolitan Borough Council Municipal By-Elections 2017: Dukes
Party	Candidate	Votes	%	±%
Liberal Democrats	John Pugh	1680	56.0	▲28.4
Conservative	Ann Blanche Pearmain	790	26.3	▼9.4
Labour	Frank Hanley	417	13.9	▼2.3
UKIP	Terry Durrance	69	2.3	▼13.5
Green	Nick Senior	45	1.5	▼3.1
Majority		890		
Turnout		3001		
Liberal Democrats gain from Conservative		Swing		

Sefton Metropolitan Borough Council Municipal Elections 2011: Dukes
Party	Candidate	Votes	%	±%
Conservative	Pat Ball	1475	38%	
Liberal Democrats	Tony Dawson	1152	30%	
Labour	Catherine Emily Cookson	581	15%	
Independent	Harry Forster	376	10%	
UKIP	John Charles Lyon-Taylor	296	8%	
Majority		323		
Turnout		3880		
Liberal Democrats hold		Swing		

Sefton Metropolitan Borough Council Municipal Elections 2010: Dukes
Party	Candidate	Votes	%	±%
Conservative	Ron Watson	2589	43%	
Liberal Democrats	Mary Joan Shavaksha	2137	35%	
Labour	Catherine Emily Cookson	687	11%	
Independent	Harry Forster	635	10%	
Majority				
Turnout		6048	62%	
Conservative hold		Swing		
