= Cambridge (Sefton ward) =

Electoral ward in Sefton, Merseyside, England

Coordinates: 53°39′44.3″N 2°58′18.2″W

Cambridge is an electoral ward in the Metropolitan Borough of Sefton in Merseyside, England. It is in the Southport Parliamentary constituency which covers the locality of Marshside in the town of Southport.

== Councillors ==
indicates seat up for re-election.

Election	Councillor	Councillor	Councillor
2004	Robert Price (Con)	Thomas Mann (Con)	Thomas Glover (Con)
2006	Susan McGuire (LD)	Thomas Mann (Con)	Thomas Glover (Con)
2007	Susan McGuire (LD)	Carmel Preston (LD)	Thomas Glover (Con)
2008	Susan McGuire (LD)	Carmel Preston (LD)	Thomas Glover (Con)
2010	Susan McGuire (LD)	Carmel Preston (LD)	Thomas Glover (Con)
2011	Susan McGuire (LD)	Tony Crabtree (Con)	Thomas Glover (Con)
2012	Susan McGuire (LD)	Tony Crabtree (Con)	Pat Keith (LD)
2014	Susan McGuire (LD)	Tony Crabtree (Con)	Pat Keith (LD)
2015	Susan McGuire (LD)	Harry Bliss (Con)	Pat Keith (LD)
2016	Susan McGuire (LD)	Harry Bliss (Con)	Pat Keith (LD)
2018	Mike Morris (Con)	Harry Bliss (Con)	Pat Keith (LD)
2019	Mike Morris (Con)	Leo Evans (LD)	Pat Keith (LD)
2021	Mike Morris (Con)	Leo Evans (LD)	Sinclair D'Albuquerque (Con)
2022	Mike Morris (Con)	Leo Evans (LD)	Sinclair D'Albuquerque (Con) (Note: Shortly after the 2022 local election Sinclair left the Conservatives, remaining on the council as an independent councillor.)
2023	Mike Morris (Con)	Leo Evans (LD)	Sinclair D'Albuquerque (Ind) (Note: Shortly after the 2023 local election, Sinclair joined the Liberal Democrats.)
2024	Mike Morris (Con)	Leo Evans (LD)	Mike Sammon (LD)
2026	Pat Keith (LD)	Leo Evans (LD)	Mike Sammon (LD)

== Election results ==
Sefton Metropolitan Borough Council Municipal Elections 2026: Cambridge
Party	Candidate	Votes	%	±%
Liberal Democrats	Leo Evans*	1,581		
Liberal Democrats	Mike Salmon*	1,510		
Liberal Democrats	Pat Keith	1,430		
Reform	Sinclair D'Albuquerque	1338		
Reform	Mike Morris*	1289		
Reform	Kev Hookham	1230		
Conservative	Caroline Prendergast	578		
Conservative	Gary Haran Doyle	564		
Conservative	Sam Constantine	530		
Labour	Helen Avis	409		
Green	Carla Jane Fox	375		
Green	Stephen William Hesketh	370		
Green	Caroline Michelle Longdon	366		
Labour	Nina Killen	354		
Labour	Lily Ritchie	330		
Southport Community Independents	John Boye	128		
Rejected ballots		3		
Majority				
Turnout				
Registered electors		9,716		
Liberal Democrats win (new boundaries)				
Liberal Democrats win (new boundaries)				
Liberal Democrats win (new boundaries)				

Sefton Metropolitan Borough Council Municipal Elections 2024: Cambridge
Party	Candidate	Votes	%	±%
Liberal Democrats	Mike Sammon	1,161	36.5	−6.2
Conservative	Gary Haran Doyle	1,002	31.5	−2.6
Labour	Callum Naylor	816	25.6	+6.5
Green	Stephen Hesketh	204	6.4	+2.3
Rejected ballots		28		
Majority		159		
Turnout		3,441	32.8	−2.7
Registered electors		9,716		
Liberal Democrats gain from Conservative		Swing	▼1.8	

Sefton Metropolitan Borough Council Municipal Elections 2023: Cambridge
Party	Candidate	Votes	%	±%
Liberal Democrats	Leo Evans*	1,468	42.7	+5.5
Conservative	Gary Haran Doyle	1,175	34.1	−3.8
Labour	Joanne Faulkner	658	19.1	−0.1
Green	Carla Fox	140	4.1	−1.5
Majority		293		
Registered electors		9,701		
Turnout		3,441	35	
Rejected ballots		28		
Liberal Democrats hold		Swing	▲4.65	

Sefton Metropolitan Borough Council Municipal Elections 2022: Cambridge
Party	Candidate	Votes	%	±%
Conservative	Mike Morris*	1,338	37.9	−3.7
Liberal Democrats	Michael Sammon	1,313	37.2	+1.7
Labour	Ian Upton	678	19.2	+2.2
Green	Carla Fox	197	5.6	−0.3
Majority		25	0.7	
Turnout		3,526	36.1	
Conservative hold		Swing	▼2.7	

Sefton Metropolitan Borough Council Municipal Elections 2021: Cambridge
Party	Candidate	Votes	%	±%
Conservative	Sinclair d'Albuquerque	1455	42	▲20
Liberal Democrats	Pat Keith	1244	36	▼11
Labour	Laura Lunn Bates	596	17	▲3
Green	Carla Fox	205	6	▲4
Majority		211	6	
Turnout		3500	34.7	
Conservative gain from Liberal Democrats		Swing	▲15.5	

Sefton Metropolitan Borough Council Municipal Elections 2019: Cambridge
Party	Candidate	Votes	%	±%
Liberal Democrats	Leo Francis Evans	1398	41	▲13
Conservative	Harry Bliss	962	28	▼3
UKIP	Terry Durrance	123	15	▼6
Labour	James Joseph Hansen	381	11	▼4
Green	Nicholas John Senior	154	5	▲1
Majority		436	13	
Turnout		3387	32.9	
Liberal Democrats gain from Conservative		Swing	▲8	

Sefton Metropolitan Borough Council Municipal Elections 2018: Cambridge
Party	Candidate	Votes	%	±%
Conservative	Mike Morris	1258	37	▲16
Liberal Democrats	Leo Evans	1192	35	▼5
Labour	Stephen Jowett	757	22	▲12
UKIP	Terry Durrance	123	4	▼22
Green	Carla Fox	110	3	
Majority		66	2	
Turnout		3440	33.6	
Conservative gain from Liberal Democrats		Swing	▲10.8	

Sefton Metropolitan Borough Council Municipal Elections 2016: Cambridge
Party	Candidate	Votes	%	±%
Liberal Democrats	Lauren Patricia Keith	1575	47	▲5
Conservative	Jordan Thomas Shandley	729	22	▲1
UKIP	Michael Skarratts	501	15	▼6
Labour	Stephen James Jowett	465	14	▼2
Green	David William Collins	72	2	
Majority		436	13	
Turnout		3342	35.5	
Liberal Democrats hold		Swing	▲2	

Sefton Metropolitan Borough Council Municipal Elections 2015: Cambridge
Party	Candidate	Votes	%	±%
Conservative	Harry Bliss	1897	31	▼1
Liberal Democrats	Yaso Sathiy	1734	28	▼4
UKIP	Ann Irene Ferguson	1302	21	▲14
Labour	Muriel Annie Langley	901	15	▼3
Green	David William Collins	259	4	
Majority		163		
Turnout		6093	63.8	
Conservative hold		Swing		

Sefton Metropolitan Borough Council Municipal Elections 2014: Cambridge
Party	Candidate	Votes	%	±%
Liberal Democrats	Sue McGuire	1477	40	▼8
UKIP	Gordon Ferguson	940	26	
Conservative	Luke Thompson	762	21	▼14
Labour	Muriel Langley	362	10	▲2
Green	John Volynchook	114	3	
Majority		537		
Turnout		3655	38.8	
Liberal Democrats hold		Swing		

Sefton Metropolitan Borough Council Municipal Elections 2012: Cambridge
Party	Candidate	Votes	%	±%
Liberal Democrats	Pat Keith	1459	42	
Conservative	Cath Regan	734	21	
UKIP	Gordon Alan Ferguson	720	21	
Labour	Muriel Annie Langley	566	16	
Majority		725		
Turnout		3479	36.9	
Conservative gain from Liberal Democrats		Swing		

Sefton Metropolitan Borough Council Municipal Elections 2011: Cambridge
Party	Candidate	Votes	%	±%
Conservative	Tony Crabtree	1339	32	
Liberal Democrats	Lauren Patricia Keith	1323	32	
Labour	Andy Dams	737	18	
Independent	Stuart Taylor	475	11	
UKIP	Allen Ferguson	277	7	
Majority				
Turnout		4151	43	
Conservative gain from Liberal Democrats		Swing		

Sefton Metropolitan Borough Council Municipal Elections 2010: Cambridge
Party	Candidate	Votes	%	±%
Liberal Democrats	Sue McGuire	2910	48	
Conservative	Jamie Philip Halsall	2167	35	
Labour	Muriel Annie Langley	515	8	
Independent	Jacqueline Anne Barlow	347	6	
BNP	Margaret McEllenborough	166	3	
Majority				
Turnout		6105	65	
Liberal Democrats hold		Swing		
