= Church (Sefton ward) =

Coordinates: 53°27′43.9″N 3°0′31.4″W

Church is a Metropolitan Borough of Sefton ward in the Bootle Parliamentary constituency that covers the localities of Seaforth and Waterloo. The population of the ward as taken at the 2011 census was 12,068.

== Councillors ==
indicates seat up for re-election. indicates by-election.

Election	Councillor	Councillor	Councillor
2004	James Murray (LD)	Cynthia Johnson (LD)	Pauline Kehoe (LD)
2006 by-election	James Murray (LD)	Cynthia Johnson (LD)	Paul Cummins (Lab)
2006	Daren Veidman (Lab)	Cynthia Johnson (LD)	Paul Cummins (Lab)
2007	Daren Veidman (Lab)	Veronica Webster (Lab)	Paul Cummins (Lab)
2008	Daren Veidman (Lab)	Veronica Webster (Lab)	Paul Cummins (Lab)
2010	Daren Veidman (Lab)	Veronica Webster (Lab)	Paul Cummins (Lab)
2011	Daren Veidman (Lab)	Veronica Webster (Lab)	Paul Cummins (Lab)
2012	Daren Veidman (Lab)	Veronica Webster (Lab)	Paul Cummins (Lab)
2014	Daren Veidman (Lab)	Veronica Webster (Lab)	Paul Cummins (Lab)
2015	Daren Veidman (Lab)	Veronica Webster (Lab)	Paul Cummins (Lab)
2016	Daren Veidman (Lab)	Veronica Webster (Lab)	Paul Cummins (Lab)
2018	Daren Veidman (Lab)	Veronica Webster (Lab)	Paul Cummins (Lab)
2019	Daren Veidman (Lab)	Veronica Webster (Lab)	Paul Cummins (Lab)
2021	Daren Veidman (Lab)	Veronica Webster (Lab)	Paul Cummins (Lab)
2022	Daren Veidman (Lab)	Veronica Webster (Lab)	Paul Cummins (Lab)
2023	Daren Veidman (Lab)	Veronica Webster (Lab)	Paul Cummins (Lab)
2024	Daren Veidman (Lab)	Veronica Webster (Lab)	Neil Doolin (Green)

== Election results ==
=== Elections of the 2020s ===
Sefton Metropolitan Borough Council Municipal Elections 2024: Church
Party	Candidate	Votes	%	±%
Green	Neil Anthony Doolin	1,412	50	▲10
Labour	Paul Cummins	1307	47	▼7
Conservative	Dorothy Amanda Brown	91	3	▼1
Majority		105	4	
Registered electors		9,091		
Rejected ballots		18		
Turnout		2,867		
Green gain from Labour		Swing	▲10.0	

Sefton Metropolitan Borough Council Municipal Elections 2023: Church
Party	Candidate	Votes	%	±%
Labour	Veronica Webster	1,459	54	▼10.5
Green	Neil Anthony Doolin	1,090	40	▲9.9
Conservative	John Graham Campbell	115	4	▼1.4
Freedom Alliance. Stop the Great Reset	John Bellis	59	2	
Majority		369	14	▼20.7
Registered electors		9,078		
Rejected ballots		11		
Turnout		2,723		
Labour hold		Swing	▼10.5	

Sefton Metropolitan Borough Council Municipal Elections 2022: Church
Party	Candidate	Votes	%	±%
Labour	Daren Veidman	1,850	64.5	▲0.8
Green	Neil Doolin	862	30.1	▲9.0
Conservative	John Campbell	155	5.4	▼5.9
Majority		988	34.7	▼8.0
Registered electors		9,157		
Rejected ballots		21		
Turnout		2,867		
Labour hold		Swing	▼4.1	

Sefton Metropolitan Borough Council Municipal Elections 2021: Church
Party	Candidate	Votes	%	±%
Labour	Paul Cummins	1,727	63.7	
Green	Mike Carter	571	21.1	
Conservative	Sean Dorgan	305	11.3	
Liberal Democrats	Zanna Ashton	107	3.9	
Majority		1,156		
Registered electors		9,423		
Rejected ballots		50		
Turnout				
Labour hold		Swing		

=== Elections of the 2010s ===
Sefton Metropolitan Borough Council Municipal Elections 2019: Church
Party	Candidate	Votes	%	±%
Labour	Veronica Webster	1,560	62.4	
Green	Mike Carter	550	22.0	
Liberal Democrats	Les Ashton	195	7.8	
Conservative	Lynne Margaret Bold	194	7.8	
Majority		1,010		
Registered electors		9,389		
Rejected ballots		42		
Turnout		2,499	27.1	
Labour hold		Swing		

Sefton Metropolitan Borough Council Municipal Elections 2018: Church
Party	Candidate	Votes	%	±%
Labour	Daren Veidman	2,018	76.9	▲18.7
Conservative	Anne Clegg	271	10.3	▼10.1
Green	Laurence Rankin	237	9.0	▼0.5
Liberal Democrats	Frances Eaton	99	3.8	▼0.9
Majority		1747	66.6	
Turnout		2625	28.3	
Labour hold		Swing	▲14.5	

Sefton Metropolitan Borough Council Municipal Elections 2016: Church
Party	Candidate	Votes	%	±%
Labour	Paul Cummins	1,868	71.9%	
Green	Mike Carter	447	17.2	
Conservative	Helen Barber	282	10.9	
Majority		1,421		
Turnout		2,597		
Labour hold		Swing		

Sefton Metropolitan Borough Council Municipal Elections 2015: Church
Party	Candidate	Votes	%	±%
Labour	Veronica Webster	3,785	65.0%	
Conservative	Helen Barber	627	10.8	
UKIP	Mike Kelly	574	9.9	
Green	Laurence Rankin	525	9.0	
Liberal Democrats	Nathan Roche	316	5.4	
Majority		3,158		
Turnout		5,827		
Labour hold		Swing		

Sefton Metropolitan Borough Council Municipal Elections 2014: Church
Party	Candidate	Votes	%	±%
Labour	Cllr Daren Veidman	1690	58%	
UKIP	Mike Kelly	593	20%	
Green	Laurence Rankin	277	10%	
Conservative	Paula Parry	207	7%	
Liberal Democrats	Hannah Gee	135	5%	
Majority				
Turnout		2902		
Labour hold		Swing		

Sefton Metropolitan Borough Council Municipal Elections 2011: Church
Party	Candidate	Votes	%	±%
Labour	Cllr Miss Veronica Webster	2413	73%	
Conservative	Paul Martyn Barber	506	15%	
Liberal Democrats	Peter Gill	259	8%	
BNP	Andrew Dennis Leary	130	4%	
Majority				
Turnout		3308	37%	
Labour hold		Swing		

Sefton Metropolitan Borough Council Municipal Elections 2010: Church
Party	Candidate	Votes	%	±%
Labour	Daren Veidman	3119	57%	
Liberal Democrats	Carol Tonkiss	1137	21%	
Conservative	Sarah Louise Jackson	642	12%	
UKIP	Joseph Nugent	327	6%	
BNP	Andrew Dennis Leary	222	4%	
Majority				
Turnout		5447	61%	
Labour hold		Swing		
