= Birkdale (ward) =

Ward in the Metropolitan Borough of Sefton

Coordinates: 53.6344°N 3.0298°W

Birkdale is a Metropolitan Borough of Sefton ward in the Southport Parliamentary constituency that covers the eastern part of the localities of Birkdale and Hillside in the town of Southport, England. The population as at the 2011 census was 13,161.

== Councillors ==
indicates seat up for re-election.

| Election | Councillor | Councillor | Councillor |
|---|---|---|---|
| 2004 | Iain Brodie-Browne (LD) | Simon Shaw (LD) | Richard Hands (LD) |
| 2006 | Iain Brodie-Browne (LD) | Simon Shaw (LD) | Richard Hands (LD) |
| 2007 | Iain Brodie-Browne (LD) | Simon Shaw (LD) | Richard Hands (LD) |
| 2008 | Iain Brodie-Browne (LD) | Simon Shaw (LD) | Richard Hands (LD) |
| 2010 | Iain Brodie-Browne (LD) | Simon Shaw (LD) | Richard Hands (LD) |
| 2011 | Iain Brodie-Browne (LD) | Simon Shaw (LD) | Richard Hands (LD) |
| 2012 | Iain Brodie-Browne (LD) | Simon Shaw (LD) | Richard Hands (LD) |
| 2014 | Iain Brodie-Browne (LD) | Simon Shaw (LD) | Richard Hands (LD) |
| 2015 | Iain Brodie-Browne (LD) | Simon Shaw (LD) | Richard Hands (LD) |
| 2016 | Iain Brodie-Browne (LD) | Simon Shaw (LD) | Richard Hands (LD) |
| 2018 | Iain Brodie-Browne (LD) | Simon Shaw (LD) | Richard Hands (LD) |
| 2019 | Iain Brodie-Browne (LD) | Simon Shaw (LD) | Richard Hands (LD) |
| 2021 | Iain Brodie-Browne (LD) | Simon Shaw (LD) | Sonya Kelly (Lab) |
| 2022 | Iain Brodie-Browne (LD) | Simon Shaw (LD) | Sonya Kelly (Lab) |
| 2023 | Iain Brodie-Browne (LD) | Simon Shaw (LD) | Sonya Kelly (Lab) |
| 2024 | Iain Brodie-Browne (LD) | Simon Shaw (LD) | Sonya Kelly (Lab) |

== Election results ==
=== Elections of the 2020s ===
Sefton Metropolitan Borough Council Municipal Elections 2024: Birkdale
| Party | Candidate | Votes | % | ±% |
|---|---|---|---|---|
| Labour | Sonya Kelly* | 1,435 | 41.6 | +3.3 |
| Liberal Democrats | Erin Harvey | 1,357 | 39.3 | −1.2 |
| Conservative | Sam Harris | 489 | 14.2 | −0.1 |
| Green | Jeff Bee | 168 | 4.9 | +1.2 |
| Rejected ballots | | 26 | | |
| Majority | | 78 | | |
| Turnout | | 3,449 | 34.4 | −1.0 |
| Registered electors | | 10,018 | | |
| Labour hold | | Swing | ▲2.3 | |

Sefton Metropolitan Borough Council Municipal Elections 2023: Birkdale
| Party | Candidate | Votes | % | ±% |
|---|---|---|---|---|
| Liberal Democrats | Simon Shaw* | 1,431 | 40.5 | −2.9 |
| Labour | Ged Wright | 1,356 | 38.3 | +7.1 |
| Conservative | Sam Harris | 504 | 14.3 | −5.6 |
| Green | David Collins | 134 | 3.7 | −1.7 |
| Reform | Andrew Lynn | 110 | 3.1 | New |
| Majority | | 75 | 2.1 | −10.1 |
| Registered electors | | 9,992 | | |
| Turnout | | 3,535 | 35 | |
| Rejected ballots | | 6 | | |
| Liberal Democrats hold | | Swing | ▼5.1 | |

Sefton Metropolitan Borough Council Municipal Elections 2022: Birkdale
| Party | Candidate | Votes | % | ±% |
|---|---|---|---|---|
| Liberal Democrats | Iain Brodie-Browne* | 1,518 | 43.4 | +14.1 |
| Labour | Daniel McKee | 1,093 | 31.2 | −1.5 |
| Conservative | Lee Durkin | 697 | 19.9 | −12.1 |
| Green | David Collins | 190 | 5.4 | −0.6 |
| Majority | | 425 | 12.2 | |
| Turnout | | 3,498 | 34.7 | |
| Liberal Democrats hold | | Swing | ▲7.8 | |

Sefton Metropolitan Borough Council Municipal Elections 2021: Birkdale
| Party | Candidate | Votes | % | ±% |
|---|---|---|---|---|
| Labour | Sonya Ann Kelly | 1,125 | 33 | |
| Conservative | Lee Anthony Durkin | 1,099 | 32 | |
| Liberal Democrats | Vic Foulds | 1,006 | 29 | |
| Green | Bernhard Frank | 207 | 6 | |
| Majority | | 26 | 1 | |
| Turnout | | 3,437 | 34 | |
| Labour gain from Liberal Democrats | | Swing | | |

=== Elections of the 2010s ===
Changes in vote share are since the seat was previously contested (i.e. 4 years prior), not since the previous local election.

Sefton Metropolitan Borough Council Municipal Elections 2019: Birkdale
| Party | Candidate | Votes | % | ±% |
|---|---|---|---|---|
| Liberal Democrats | Simon Shaw | 1,710 | 48 | +15 |
| Labour | Daniel John Burns | 900 | 25 | +5 |
| Conservative | Thomas Andrew de Freitas | 370 | 10 | −11 |
| UKIP | Linda Julia Ann Gunn-Russo | 311 | 9 | −12 |
| Green | David William Collins | 288 | 8 | +3 |
| Majority | | 810 | 23 | +11 |
| Turnout | | 3,579 | 35 | −32.2 |
| Liberal Democrats hold | | Swing | | |

Sefton Metropolitan Borough Council Municipal Elections 2018: Birkdale
| Party | Candidate | Votes | % | ±% |
|---|---|---|---|---|
| Liberal Democrats | Iain Brodie Browne | 1,249 | 38 | −3 |
| Labour | Daniel John Burns | 982 | 30 | +16 |
| Conservative | Jacky Bliss | 806 | 25 | +11 |
| UKIP | Derek Samuel Tasker | 101 | 3 | −11 |
| Green | David William Collins | 121 | 4 | +1 |
| Majority | | 267 | 8 | −7 |
| Turnout | | 3,259 | 31.8 | −5.4 |
| Liberal Democrats hold | | Swing | | |

Sefton Metropolitan Borough Council Municipal Elections 2016: Birkdale
| Party | Candidate | Votes | % | ±% |
|---|---|---|---|---|
| Liberal Democrats | Richard Ronald Hands | 1,443 | 46 | +7 |
| Labour | Ged Wright | 717 | 23 | +1 |
| UKIP | Linda Julia Ann Gunn-Russo | 439 | 14 | −8 |
| Conservative | John Charles Lyon-Taylor | 428 | 14 | −3 |
| Green | Bernhard Frank | 107 | 3 | New |
| Majority | | 726 | 23 | +6 |
| Turnout | | 3,134 | 32.4 | −0.1 |
| Liberal Democrats hold | | Swing | | |

Sefton Metropolitan Borough Council Municipal Elections 2015: Birkdale
| Party | Candidate | Votes | % | ±% |
|---|---|---|---|---|
| Liberal Democrats | Cllr Simon Shaw | 2216 | 33 | −1 |
| Conservative | Poppy Elise Jones | 1374 | 21 | −2 |
| UKIP | Allen Ferguson | 1360 | 21 | +8 |
| Labour | Ged Wright | 1351 | 20 | −1 |
| Green | Tony Young | 318 | 5 | New |
| Majority | | 842 | 12 | +1 |
| Turnout | | 6619 | 67.2 | +26.4 |
| Liberal Democrats hold | | Swing | | |

Sefton Metropolitan Borough Council Municipal Elections 2014: Birkdale
| Party | Candidate | Votes | % | ±% |
|---|---|---|---|---|
| Liberal Democrats | Cllr Iain Brodie - Browne | 1484 | 41 | −14 |
| UKIP | Tom McKenzie | 945 | 26 | +19 |
| Labour | Ged Wright | 521 | 14 | +7 |
| Conservative | Jamie Halsall | 489 | 14 | −11 |
| Green | Tony Young | 178 | 5 | New |
| Majority | | 539 | 15 | −15 |
| Turnout | | 3617 | 37.2 | −29.8 |
| Liberal Democrats hold | | Swing | | |

Sefton Metropolitan Borough Council Municipal Elections 2012: Birkdale
| Party | Candidate | Votes | % | ±% |
|---|---|---|---|---|
| Liberal Democrats | Cllr Richard Ronald Hands | 1225 | 39 | |
| UKIP | Terry John Durrance | 707 | 22 | |
| Labour | Ged Wright | 688 | 22 | |
| Conservative | Nigel David Clifford Ball | 555 | 17 | |
| Majority | | 518 | 17 | |
| Turnout | | 3175 | 32.5 | |
| Liberal Democrats hold | | Swing | | |

Sefton Metropolitan Borough Council Municipal Elections 2011: Birkdale
| Party | Candidate | Votes | % | ±% |
|---|---|---|---|---|
| Liberal Democrats | Cllr Simon Shaw | 1361 | 34 | |
| Conservative | Alastair James McNair | 934 | 23 | |
| Labour | Frank Michael Robinson | 830 | 21 | |
| UKIP | Terry John Durrance | 520 | 13 | |
| Independent | Denise Katherine Roney | 324 | 8 | |
| BNP | Robert Smith | 56 | 1 | |
| Majority | | 427 | 11 | |
| Turnout | | 4025 | 40.8 | |
| Liberal Democrats hold | | Swing | | |

Sefton Metropolitan Borough Council Municipal Elections 2010: Birkdale
| Party | Candidate | Votes | % | ±% |
|---|---|---|---|---|
| Liberal Democrats | Iain Brodie - Browne | 3626 | 55 | |
| Conservative | Cath Regan | 1626 | 25 | |
| Labour | Frank Michael Robinson | 466 | 7 | |
| UKIP | Terry John Durrance | 437 | 7 | |
| Independent | Jimmy Henney | 234 | 4 | |
| BNP | Jane Leary | 177 | 3 | |
| Majority | | 2000 | 30 | |
| Turnout | | 6389 | 67 | |
| Liberal Democrats hold | | Swing | | |
