= 2000 Sefton Metropolitan Borough Council election =

2000 UK local government election

Elections to Sefton Metropolitan Borough Council were held on 4 May 2000. The whole council was up for election with boundary changes since the last election in 1999 reducing the number of seats by three. The council stayed under no overall control.

== Election result ==
Sefton local election result 2000
Party	Seats	Gains	Losses	Net gain/loss	Seats %	Votes %	Votes	+/−
Liberal Democrats	25			+1	37.9			
Labour	22			-8	33.3			
Conservative	19			+4	28.8			
