= Ainsdale =

Village in Merseyside, England

Coordinates: 53.6021°N 3.0405°W

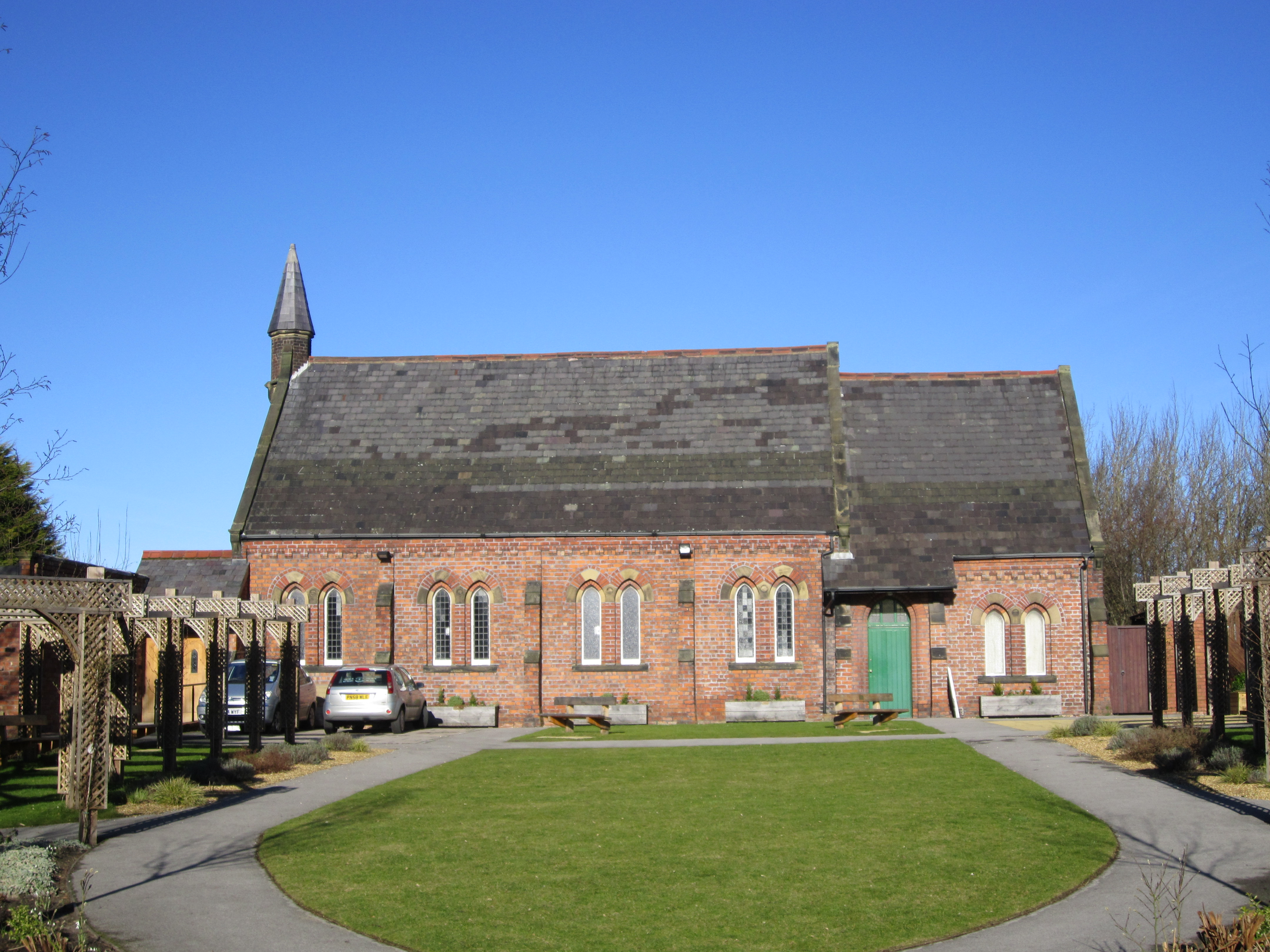
- Ainsdale Village Church

- Location in Southport Location within Merseyside
- Population: 12,723 (2001 Census)
- OS grid reference: SD312122
- Metropolitan borough: Sefton
- Metropolitan county: Merseyside
- Region: North West
- Country: England
- Sovereign state: United Kingdom
- Post town: SOUTHPORT
- Postcode district: PR8
- Dialling code: 01704
- Police: Merseyside
- Fire: Merseyside
- Ambulance: North West
- UK Parliament: Sefton Central

Ainsdale is a village in Southport, in the Sefton district, in Merseyside, England, situated three miles south of the centre of Southport. Originally in the historic county of Lancashire, at the 2001 Census it had a population of 12,723. By the time of the 2011 census, only figures for Ainsdale (ward) were available.

It makes up the southern edge of the town, separated from neighbouring Formby by RAF Woodvale. The village and roads leading to the beach are middle class areas, with some new modern developments around the station, including the addition of the private estate Village Row in 2006, and the Belway estate in 2013.

== History ==
=== Prior to 1600 ===
Ainsdale was listed in the Domesday Book as Einulvesdel. Deriving from Old Norse name Einulfsdalr, this apparently was the valley occupied by a Scandinavian by the name of Einulf.

=== 1600–present ===
Ainsdale formed part of Sir Cuthbert Halsall of Halsall's estates during the early part of the 1600s. After financial difficulties the land containing Ainsdale (then Aynsdale) had to be sold. In 1634 the ownership was passed to Robert Blundell. The lands were passed from generation to generation within the Blundell family and remained in their ownership until the mid-1900s.

Throughout the 1800s Ainsdale remained an agricultural community. Prior to the British Agricultural Revolution fields and farms in the locality were small and land was enclosed. The 1841 Census listed 176 inhabitants in 33 houses with occupations of farmer, agricultural labourers and servants.

Ainsdale railway station opened in 1848. A second station, on a different railway line, was opened in 1901. It was originally named Seaside, being renamed Ainsdale Beach in 1912. It closed in 1952. The route of the line it was on now forms the Coastal Road from Woodvale to Southport. The row of houses over the road from the Sands Hotel were originally railway staff cottages for that line.

In 1894 Ainsdale became a civil parish, being formed from part of Formby and became part of West Lancashire Rural District, in 1905 it became part of Birkdale Urban District, in 1912 it became part of the County Borough of Southport, on 1 April 1925 the parish was abolished and merged with Southport. In 1921 the parish had a population of 2942.

==== Land speed record ====
On 16 March 1926, Sir Henry Segrave set his first land speed record of 152.33 miles per hour (245.15 km/h) using Ladybird, a 4-litre Sunbeam Tiger on Ainsdale beach. This record was broken a month later by J.G. Parry-Thomas driving Babs, a custom-built car with a 27-litre 450 hp (340 kW) V12 Liberty aero engine.

== Governance ==
The area of Ainsdale, together with the adjoining settlement of Woodvale, and a significant part of Birkdale, forms a single electoral ward named Ainsdale, it is currently represented by three councillors on Sefton Council. As of May 2026, they are 3 Liberal Democrats, Lesley Delves, Rowenna Gibson and Lynne Thompson.

For parliamentary elections, the ward is part of the Sefton Central, currently represented by the Labour MP, Bill Esterson, who was elected at the 2010 United Kingdom general election when the seat was fought for the first time.

As part of constituency boundary changes effective at the 2024 United Kingdom general election, the town moved from the Southport constituency.

== Landmarks ==
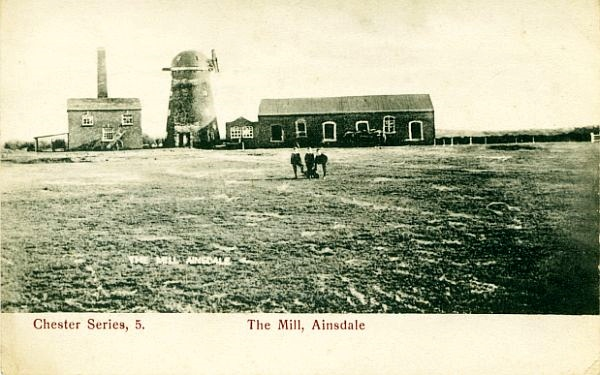
Tower Mill at Ainsdale

Ainsdale Mill, built circa 1800 on the site of an earlier wooden mill, was an impressive - and functional - landmark until its closure in 1965 and later demolition. A branch railway line from Ainsdale railway station served the corn mill during its operating years. The original Ainsdale timber post windmill served both Ainsdale and Birkdale and is mentioned in 1631 as being ‘in the possession of Cuthbert Rimmer’, in a lease from Robert Blundell.

Ainsdale boating lake, along with the beach itself, are popular tourist attractions, and thus Lakeside Hotel (now known as The Sands) was built to accommodate those wishing to stay in the area. However, a large campsite was also well populated in the busiest periods of the year.

In the village green there is a war memorial that commemorates the lives of forty-four Ainsdale residents killed as a result of the First World War.The War Memorial was totally refurbished by the Ainsdale Civic Society in 2012 when some missing names of those Ainsdale men killed in action in WW1 and extra plaques were inset on the Memorial to accommodate those lost from WW2 and Afghanistan. It took two years of research and fundraising to complete the second part of the project to restore the monument to its former glory. Space has been left on the memorial for additional names; however, they hope it never needs to be filled.

== Transport ==
The locality is served by Ainsdale railway station, which is situated on the Northern Line of the Merseyrail network, linking Southport to Liverpool. Trains operate every 15 minutes in each direction from early morning to late evening from Monday to Saturday and every 30 minutes on Sundays.

Frequent bus services passing through Ainsdale are provided by Arriva North West and Stagecoach.

== Recreation and sports ==
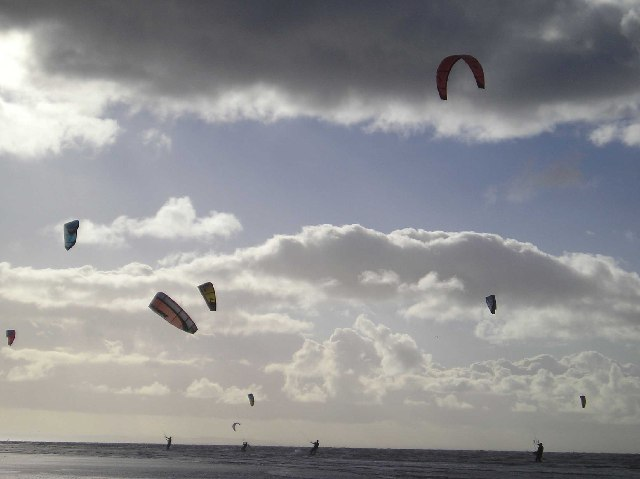
Kitesurfing at Ainsdale beach

Sport in Ainsdale is represented in various streams such as football, cricket, bowls, pool and chess. The village is also the home of the famous Southport and Ainsdale Golf Club.

The football section of Ainsdale Sports and Social Club namely Southport & Ainsdale Amateurs FC host teams from Under 6 up to Under 18 and Open Age Teams. The senior first team play in the Premier Division of the Mid Lancashire League. Ainsdale Cricket Club play in the successful Liverpool Competition. The club also has three All weather 3G pitches as part of its setup.

Ainsdale is also home to Hillside Lawn Tennis Club who play in the Southport Tennis League.

Every year at the start of July, Ainsdale Horticultural Society hold a village show. This popular local event showcases local growers produce in an horticultural competition and hosts many other events by local people.

Ainsdale beach is designated by Sefton Council as a kite beach where kitesurfing and land-based kite traction activities are allowed.

The Sefton coastal path, the Trans Pennine Trail and the King Charles III England Coast Path all pass through Ainsdale. A number of waymarked nature trails are also accessible from the town. These trails allow access to the Ainsdale Sand Dunes, designated as one of the national nature reserves in England. This nature reserve also comprises part of a Ramsar site.

The publisher Café Royal Books is based in the area.

== Notable people ==
- Sophie Abelson, actress
- John Menlove Edwards, rock climber
- Wilfred Pickles, actor and broadcaster
- Anthony Quayle, actor
