= 1998 Sefton Metropolitan Borough Council election =

1998 UK local government election

Elections to Sefton Metropolitan Borough Council, England were held on 7 May 1998. One third of the council was up for election and the council stayed under no overall control.

After the election, the composition of the council was

- Labour 31
- Liberal Democrat 23
- Conservative 14
- Independent 1

== Election result ==
Sefton local election result 1998
Party	Seats	Gains	Losses	Net gain/loss	Seats %	Votes %	Votes	+/−
Labour	10			0	41.7			
Liberal Democrats	8			-1	33.3			
Conservative	6			+1	25.0			
