= 1999 Sefton Metropolitan Borough Council election =

1999 UK local government election

Elections to Sefton Metropolitan Borough Council were held on 6 May 1999. One third of the council was up for election and the council stayed under no overall control.

After the election, the composition of the council was

- Labour 30
- Liberal Democrat 24
- Conservative 15

== Election result ==
Sefton local election result 1999
Party	Seats	Gains	Losses	Net gain/loss	Seats %	Votes %	Votes	+/−
Labour	9			-1	39.1			
Liberal Democrats	9			+1	39.1			
Conservative	5			+1	21.7			
Others	0			-1	0			
