= 2003 Sefton Metropolitan Borough Council election =

2003 UK local government election

Elections to Sefton Metropolitan Borough Council were held on 1 May 2003. One third of the council was up for election and the council stayed under no overall control.

After the election, the composition of the council was:

- Labour 24
- Liberal Democrat 20
- Conservative 19
- Southport Party 3

== Election result ==
Sefton local election result 2003
Party	Seats	Gains	Losses	Net gain/loss	Seats %	Votes %	Votes	+/−
Liberal Democrats	9			-1	39.1	32.0	19,162	+5.9%
Labour	7			-1	30.4	30.4	18,183	-8.7%
Conservative	7			+2	30.4	26.7	16,005	+1.6%
Southport Party	0			0	0	9.1	5,470	-2.2%
Socialist Alternative	0			0	0	1.3	790	+0.1%
BNP	0			0	0	0.4	226	+0.2%

== Ward results ==
Ainsdale
Party	Candidate	Votes	%	±%
Conservative	Brenda Porter	2,274	61.3	+14.9
Liberal Democrats	Carol Brookfield	705	19.0	−6.3
Southport Party	John Lee	523	14.1	−7.8
Labour	Linda Cluskey	210	5.7	+0.8
Majority		1,569	42.3	+21.4
Turnout		3,712	36.5	

Birkdale
Party	Candidate	Votes	%	±%
Liberal Democrats	Richard Hands	1,460	49.5	
Conservative	Janet Rowell	691	23.4	
Southport Party	John Law	636	21.6	
Labour	Christopher Holmes	164	5.6	
Majority		769	26.1	
Turnout		2,951	31.9	

Blundellsands
Party	Candidate	Votes	%	±%
Conservative	Paula Parry	1,777	60.1	+9.2
Labour	Jaine Fleetwood	732	24.8	−8.8
Liberal Democrats	William Brereton	446	15.1	−0.4
Majority		1,045	35.3	+18.0
Turnout		2,955	31.7	

Cambridge
Party	Candidate	Votes	%	±%
Conservative	Thomas Mann	1,331	41.6	+5.2
Southport Party	Terry Durrance	1,005	31.4	−5.3
Liberal Democrats	Clive Dally	631	19.7	−0.3
Labour	Paul Larkin	236	7.4	+0.4
Majority		326	10.2	
Turnout		3,203	32.0	

Church
Party	Candidate	Votes	%	±%
Liberal Democrats	Pauline Kehoe	1,372	49.6	+3.2
Labour	Paul Cummins	1,233	44.6	−2.5
Conservative	James Patterson	161	5.8	−0.7
Majority		139	5.0	
Turnout		2,766	29.7	

Derby
Party	Candidate	Votes	%	±%
Labour	Nicholas Fanning	1,210	78.3	+0.4
Liberal Democrats	Dennis Cross	335	21.7	+10.9
Majority		875	56.6	−9.9
Turnout		1,545	17.6	

Dukes
Party	Candidate	Votes	%	±%
Conservative	David Pearson	1,416	47.1	+7.0
Southport Party	Brian Birch	770	25.6	−5.7
Liberal Democrats	William Hibbard	614	20.4	+1.4
Labour	Phillip Walsh	208	6.9	+0.0
Majority		646	21.5	+12.7
Turnout		3,008	30.6	

Ford
Party	Candidate	Votes	%	±%
Labour	Kevin Cluskey	1,435	78.2	−0.2
Liberal Democrats	Garry Fielding	400	21.8	+0.2
Majority		1,035	56.4	−0.4
Turnout		1,835	19.5	

Harington
Party	Candidate	Votes	%	±%
Conservative	Eric Storey	1,770	56.4	+2.0
Labour	Maurice Newton	753	24.0	−1.2
Liberal Democrats	Druscilla Haydon	614	19.6	−0.9
Majority		1,017	32.4	+3.2
Turnout		3,137	30.5	

Kew
Party	Candidate	Votes	%	±%
Liberal Democrats	Terence Francis	1,247	48.1	+19.9
Southport Party	Anthony Holland	789	30.4	−12.3
Conservative	John Lyon-Taylor	341	13.1	−2.7
Labour	Graham Brannan	217	8.4	−1.4
Majority		458	17.7	
Turnout		2,594	26.2	

Linacre
Party	Candidate	Votes	%	±%
Labour	Doreen Kerrigan	1,164	82.9	−0.2
Liberal Democrats	Richard Williams	240	17.1	+0.2
Majority		944	65.8	−0.4
Turnout		1,404	15.8	

Litherland
Party	Candidate	Votes	%	±%
Labour	Patricia Hardy	997	72.7	−7.4
Liberal Democrats	James Murray	256	18.7	−1.2
Socialist Alternative	Michael Brierley	118	8.6	+8.6
Majority		741	54.0	−6.2
Turnout		1,371	15.9	

Manor (2)
Party	Candidate	Votes	%	±%
Labour	Neil Douglas	1,339		
Conservative	Martyn Barber	1,218		
Conservative	Peter Papworth	1,193		
Labour	John Walker	1,178		
Liberal Democrats	Edward Firth	460		
Liberal Democrats	Sara Murray	380		
Turnout		5,768	31.8	

Meols
Party	Candidate	Votes	%	±%
Liberal Democrats	David Tattersall	1,330	38.8	+6.7
Conservative	Jamie Halsall	1,000	29.2	+0.0
Southport Party	Richard Chapman	936	27.3	−5.9
Labour	Constance McCarthy	158	4.6	−0.9
Majority		330	9.6	
Turnout		3,424	34.4	

Molyneux
Party	Candidate	Votes	%	±%
Liberal Democrats	Geoffrey Howe	1,313	45.2	+5.3
Labour	James Reardon	895	30.8	−6.0
Conservative	Thomas Ridley	698	24.0	+0.7
Majority		418	14.4	+11.3
Turnout		2,906	28.2	

Netherton and Orrell
Party	Candidate	Votes	%	±%
Labour	Ian Maher	1,077	54.7	−3.6
Socialist Alternative	Peter Glover	672	34.1	+2.3
Liberal Democrats	Hilary Cross	219	11.1	+1.2
Majority		405	20.6	−5.9
Turnout		1,968	20.9	

Norwood
Party	Candidate	Votes	%	±%
Liberal Democrats	Brian Rimmer	1,263	43.8	+10.0
Southport Party	Geoffrey Wright	811	28.1	−5.3
Conservative	Nigel Deans	292	10.1	−7.9
Labour	Stephen Jowett	291	10.1	−0.1
BNP	Michael McDermott	226	7.8	+3.2
Majority		452	15.7	+15.3
Turnout		2,883	27.1	

Park
Party	Candidate	Votes	%	±%
Liberal Democrats	James Byrne	1,938	79.1	+7.6
Labour	James McGinnity	511	20.9	−0.5
Majority		1,427	58.2	+8.1
Turnout		2,449	21.1	

Ravenmeols
Party	Candidate	Votes	%	±%
Conservative	Anne Ibbs	1,430	52.8	+2.2
Labour	Paul Flodman	883	32.6	−5.2
Liberal Democrats	David Walker	396	14.6	+3.1
Majority		547	20.2	+7.4
Turnout		2,709	28.1	

St Oswald
Party	Candidate	Votes	%	±%
Labour	Peter Dowd	1,672	83.0	−1.5
Liberal Democrats	Noel Cross	342	17.0	+1.5
Majority		1,330	66.0	−3.0
Turnout		2,014	19.4	

Sudell
Party	Candidate	Votes	%	±%
Liberal Democrats	Sylvia Mainey	1,788	71.5	+17.9
Labour	Daren Veidman	712	28.5	+3.8
Majority		1,076	43.0	+14.1
Turnout		2,500	22.9	

Victoria
Party	Candidate	Votes	%	±%
Liberal Democrats	Michael Hill	1,413	51.7	+11.7
Labour	Pamela Parry	908	33.2	−8.3
Conservative	Antonio Spatuzzi	413	15.1	−3.4
Majority		505	18.5	
Turnout		2,734	28.8	
