= John Pugh (Liberal Democrat politician) =

British politician (born 1948)

Cllr John Pugh
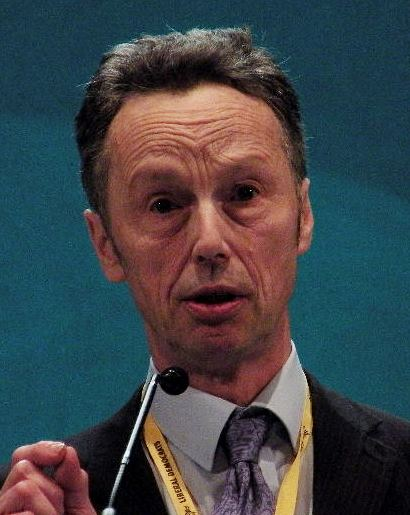
- Pugh in 2011

Liberal Democrat Education Spokesman
- In office 29 July 2015 – 8 May 2017
- Leader: Tim Farron
- Preceded by: David Laws
- Succeeded by: Sarah Olney

Member of Parliament for Southport
- In office 7 June 2001 – 3 May 2017
- Preceded by: Ronnie Fearn
- Succeeded by: Damien Moore

Member of Sefton Metropolitan Borough Council for Dukes
- Incumbent
- Assumed office 2 November 2017
- Preceded by: Pat Ball
- Majority: 890 (29.7%)

Personal details
- Born: 28 June 1948 (age 78) Liverpool, Lancashire, England
- Party: Liberal Democrats
- Spouse: Annette Pugh
- Children: 3 daughters, 1 son
- Education: St Cuthbert's Society, Durham
- Website: Official website

Academic background
- Thesis: The logical & philosophical ideas of Bernard Bosanquet (1995)

John David Pugh (born 28 June 1948) is a British Liberal Democrat politician. He was the Member of Parliament for Southport from 2001 to 2017. He stood down at the 2017 snap election. In November 2017, he was elected to Sefton Metropolitan Borough Council as a councillor for Duke's Ward.

== Early life and career ==
Pugh was educated at Prescot Grammar School and Maidstone Grammar School. He graduated from Durham University, attending St Cuthbert's Society, where he studied Philosophy.

Formerly a religious studies teacher and Head of Philosophy and Religious Studies at Merchant Taylors' Boys' School, Crosby, Pugh has lived in Southport since 1974. He also taught at Salesian College (later Savio High School) in Bootle.

Pugh joined the Liberal Party in 1977. Pugh served on Sefton Metropolitan Borough Council, representing Birkdale, from 1987 until his election to Parliament. Pugh became leader of the Sefton Liberal Democrats in 1992, and later also became leader of the council, which post he held until his election to parliament in 2001.

== Parliamentary career ==
First elected to the House of Commons in the 2001 general election, in his first parliamentary term, Pugh served on the Transport, Local Government and Regions Select Committee and was Liberal Democrat education spokesperson with responsibility for schools. Following his re-election to Parliament in 2005, he served as shadow spokesperson for Transport and Health, and, subsequent to the election of Nick Clegg as party leader worked with Vince Cable as Shadow Treasury spokesperson. In the 2007 leadership election, Pugh supported Clegg in preference to Chris Huhne.

With the formation of the coalition government in 2010 he was appointed as Co-Chair of the Liberal Democrat Parliamentary Committee for Health and Social Care, a position he relinquished at the end of 2013 to focus on producing a report examining the social and economic issues facing the North.

In his party's 2015 leadership election, John Pugh supported Tim Farron in preference to Norman Lamb.

In December 2015, Pugh voted to extend the bombing of ISIL targets in Iraq to Syria.

On 19 April 2017, Pugh announced that he would not be standing in the 2017 general election.

=== Campaign interests ===
Amongst Pugh's campaigning interests was public sector IT, specifically around the role Open Source Software might play. Pugh has argued that the public sector could reduce costs by increasing use of Open Source Software and has accused the BBC of effectively giving Microsoft illegal state aid in only making their iPlayer download service available on Windows computers (at the time).

Pugh has interests in mental health policy. In October 2009, Pugh introduced a private members' bill under the 10-minute rule calling for more local control over the NHS.

Locally in Southport, Pugh was interested in saving local pubs, and also in the drinking culture of the UK. Pugh saw cheap alcohol deals in supermarkets as one of the major problems causing pub closures, and fuelling the culture. He also took the fight for Local Post Offices to 10 Downing Street.

In Transport, Pugh had long campaigned for the reinstatement of the Burscough Curves, and worked with local groups such as the Ormskirk, Preston and Southport Travellers' Association (OPSTA) and the Southport Rail Transport Forum (SRTF) to save services from Southport to Manchester Piccadilly

Pugh supports Amnesty International, with whom he is reported to have had close ties with the Formby & Southport Group over a number of years.

In 2013, he became one of only four Liberal Democrat MPs to vote against the Marriage (Same Sex Couples) Bill.

== Personal life ==
He is married to Annette with three daughters and a son. He moved to Southport in 1974.

Pugh's interests include philosophy, computers, weight-lifting and supporting Liverpool F.C.

=== Roles in parliament ===
- 2010– Co-Chair of the Liberal Democrat Parliamentary Committee for Health and Social Care
- 2008–10 Shadow Treasury Spokesperson
- 2006–07 Shadow Health spokesperson
- 2005–06 Shadow Transport spokesperson,
- 2002–05 Shadow Ministerial Spokesman, Education

Parliament of the United Kingdom
Preceded by Ronnie Fearn	Member of Parliament for Southport; 2001–2017	Succeeded by Damien Moore
