= St. Oswald (ward) =

Electoral ward in Sefton, England

Coordinates: 53.48980°N 2.97201°W

St. Oswald is a Metropolitan Borough of Sefton ward in the Bootle Parliamentary constituency that covers the northern part of the locality of Netherton. The population of this ward taken at the 2011 census was 11,849.

== Councillors ==
Term	Councillor	Party
1973–Present	James Mahon	Labour Party
1983–Present	Mark Dowd	Labour Party
1991–Present	Peter Dowd	Labour Party
2016–Present	Carla Thomas	Labour Party

== Election results ==
=== Elections of 2015 ===
Sefton Metropolitan Borough Council Municipal Elections 2011: St. Oswald
Party	Candidate	Votes	%	±%
Labour	Paula Spencer	4412	86%	
Conservative	Nigel Stuart Barber	200	7%	
Liberal Democrats	Graham Bourne Farrell	94	3%	
Majority				
Turnout		2699	32%	
Labour hold		Swing		

Sefton Metropolitan Borough Council Municipal Elections 2010: St. Oswald
Party	Candidate	Votes	%	±%
Labour	Peter Dowd	3596	75%	
Liberal Democrats	Paul Michael Crossey	529	11%	
Conservative	Helen Louise Barber	332	7%	
UKIP	Bob Thompson	332	7%	
Majority				
Turnout		4789	56%	
Labour hold		Swing		
