= 2024 Sefton Metropolitan Borough Council election =

Local election in Merseyside, England

2024 Sefton Metropolitan Borough Council
- 2 May 2024

22 out of 66 seats to Sefton Metropolitan Borough Council 34 seats needed for a majority
- Turnout: 61,801, 28.9%

	First party	Second party	Third party
Leader	Marion Atkinson	John Pugh	Mike Prendergast
Party	Labour	Liberal Democrats	Conservative
Leader's seat	Molyneux	Dukes	Dukes
Last election	51 seats, 52.9%	9 seats, 16.4%	5 seats, 16.3%
Seats before	48	9	5
Seats after	49	9	4
Seat change	▲1	Steady	▼1
Popular vote	33,385	10,332	9,098
Percentage	54.0%	16.7%	14.7%
Swing	▲1.1 pp	▲0.3 pp	▼1.6 pp
	Fourth party	Fifth party	Sixth party
Leader	Neil Doolin	N/A	N/A
Party	Green	Independent	Lydiate and Maghull Community Independents
Leader's seat	Church	N/A	N/A
Last election	0 seat, 6.8%	1 seat, 2.3%	1 seat, 2.5%
Seats before	0	2	1
Seats after	1	2	0
Seat change	▲1	Steady	▼1
Popular vote	5,445	272	1,245
Percentage	8.8%	0.4%	2.0%
Swing	▲2.0 pp	▼1.9 pp	▼0.5 pp
- Winner of each seat at the 2024 Sefton Metropolitan Borough Council election
Leader before election
Marion Atkinson
Labour
Leader after election
Marion Atkinson
Labour

The 2024 Sefton Metropolitan Borough Council election took place on 2 May 2024 to elect members of Sefton Metropolitan Borough Council in Merseyside, England. This was on the same day as other local elections across England, Liverpool's City Region mayoral election and Merseyside's Police and Crime Commissioner election.

As is typical for Sefton's local elections, twenty-two seats of the sixty-six total were contested. The Labour Party have controlled the council since the 2012 elections, and prior to the election had a comfortable working majority of 13. Shortly before the election, this was reduced from their majority of 18 they had had following the previous year's election; in early March Labour Councillor Trish Hardy resigned from her Litherland ward seat leaving a vacancy, and less than a month before polling day Councillors Natasha Carlin and Sean Halsall left Labour in protest of the party's policy direction and stance on the war in Gaza.

The majority of the seats contested were held by Labour, who defended fifteen of the twenty-two seats. The Liberal Democrats defended three seats, and the Conservatives defended two seats. The then-vacant Litherland seat was also contested alongside two seats held by independent councillors.

Labour and the Conservatives contested all seats up for election, while the Green Party contested every seat except 1 (Linacre). As a result of administrative confusion some of the Green Party candidates had the description “Green Party” and the party's logo (16 candidates) next to their name on the voting ballots while others only had the logo (5 candidates). Additionally the Liberal Democrats contested close to all seats, with candidates representing Reform UK, TUSC, Freedom Alliance, localist groups, also stood a small number of candidates alongside 2 independents.

Labour retained their majority on the council. Amongst other results, the Green Party gained their first seat ever on the council, narrowly winning in Church ward by just over a hundred votes. One seat remained vacant following the election due to the death of Paula Spencer in March. This was filled in a by-election in June.

== Council composition ==
After 2023 election		Before 2024 election		After 2024 election	
Party	Seats	Party	Seats	Party	Seats
Labour	51	Labour	48	Labour	49
Liberal Democrats	9	Liberal Democrats	9	Liberal Democrats	9
Conservative	5	Conservative	5	Conservative	4
Green	0	Green	0	Green	1
Independent	0	Independent	2	Independent	2
Lydiate and Maghull Community Independents	1	Lydiate and Maghull Community Independents	1	Lydiate and Maghull Community Independents	0
Vacant	0	Vacant	2	Vacant	1

Changes:

- 7 March 2024: Labour councillor Trish Hardy resigns; seat filled at the 2024 election
- 27 March 2025: Paula Spencer dies; seat filled at a by-election in June 2024
- 8 April 2024: Natasha Carlin and Sean Halsall leave Labour to sit as independents

== Election results ==
Sefton Council's composition following the 2024 election. The vacancy was filled by Labour at a by-election in June.

2024 Sefton Metropolitan Borough Council election
Party	This election			Full council			This election		
Party	Seats	Net	Seats %	Other	Total	Total %	Votes	Votes %	+/−
Labour	17	▲1	77.3	32	49	74.2	33,385	54.0	+1.1
Liberal Democrats	3	Steady	13.6	6	9	13.6	10,332	16.7	+0.3
Conservative	1	▼1	4.5	3	4	6.1	9,098	14.7	-1.6
Independent	0	Steady	0.0	2	2	3.0	272	0.4	-1.9
Green	1	▲1	4.5	0	1	1.5	5,445	8.8	+2.0
Formby Residents Action Group	0	Steady	0.0	0	0	0.0	1,292	2.1	+0.6
Lydiate and Maghull Community Independents	0	▼1	0.0	0	0	0.0	1,245	2.0	-0.5
TUSC	0	Steady	0.0	0	0	0.0	232	0.4	±0.0
Reform	0	Steady	0.0	0	0	0.0	122	0.2	±0.0
Freedom Alliance	0	Steady	0.0	0	0	0.0	120	0.2	-0.5

== Ward results ==
The Statements of Persons Nominated, which details the candidates standing in each ward, were released by Sefton Council on 8 April 2024 following the close of nominations. Councillors that were standing for re-election are marked with an asterisk (*). The results for each ward were announced the day after the election.

=== Ainsdale ===
Ainsdale
Party	Candidate	Votes	%	±%
Liberal Democrats	Lynne Thompson*	1,978	51.5	+16.3
Labour	Frank Hanley	1,193	31.0	−4.5
Conservative	Ryan Abbott	527	13.7	−11.1
Green	Laurence Rankin	145	3.8	−0.6
Rejected ballots		27		
Majority		785	21.4	+21.1
Turnout		3,843	38.2	
Registered electors		10,061		
Liberal Democrats hold		Swing	▲10.4	

=== Birkdale ===
Birkdale
Party	Candidate	Votes	%	±%
Labour	Sonya Kelly*	1,435	41.6	+3.3
Liberal Democrats	Erin Harvey	1,357	39.3	−1.2
Conservative	Sam Harris	489	14.2	−0.1
Green	Jeff Bee	168	4.9	+1.2
Rejected ballots		26		
Majority		78		
Turnout		3,449	34.4	−1.0
Registered electors		10,018		
Labour hold		Swing	▲2.3	

=== Blundellsands ===
Blundellsands
Party	Candidate	Votes	%	±%
Labour	Diane Roscoe*	2,249	68.3	+1.4
Conservative	Katie Burgess	548	16.7	−1.9
Green	Kieran Dams	270	8.2	+1.1
Liberal Democrats	Brian Dunning	224	6.8	−0.6
Rejected ballots		25		
Majority		1,701	51.6	
Turnout		3,291	35.9	
Registered electors		9,159		
Labour hold		Swing	▲1.7	

=== Cambridge ===
Cambridge
Party	Candidate	Votes	%	±%
Liberal Democrats	Mike Sammon	1,161	36.5	−6.2
Conservative	Gary Haran Doyle	1,002	31.5	−2.6
Labour	Callum Naylor	816	25.6	+6.5
Green	Stephen Hesketh	204	6.4	+2.3
Rejected ballots		28		
Majority		159		
Turnout		3,441	32.8	−2.7
Registered electors		9,716		
Liberal Democrats gain from Conservative		Swing	▼1.8	

The incumbent councillor, Sinclair D’Albuquerque, joined the Liberal Democrats in 2023.

=== Church ===
Church
Party	Candidate	Votes	%	±%
Green	Neil Doolin	1,412	50.6	+10.6
Labour Co-op	Paul Cummins*	1,307	46.5	−7.1
Conservative	Dorothy Brown	91	3.2	−1.0
Rejected ballots		18		
Majority		105		
Turnout		2,810	30.9	+0.9
Registered electors		9,091		
Green gain from Labour		Swing	▲8.9	

=== Derby ===
Derby
Party	Candidate	Votes	%	±%
Labour	Maria Porter	1,580	78.9	−2.0
Reform	Leighton Sealeaf	122	6.1	New
Green	Kate Robinson	114	5.7	−1.6
Conservative	Iain Beckett	91	4.5	−2.3
TUSC	Dean Young	55	2.7	−2.3
Liberal Democrats	Rowenna Gibson	41	2.0	New
Rejected ballots		20		
Majority		1,458		
Turnout		2,003	22.3	
Registered electors		9,002		
Labour hold		Swing	▼4.1	

=== Dukes ===
Dukes
Party	Candidate	Votes	%	±%
Conservative	Mike Prendergast*	1,379	41.7	+7.5
Liberal Democrats	Damian Bond	967	29.3	−12.8
Labour	Helen Duerden	764	23.1	+4.1
Green	David Newman	195	5.9	+1.3
Rejected ballots		29		
Majority		412		
Turnout		3,305	31.7	
Registered electors		10,442		
Conservative hold		Swing	▲10.2	

=== Ford ===
Ford
Party	Candidate	Votes	%	±%
Labour	Paulette Lappin*	1,541	80.9	+0.1
Green	Lyndsey Doolin	187	9.8	−0.3
Conservative	Michael Shaw	120	6.3	Steady
Liberal Democrats	Adarsh Makdani	56	2.9	+0.2
Rejected ballots		17		
Majority		1,354	71.8	
Turnout		1,904	20.6	
Registered electors				
Labour hold		Swing	▲0.2	

=== Harington ===
Harington
Party	Candidate	Votes	%	±%
Labour	Karen Cavanagh	1,613	45.7	−7.4
Conservative	Joe Riley*	978	25.7	+0.1
Formby Residents Action Group	Dave Irving	551	15.6	−10.0
Green	Michael Walsh	244	6.9	+2.2
Liberal Democrats	Annie Gorski	142	4.0	−2.8
Rejected ballots		17		
Majority		635		
Turnout		3,528	36.4	
Registered electors		9,689		
Labour gain from Conservative		Swing	▲3.8	

=== Kew ===
Kew
Party	Candidate	Votes	%	±%
Labour	Jen Corcoran*	1,358	43.8	−8.7
Liberal Democrats	Daniel Lewis	1,118	36.1	+15.7
Conservative	Owen Phillips	440	14.2	−5.3
Green	Rob Wesley	184	5.9	−1.6
Rejected ballots		33		
Majority		240		
Turnout		3,100	28.9	+0.1
Registered electors		10,720		
Labour hold		Swing	▼12.2	

=== Linacre ===
Linacre
Party	Candidate	Votes	%	±%
Labour	Joanne Williams	1,402	85.5	+9.4
Liberal Democrats	David Mellalieu	134	8.2	New
Conservative	John Campbell	103	6.3	+0.4
Rejected ballots		26		
Majority		1268		
Turnout		1,639	18.1	
Registered electors		9,073		
Labour hold		Swing	▲0.6	

=== Litherland ===
Litherland
Party	Candidate	Votes	%	±%
Labour	Paula Murphy	1,526	74.0	−0.7
Independent	Ian Smith	249	12.1	−0.5
Green	Amber-Page Moss	142	6.9	−0.5
Conservative	Colin Appleton	99	4.8	−0.5
Liberal Democrats	Roy Connell	47	2.3	New
Rejected ballots		19		
Majority		1,277		
Turnout		2,063	22.8	
Registered electors		9,055		
Labour hold		Swing	▼0.1	

=== Manor ===
Manor
Party	Candidate	Votes	%	±%
Labour	Dominic McNabb	1,800	62.8	+3.0
Conservative	Martyn Barber	520	18.2	+0.4
Green	James O’Keeffe	311	10.9	+2.0
Liberal Democrats	John Gibson	233	8.1	−0.8
Rejected ballots		17		
Majority		1,280		
Turnout		2,864	29.1	
Registered electors		9,845		
Labour hold		Swing	▲1.3	

=== Meols ===
Meols
Party	Candidate	Votes	%	±%
Liberal Democrats	John Dodd*	1,452	46.3	+1.6
Labour	Steve Jowett	863	27.5	+4.0
Conservative	Bob Teesdale	613	19.5	−6.7
Green	Pauline Anne Hesketh	208	6.6	+1.0
Rejected ballots		21		
Majority		589		
Turnout		3,136	31.3	−2.7
Registered electors		10,016		
Liberal Democrats hold		Swing	▼1.2	

=== Molyneux ===
Molyneux
Party	Candidate	Votes	%	±%
Labour	Sam Hinde	2,063	75.0	+1.3
Conservative	Marcus Bleasdale	254	9.2	+1.1
Green	David Collins	220	8.0	New
Liberal Democrats	Paul Young	213	7.7	New
Rejected ballots		32		
Majority		1,809		
Turnout		2,750	27.0	
Registered electors		10,187		
Labour hold		Swing	▲0.1	

=== Netherton and Orrell ===
Netherton and Orrell
Party	Candidate	Votes	%	±%
Labour	Tom Spring*	1,637	77.9	+6.8
Green	Simon Baron	127	6.0	New
Freedom Alliance	Maria Walsh	120	5.7	−0.7
Conservative	Adam Marsden	113	5.4	−3.5
Liberal Democrats	Vic Foulds	55	2.6	New
TUSC	Owen Croft	50	2.4	New
Rejected ballots		12		
Majority		1,510		
Turnout		2,102	21.9	
Registered electors		9,616		
Labour hold		Swing	▲0.4	

=== Norwood ===
Norwood
Party	Candidate	Votes	%	±%
Labour	Dave Neary	1,487	55.3	−4.0
Conservative	Margaret Middleton	461	17.2	+1.5
Liberal Democrats	Lesley Delves	433	16.1	−2.6
Green	David McIntosh	306	11.4	+5.0
Rejected ballots		40		
Majority		1,026		
Turnout		2,687	26.3	−2.7
Registered electors		10,232		
Labour hold		Swing	▼2.8	

=== Park ===
Park
Party	Candidate	Votes	%	±%
Labour	Chloe Parker	1,621	58.1	+13.7
Lydiate and Maghull Community Independents	Paul McCord	641	23.0	−17.9
Conservative	Craig Titherington	274	9.8	−1.6
Green	Roy Greason	180	6.4	+2.5
Liberal Democrats	Keith Cawdron	76	2.7	Steady
Rejected ballots		14		
Majority		980		
Turnout		2,792	28.9	
Registered electors		9,646		
Labour hold		Swing	▲15.8	

=== Ravenmeols ===
Ravenmeols
Party	Candidate	Votes	%	±%
Labour	Catie Page*	1,759	56.8	+9.3
Formby Residents Action Group	Maria Bennett	741	23.9	−7.5
Conservative	Angelica Sadrieva	307	9.9	+0.1
Green	Alison Gibbon	201	6.5	+0.7
Liberal Democrats	Lisa Nicolson-Smith	89	2.9	−2.5
Rejected ballots		12		
Majority		1,018		
Turnout		3,097	31.6	
Registered electors		9,793		
Labour hold		Swing	▲8.4	

=== St. Oswald ===
St. Oswald
Party	Candidate	Votes	%	±%
Labour	Joe Johnson	1,270	78.6	−3.5
TUSC	Conor O’Neill	127	7.9	−1.2
Green	Rupert Shoebridge	119	7.4	New
Conservative	Henry Bliss	100	6.2	−2.9
Rejected ballots		11		
Majority		1,143		
Turnout		1,616	20.1	−0.4
Registered electors		8,028		
Labour hold		Swing	▼2.3	

=== Sudell ===
Sudell
Party	Candidate	Votes	%	±%
Labour	James Hansen*	1,715	58.9	+6.1
Lydiate and Maghull Community Independents	Joanne McCall	604	20.8	−15.4
Conservative	Daniel Kirk	336	11.5	+2.4
Green	Paul Dunbar	128	4.4	New
Liberal Democrats	James Tattersall	104	3.6	New
Independent	Marie Blease	23	0.8	New
Rejected ballots		15		
Majority		1,111		
Turnout		2,910	28.0	
Registered electors		10,383		
Labour hold		Swing		

=== Victoria ===
Victoria
Party	Candidate	Votes	%	±%
Labour	Michael Roche*	2,386	68.7	+7.3
Liberal Democrats	Hannah Gee	452	13.0	−7.2
Green	Samantha Cook	380	10.9	+1.0
Conservative	Paul Barber	253	7.3	−1.3
Rejected ballots		25		
Majority		1,934	55.7	
Turnout		3,471	33.0	
Registered electors		10,505		
Labour hold		Swing	▲7.25	

== Changes 2024-2026 ==
=== By-elections ===
==== Litherland ====
Litherland by-election: 21 November 2024
Party	Candidate	Votes	%	±%
Labour	Julia Garner	495	43.7	–30.3
Green	Jack Colbert	385	34.0	+27.1
Reform	Darcy Iveson-Berkeley	141	12.4	N/A
Conservative	Katie Burgess	48	4.2	–0.6
Workers Party	Ian Smith	40	3.5	N/A
TUSC	Conor O'Neill	25	2.2	N/A
Majority		110	9.7	–52.2
Turnout		1,135	12.4	–10.4
Registered electors		9,159		
Labour hold		Swing	▼28.7	

=== Blundellsands ===
Blundellsands by-election: 19 June 2025
Party	Candidate	Votes	%	±%
Labour	David Roscoe	1,190	43.8	–24.5
Green	Kieran Dams	420	15.5	+7.3
Reform	Irene Davidson	386	14.2	N/A
Liberal Democrats	Keith Cowdron	370	13.6	+6.8
Conservative	Martyn Barber	287	10.6	–6.1
TUSC	Conor O'Neill	35	1.3	N/A
Independent	Ian Smith	27	1.0	N/A
Majority		770	28.3	–23.3
Turnout		2,720	30.0	–5.9
Registered electors		9,071		
Labour hold		Swing	▼15.9	
