= 2010 Sefton Metropolitan Borough Council election =

2010 English local government election

Map of the 2010 Sefton Metropolitan Borough Council election

The 2010 Sefton Metropolitan Borough Council election took place on 6 May 2010 to elect a third of the members of Sefton Metropolitan Borough Council, the council of Sefton in England. This was on the same day as the other local elections as well as the 2010 United Kingdom general election. The previous council election took place in 2008 and the following election was held in 2011. In the election, the council stayed under no overall control with the Liberal Democrats as the largest party. The Liberal Democrats were particularly strong in the town of Southport whereas Labour was strongest in Knowsley.

== Results ==
Party	Previous	Seats +/-	2008
Liberal Democrat	28	Steady	28
Labour	21	▲2	23
Conservative	17	▼2	15

== See also ==
- Sefton Metropolitan Borough Council elections
