= 2004 Sefton Metropolitan Borough Council election =

2004 UK local government election

Results of the 2004 Sefton Metropolitan Borough Council election

Elections to Sefton Metropolitan Borough Council were held on 10 June 2004. The whole council was up for election with boundary changes since the last election in 2003. Overall turnout was 43.9%.

== Election result ==
Sefton local election result 2004
| Party | Seats | Gains | Losses | Net gain/loss | Seats % | Votes % | Votes | +/− |
|---|---|---|---|---|---|---|---|---|
| Liberal Democrats | 27 | | | +5 | 40.9 | 34.3 | 31,365 | +2.3% |
| Labour | 20 | | | -3 | 30.3 | 28.4 | 26,003 | -2.0% |
| Conservative | 19 | | | +1 | 28.8 | 28.2 | 25,807 | +1.5% |
| Southport Party | 0 | | | -3 | 0 | 7.2 | 6,568 | -1.9% |
| Socialist | 0 | | | 0 | 0 | 0.8 | 706 | -0.5% |
| UKIP | 0 | | | 0 | 0 | 0.6 | 507 | +0.6% |
| BNP | 0 | | | 0 | 0 | 0.5 | 417 | +0.1% |
| Communist | 0 | | | 0 | 0 | 0.1 | 120 | +0.1% |

== Ward results ==
Ainsdale (3)
| Party | Candidate | Votes | % | ±% |
|---|---|---|---|---|
| Conservative | Brenda Porter | 3,187 | | |
| Conservative | Peter Brough | 2,814 | | |
| Conservative | Michael Ridge | 2,403 | | |
| Liberal Democrats | Pauline Collier | 1,432 | | |
| Liberal Democrats | Bernard Blaney | 1,041 | | |
| Liberal Democrats | Clive Dally | 835 | | |
| Southport Party | Terry Durrance | 810 | | |
| Labour | Frank Warner | 556 | | |
| UKIP | John Leech | 507 | | |
| Turnout | | 13,585 | 53.7 | |

Birkdale (3)
| Party | Candidate | Votes | % | ±% |
|---|---|---|---|---|
| Liberal Democrats | Richard Hands | 2,080 | | |
| Liberal Democrats | Simon Shaw | 1,995 | | |
| Liberal Democrats | Iain Browne | 1,966 | | |
| Conservative | Janet Rowell | 1,014 | | |
| Conservative | Richard Beechey | 1,009 | | |
| Southport Party | Brian Birch | 917 | | |
| Southport Party | John Law | 863 | | |
| Conservative | Michael Swift | 814 | | |
| Labour | Frank Robinson | 495 | | |
| Turnout | | 11,153 | 45.3 | |

Blundellsands (3)
| Party | Candidate | Votes | % | ±% |
|---|---|---|---|---|
| Conservative | Paula Parry | 2,230 | | |
| Conservative | Wendy Jones | 2,204 | | |
| Conservative | Robert Roberts | 2,087 | | |
| Labour | Harry Wallace | 1,160 | | |
| Labour | Eileen McCauley | 1,159 | | |
| Labour | Harry Pepp | 1,110 | | |
| Liberal Democrats | Andrew Tonkiss | 770 | | |
| Liberal Democrats | Stephen Squire | 732 | | |
| Liberal Democrats | William Brereton | 688 | | |
| Turnout | | 12,140 | 50.1 | |

Cambridge (3)
| Party | Candidate | Votes | % | ±% |
|---|---|---|---|---|
| Conservative | Thomas Glover | 2,114 | | |
| Conservative | Thomas Mann | 2,036 | | |
| Conservative | Robert Price | 1,855 | | |
| Liberal Democrats | Susan McGuire | 1,579 | | |
| Liberal Democrats | Carol Brookfield | 1,502 | | |
| Liberal Democrats | Mark Roberts | 1,300 | | |
| Southport Party | David Cobham | 1,116 | | |
| Southport Party | James Naylor | 1,021 | | |
| Labour | Ian Bryden | 396 | | |
| Labour | John Seale | 388 | | |
| Turnout | | 13,307 | 53.5 | |

Church (3)
| Party | Candidate | Votes | % | ±% |
|---|---|---|---|---|
| Liberal Democrats | Pauline Kehoe | 1,785 | | |
| Liberal Democrats | Cynthia Johnson | 1,571 | | |
| Liberal Democrats | James Murray | 1,553 | | |
| Labour | Bob Waring | 1,383 | | |
| Labour | Carol Gustafson | 1,371 | | |
| Labour | Stan Morris | 1,345 | | |
| Conservative | Patrick Hignett | 347 | | |
| Conservative | Andrew Bird | 345 | | |
| Conservative | Margaret McCallum | 304 | | |
| Turnout | | 10,004 | 42.7 | |

Derby (3)
| Party | Candidate | Votes | % | ±% |
|---|---|---|---|---|
| Labour | John Rice | 1,993 | | |
| Labour | Paul Larkin | 1,811 | | |
| Labour | James McGinnity | 1,736 | | |
| Liberal Democrats | Hilary Cross | 498 | | |
| Liberal Democrats | Dennis Cross | 458 | | |
| Liberal Democrats | Noel Cross | 438 | | |
| Conservative | Kenneth Parry | 345 | | |
| Turnout | | 7,279 | 33.4 | |

Duke's (3)
| Party | Candidate | Votes | % | ±% |
|---|---|---|---|---|
| Conservative | David Pearson | 2,056 | | |
| Conservative | Leslie Byrom | 2,003 | | |
| Conservative | Ronald Watson | 1,974 | | |
| Liberal Democrats | William Hibbard | 1,003 | | |
| Liberal Democrats | Robert Hamilton | 978 | | |
| Liberal Democrats | Mary Shavaksha | 935 | | |
| Southport Party | John Shawcroft | 886 | | |
| Southport Party | Denise Smart | 835 | | |
| Labour | Catherine Cookson | 463 | | |
| Labour | Philip Walsh | 421 | | |
| Labour | Thomas Leek | 398 | | |
| Turnout | | 11,952 | 46.5 | |

Ford (3)
| Party | Candidate | Votes | % | ±% |
|---|---|---|---|---|
| Labour | Owen Brady | 2,168 | | |
| Labour | Kevin Cluskey | 2,065 | | |
| Labour | Ian Moncur | 1,891 | | |
| Liberal Democrats | Garry Fielding | 767 | | |
| Liberal Democrats | Margaret Davies | 524 | | |
| Liberal Democrats | Nicola Smith | 486 | | |
| Conservative | Jessamine Hounslea | 367 | | |
| Turnout | | 8,268 | 36.6 | |

Harington (3)
| Party | Candidate | Votes | % | ±% |
|---|---|---|---|---|
| Conservative | Alfred Doran | 2,800 | | |
| Conservative | Sydney Whitby | 2,661 | | |
| Conservative | Eric Storey | 2,656 | | |
| Liberal Democrats | Druscilla Haydon | 1,199 | | |
| Liberal Democrats | Colin Trollope | 1,147 | | |
| Labour | Thomas Bailey | 1,033 | | |
| Labour | Maurice Newton | 989 | | |
| Liberal Democrats | Winifred Maher | 813 | | |
| Labour | Linda Cluskey | 773 | | |
| Turnout | | 14,071 | 52.9 | |

Kew (3)
| Party | Candidate | Votes | % | ±% |
|---|---|---|---|---|
| Liberal Democrats | Maureen Fearn | 1,774 | | |
| Liberal Democrats | Terence Francis | 1,684 | | |
| Liberal Democrats | Frederick Weavers | 1,340 | | |
| Southport Party | Russell Watson | 948 | | |
| Southport Party | Anthony Holland | 918 | | |
| Southport Party | John Lee | 859 | | |
| Conservative | Marilyn Hunton | 612 | | |
| Conservative | David Woodfine | 603 | | |
| Conservative | John Lyon-Taylor | 584 | | |
| Labour | Graham Brannan | 379 | | |
| Labour | Eunice Slatcher | 291 | | |
| Turnout | | 9,992 | 42.3 | |

Linacre (3)
| Party | Candidate | Votes | % | ±% |
|---|---|---|---|---|
| Labour | Doreen Kerrigan | 1,646 | | |
| Labour | John Fairclough | 1,532 | | |
| Labour | Gordon Friel | 1,312 | | |
| Liberal Democrats | Richard Williams | 561 | | |
| Liberal Democrats | Matthew Wright | 416 | | |
| Liberal Democrats | Francisca Daver | 400 | | |
| Communist | John Byrne | 120 | | |
| Turnout | | 5,987 | 28.1 | |

Litherland (3)
| Party | Candidate | Votes | % | ±% |
|---|---|---|---|---|
| Labour | Patricia Hardy | 1,609 | | |
| Labour | Paul Tweed | 1,602 | | |
| Labour | Darren Hardy | 1,601 | | |
| Liberal Democrats | Mary Roberts | 614 | | |
| Liberal Democrats | Paul Crossey | 565 | | |
| Liberal Democrats | Caroline Croft | 450 | | |
| Conservative | Douglas Ward | 433 | | |
| Turnout | | 6,874 | 32.1 | |

Manor (3)
| Party | Candidate | Votes | % | ±% |
|---|---|---|---|---|
| Labour | Neil Douglas | 1,759 | | |
| Conservative | Martyn Barber | 1,728 | | |
| Labour | John Walker | 1,582 | | |
| Labour | Darren Veidman | 1,550 | | |
| Conservative | Peter Papworth | 1,540 | | |
| Conservative | Anthony West | 1,533 | | |
| Liberal Democrats | David Nolan | 1,038 | | |
| Liberal Democrats | Linda Gilroy | 876 | | |
| Liberal Democrats | Peter Hough | 814 | | |
| Turnout | | 12,420 | 46.3 | |

Meols (3)
| Party | Candidate | Votes | % | ±% |
|---|---|---|---|---|
| Liberal Democrats | John Dodd | 2,389 | | |
| Liberal Democrats | David Tattersall | 2,218 | | |
| Liberal Democrats | David Rimmer | 1,924 | | |
| Conservative | Jamie Halsall | 1,785 | | |
| Conservative | Colin Hughes | 1,419 | | |
| Conservative | Anthony White | 1,381 | | |
| Southport Party | Margaret Brown | 1,013 | | |
| Southport Party | Jack Diamond | 819 | | |
| Labour | Mary Stoker | 310 | | |
| Labour | Muriel Langley | 284 | | |
| Turnout | | 13,542 | 51.3 | |

Molyneux (3)
| Party | Candidate | Votes | % | ±% |
|---|---|---|---|---|
| Liberal Democrats | Geoffrey Howe | 2,100 | | |
| Liberal Democrats | Anthony Robertson | 1,996 | | |
| Liberal Democrats | John Colbert | 1,895 | | |
| Labour | Constance McCarthy | 980 | | |
| Labour | Susan Hanley | 978 | | |
| Labour | Christopher Holmes | 956 | | |
| Conservative | Alan Brown | 864 | | |
| Conservative | Thomas Lewis | 850 | | |
| Conservative | Philip Keane | 840 | | |
| Turnout | | 11,459 | 43.0 | |

Netherton and Orrell (3)
| Party | Candidate | Votes | % | ±% |
|---|---|---|---|---|
| Labour | Robert Brennan | 1,853 | | |
| Labour | David Martin | 1,757 | | |
| Labour | Ian Maher | 1,743 | | |
| Socialist | Peter Glover | 706 | | |
| Socialist | Marie Savin | 537 | | |
| Conservative | Hilary Bowden | 497 | | |
| Socialist | Michael Brierley | 485 | | |
| Turnout | | 7,578 | 37.3 | |

Norwood (3)
| Party | Candidate | Votes | % | ±% |
|---|---|---|---|---|
| Liberal Democrats | Ronald Fearn | 2,410 | | |
| Liberal Democrats | Brian Rimmer | 2,017 | | |
| Liberal Democrats | David Sumner | 1,915 | | |
| Southport Party | James Ford | 878 | | |
| Southport Party | George Halsall | 866 | | |
| Conservative | Pamela Gore | 580 | | |
| Conservative | Jean Smart | 566 | | |
| Conservative | David Haslehurst | 518 | | |
| BNP | Michael McDermott | 417 | | |
| Labour | Michael Nolan | 390 | | |
| Labour | Stephen Jowett | 339 | | |
| Turnout | | 10,896 | 43.2 | |

Park (3)
| Party | Candidate | Votes | % | ±% |
|---|---|---|---|---|
| Liberal Democrats | Robbie Fenton | 2,670 | | |
| Liberal Democrats | James Byrne | 2,632 | | |
| Liberal Democrats | Andrew Blackburn | 2,551 | | |
| Labour | Sandra Williams | 1,024 | | |
| Conservative | Christine Barber | 827 | | |
| Conservative | Nigel Barber | 819 | | |
| Turnout | | 10,523 | 45.5 | |

Ravenmeols (3)
| Party | Candidate | Votes | % | ±% |
|---|---|---|---|---|
| Conservative | Barry Griffiths | 2,315 | | |
| Conservative | Anne Ibbs | 2,160 | | |
| Conservative | Vincent Platt | 2,120 | | |
| Labour | Margaret Leyland | 1,452 | | |
| Labour | Paul Flodman | 1,355 | | |
| Labour | Andrew Smith | 1,048 | | |
| Liberal Democrats | David Walker | 835 | | |
| Liberal Democrats | Ian Milne | 833 | | |
| Liberal Democrats | Anne Harrison | 614 | | |
| Turnout | | 12,732 | 48.6 | |

St Oswald (3)
| Party | Candidate | Votes | % | ±% |
|---|---|---|---|---|
| Labour | James Mahon | 2,164 | | |
| Labour | Mark Dowd | 1,944 | | |
| Labour | Peter Dowd | 1,896 | | |
| Liberal Democrats | Johanna Blackburn | 582 | | |
| Liberal Democrats | Kathleen Jones | 543 | | |
| Liberal Democrats | Robert Jones | 515 | | |
| Turnout | | 7,644 | 34.4 | |

Sudell (3)
| Party | Candidate | Votes | % | ±% |
|---|---|---|---|---|
| Liberal Democrats | Clifford Mainey | 2,749 | | |
| Liberal Democrats | Sylvia Mainey | 2,619 | | |
| Liberal Democrats | Roy Connell | 2,037 | | |
| Labour | Stephen Kermode | 1,292 | | |
| Conservative | Paul Barber | 919 | | |
| Conservative | Jeannette Greaves-Smith | 908 | | |
| Conservative | Bradley Hankin | 892 | | |
| Turnout | | 11,416 | 46.4 | |

Victoria (3)
| Party | Candidate | Votes | % | ±% |
|---|---|---|---|---|
| Liberal Democrats | Michael Hill | 2,530 | | |
| Liberal Democrats | Edward Firth | 2,334 | | |
| Liberal Democrats | Sara Murray | 2,205 | | |
| Labour | Giles Blundell | 1,498 | | |
| Labour | Christopher Larkin | 1,209 | | |
| Labour | James Reardon | 1,178 | | |
| Conservative | Joseph Owens | 787 | | |
| Conservative | Yvonne Bennett de Rothschild | 765 | | |
| Conservative | Theresa Rossiter | 730 | | |
| Turnout | | 13,236 | 48.2 | |
