= 2023 Sefton Metropolitan Borough Council election =

Local election in Merseyside, England

- 4 May 2023

22 of 66 seats on Sefton Metropolitan Borough Council 34 seats needed for a majority

	First party	Second party	Third party
Leader	Ian Maher	John Pugh	Mike Prendergast
Party	Labour	Liberal Democrats	Conservative
Seats before	46	8	5
Seats after	51	9	5
	Fourth party	Fifth party
Leader	N/A
Party	Lydiate and Maghull Community Independents	Independent
Seats before	3	4 (Note: Of the four councillors prior to the election who did not belong to a registered political party, two formed the "Southport Councillors Group" led by Sinclair D'Albuquerque, and two formed the "Independent Group" led by David Irving.)
Seats after	1	0
- Winner of each seat at the 2023 Sefton Metropolitan Borough Council election
Leader before election
Ian Maher
Labour
Leader after election
Ian Maher
Labour

The 2023 Sefton Metropolitan Borough Council election was held on 4 May 2023 to elect members of Sefton Metropolitan Borough Council in England.

Labour retained and increased its majority on the council.

== Summary ==
=== Overview ===
The Labour Group gained 5 seats at the elections held on 4 May 2023 and the Liberal Democrat Group subsequently gained 1 seat as a result of Councillor Sinclair D'Albuquerque (Independent) joining them on 13 May 2003.

=== Election result ===
2023 Sefton Metropolitan Borough Council election
Party	This election			Full council			This election		
Party	Seats	Net	Seats %	Other	Total	Total %	Votes	Votes %	+/−
Labour	18	▲5	81.81	33	51	77.3	33,974	52.9	+3.6
Liberal Democrats	4	▲1	18.19	5	9	13.6	10,515	16.4	+1.2
Conservative	0	Steady	0.00	5	5	7.6	10,437	16.3	–3.9
Green	0	Steady	0.00	0	0	0.0	4,387	6.8	+2.1
FRAG	0	▼1	0.00	0	0	0.0	994	1.5	±0.0
Lydiate and Maghull Community Independents	0	▼1	0.00	0	0	0.0	1,608	2.5	N/A
Independent	0	▼3	0.00	1	1	1.5	1,472	2.3	–6.4
Freedom Alliance	0	Steady	0.00	0	0	0.0	461	0.7	N/A
TUSC	0	Steady	0.00	0	0	0.0	248	0.4	N/A
Reform	0	Steady	0.00	0	0	0.0	110	0.2	N/A

== Ward results ==
Candidates seeking re-election are marked with an asterisk (*)

=== Ainsdale ===
Ainsdale
Party	Candidate	Votes	%	±%
Labour	Janet Harrison	1,497	35.5	+3.3
Liberal Democrats	Lesley Delves	1,481	35.2	+4.9
Conservative	Nigel Ball	1,046	24.8	−8.2
Green	Laurence Rankin	187	4.4	−0.1
Majority		16	0.3	
Registered electors		9,973		
Turnout		4,211	42	
Rejected ballots		12		
Labour gain from Independent		Swing	▲5.8	

=== Birkdale ===
Birkdale
Party	Candidate	Votes	%	±%
Liberal Democrats	Simon Shaw*	1,431	40.5	−2.9
Labour	Ged Wright	1,356	38.3	+7.1
Conservative	Sam Harris	504	14.3	−5.6
Green	David Collins	134	3.7	−1.7
Reform	Andrew Lynn	110	3.1	New
Majority		75	2.1	−10.1
Registered electors		9,992		
Turnout		3,535	35	
Rejected ballots		6		
Liberal Democrats hold		Swing	▼5.1	

=== Blundellsands ===
Blundellsands
Party	Candidate	Votes	%	±%
Labour	Christine Howard*	2,390	66.9	+0.9
Conservative	Katie Burgess	663	18.6	−4.1
Liberal Democrats	Brian Dunning	266	7.4	−3.9
Green	Kieran Dams	254	7.1	New
Majority		1,727		
Registered electors		9,187		
Turnout		3,573	39	
Rejected ballots		22		
Labour hold		Swing		

=== Cambridge ===
Cambridge
Party	Candidate	Votes	%	±%
Liberal Democrats	Leo Evans*	1,468	42.7	+5.5
Conservative	Gary Haran Doyle	1,175	34.1	−3.8
Labour	Joanne Faulkner	658	19.1	−0.1
Green	Carla Fox	140	4.1	−1.5
Majority		293		
Registered electors		9,701		
Turnout		3,441	35	
Rejected ballots		28		
Liberal Democrats hold		Swing	▲4.65	

=== Church ===
Church
Party	Candidate	Votes	%	±%
Labour	Veronica Webster*	1,459	53.6	−10.9
Green	Neil Doolin	1,090	40.0	+9.9
Conservative	Graham Campbell	115	4.2	−1.2
Freedom Alliance	John Bellis	59	2.2	New
Majority		369		
Registered electors		9,078		
Turnout		2,723	30	
Rejected ballots		11		
Labour hold		Swing		

=== Derby ===
Derby
Party	Candidate	Votes	%	±%
Labour	Dave Robinson*	1,652	80.9	−4.1
Green	Kate Robinson	149	7.3	New
Conservative	Paul Barber	139	6.8	−0.8
TUSC	Dean Young	103	5.0	New
Majority		1,503		
Registered electors		8,984		
Turnout		2,043	23	
Rejected ballots		16		
Labour hold		Swing		

=== Dukes ===
Dukes
Party	Candidate	Votes	%	±%
Liberal Democrats	John Pugh*	1,496	42.1	+7.4
Conservative	Laura Nuttall	1,214	34.2	−7.7
Labour	Trevor Vaughan	676	19.0	−4.4
Green	Alwynne Cartmell	165	4.6	New
Majority		282		
Registered electors		10,419		
Turnout		3,551	34	
Rejected ballots		9		
Liberal Democrats hold		Swing		

=== Ford ===
Ford
Party	Candidate	Votes	%	±%
Labour	Ian Moncur*	1,638	80.8	+14.3
Green	Lyndsey Davies	205	10.1	New
Conservative	Harry Bliss	127	6.3	+1.1
Liberal Democrats	Adarsh Makdani	55	2.7	New
Majority		1,433		
Registered electors		9,244		
Turnout		2,025	22	
Rejected ballots		8		
Labour hold		Swing		

=== Harington ===
Harington
Party	Candidate	Votes	%	±%
Labour	Peter Harvey	1,485	38.3	−2.0
Formby Residents Action Group	Dave Irving*	994	25.6	+7.0
Conservative	Michael Shaw	953	24.6	−14.1
Liberal Democrats	Annie Gorski	263	6.8	+0.1
Green	Michael Walsh	181	4.7	−1.1
Majority		491		
Registered electors		9,693		
Turnout		3,876	40	
Rejected ballots		12		
Labour gain from Formby Residents Action Group		Swing		

=== Kew ===
Kew
Party	Candidate	Votes	%	±%
Labour	Sean Halsall*	1,599	52.5	+2.4
Liberal Democrats	Vic Foulds	622	20.4	−2.5
Conservative	Margaret Middleton	595	19.5	−7.5
Green	Will White	228	7.5	New
Majority		977		
Registered electors		10,568		
Turnout		3,044	29	
Rejected ballots		10		
Labour hold		Swing		

=== Linacre ===
Linacre
Party	Candidate	Votes	%	±%
Labour	John Fairclough*	1,166	76.1	−0.1
Green	Lily Davies	139	9.1	New
Independent	John Rice	138	9.0	New
Conservative	Anne Clegg	91	5.9	−0.7
Majority		1,027		
Registered electors		8,932		
Turnout		1,532	17	
Rejected ballots		8		
Labour hold		Swing		

=== Litherland ===
Litherland
Party	Candidate	Votes	%	±%
Labour	Paul Tweed*	1,556	74.7	−2.5
Independent	Ian Smith	262	12.6	New
Green	Graham Bentley	155	7.4	New
Conservative	Michael Crichton	110	5.3	−0.2
Majority		1,294		
Registered electors		8,908		
Turnout		2,083	23	
Rejected ballots		8		
Labour hold		Swing		

=== Manor ===
Manor
Party	Candidate	Votes	%	±%
Labour	Clare-Louise Carragher*	1,874	59.8	+0.7
Conservative	Jan Blanchard	559	17.8	−3.9
Liberal Democrats	John Gibson	335	10.7	−0.4
Green	James O'Keefe	280	8.9	+0.8
Freedom Alliance	Marie Harrison	84	2.7	New
Majority		1,315		
Registered electors		9,792		
Turnout		3,132	32	
Rejected ballots		8		
Labour hold		Swing		

=== Meols ===
Meols
Party	Candidate	Votes	%	±%
Liberal Democrats	Lauren Davidson	1,502	44.7	+7.7
Conservative	Bob Teesdale	879	26.2	−7.4
Labour	Stephen Jowett	791	23.5	+0.1
Green	Pauline Hesketh	189	5.6	−0.3
Majority		523		
Registered electors		9,899		
Turnout		3,361	34	
Rejected ballots		14		
Liberal Democrats hold		Swing		

=== Molyneux ===
Molyneux
Party	Candidate	Votes	%	±%
Labour	Marion Atkinson*	2,126	73.7	+13.4
Lydiate and Maghull Community Independents	Joanne McCall	400	13.9	New
Conservative	Morgan Walton	235	8.1	−0.6
Freedom Alliance	Carolyn Fitzgerald	124	4.3	New
Majority		1,726		
Registered electors		10,172		
Turnout		2,885	28	
Rejected ballots		24		
Labour hold		Swing		

=== Netherton and Orrell ===
Netherton and Orrell
Party	Candidate	Votes	%	±%
Labour	Sue Bradshaw*	1,767	84.7	+11.9
Conservative	Stephen Witham	186	8.9	+1.5
Freedom Alliance	Maria Walsh	133	6.4	New
Majority		1,581		
Registered electors		9,577		
Turnout		2,086	22	
Rejected ballots		12		
Labour hold		Swing		

=== Norwood ===
Norwood
Party	Candidate	Votes	%	±%
Labour	Greg Myers*	1,754	59.3	+3.4
Liberal Democrats	Jo Barton	552	18.7	+4.1
Conservative	Pam Teesdale	465	15.7	−6.0
Green	David Mcintosh	188	6.4	−1.5
Majority		1,203		
Registered electors		10,217		
Turnout		2,958	29	
Rejected ballots		15		
Labour hold		Swing		

=== Park ===
Park
Party	Candidate	Votes	%	±%
Labour Co-op	Mike Desmond	1,436	44.4	−0.7
Lydiate and Maghull Community Independents	John Sayers*	1,320	40.9	New
Conservative	Greg Titherington	264	8.2	−4.0
Green	Roy Greason	125	3.9	−3.4
Liberal Democrats	Keith Cawdron	86	2.7	New
Majority		116		
Registered electors		9,643		
Turnout		3,231	33.5	
Rejected ballots		17		
Labour gain from Lydiate and Maghull Community Independents		Swing		

=== Ravenmeols ===
Ravenmeols
Party	Candidate	Votes	%	±%
Labour	Chris Page	1,623	47.5	−5.0
Independent	Maria Bennett*	1,072	31.4	New
Conservative	Angelica Sadrieva	334	9.8	−9.8
Green	Alison Gibbon	199	5.8	−2.9
Liberal Democrats	Lisa Nicolson-Smith	186	5.4	New
Majority		551	16.1	
Turnout		3,414		
Registered electors		9,638		
Rejected ballots		13		
Labour gain from Independent		Swing		

=== St Oswald ===
St Oswald
Party	Candidate	Votes	%	±%
Labour	Paula Spencer*	1,362	82.1	
Conservative	Karl Starkey	151	9.1	New
TUSC	Conor O'Neill	145	8.7	New
Majority		1,211	73.0	
Turnout		1,658		
Registered electors		8,072		
Rejected ballots		8		
Labour hold		Swing		

=== Sudell ===
Sudell
Party	Candidate	Votes	%	±%
Labour Co-op	Phil Hart	1,761	52.8	+15.8
Lydiate and Maghull Community Independents	Patrick McKinley*	1,208	36.2	New
Conservative	Daniel Kirk	304	9.1	+1.2
Freedom Alliance	Marie Blease	61	1.8	New
Majority		553	16.6	
Turnout		3,334		
Registered electors		10,348		
Rejected ballots		13		
Labour hold		Swing		

=== Victoria ===
Victoria
Party	Candidate	Votes	%	±%
Labour	Leslie Byrom*	2,348	61.4	+1.1
Liberal Democrats	Hannah Gee	772	20.2	−6.8
Green	Samantha Cook	379	9.9	+4.2
Conservative	Andrew Burgess	328	8.6	+1.7
Majority		1,576	41.2	
Turnout		3,827		
Registered electors		10,498		
Rejected ballots		13		
Labour hold		Swing		
