= 2014 Sefton Metropolitan Borough Council election =

2014 UK local government election

Results of the 2014 Sefton Metropolitan Borough Council election

The 2014 Sefton Metropolitan Borough Council election took place on 22 May 2014 to elect one third of the council. It was held as part of the 2014 United Kingdom local elections.

== Ward results ==
Asterisk (*) denotes an incumbent seeking re-election.

Ainsdale
Party	Candidate	Votes	%	±%
Liberal Democrats	Cllr Haydn Preece	1187	30	
Conservative	Jamie Halsall *	1159	29	
UKIP	Terry Durrance	990	25	
Labour	Stephen Jowett	444	11	
Green	Barbara Ann Dutton	207	5	
Majority				
Turnout		3987		
Liberal Democrats gain from Conservative		Swing		

Church
Party	Candidate	Votes	%	±%
Labour	Cllr Daren Veidman	1690	58	
UKIP	Mike Kelly	593	20	
Green	Laurence Rankin	277	10	
Conservative	Paula Parry	207	7	
Liberal Democrats	Hannah Gee	135	5	
Majority				
Turnout		2902		
Labour hold		Swing		

Harington
Party	Candidate	Votes	%	±%
Conservative	Cllr Denise Dutton *	1652	43	
Labour	Tim Hale	1010	27	
UKIP	Dave Irving	720	19	
Green	Richard Willis	284	7	
Liberal Democrats	Winifred Maher	136	4	
Majority				
Turnout		3802		
Conservative hold		Swing		

Kew
Party	Candidate	Votes	%	±%
Liberal Democrats	Cllr Fred Weavers *	1094	34	
UKIP	Mike Lewtas	905	28	
Labour	Janet Harrison	600	19	
Conservative	Jordan Shandley	406	13	
Green	Dave McIntosh	183	6	
Majority				
Turnout		3188		
Liberal Democrats hold		Swing		

Norwood
Party	Candidate	Votes	%	±%
Liberal Democrats	Cllr Daniel Lewis *	1085	33	
UKIP	Jen Davies	739	23	
Labour	Lesley Delves	604	19	
Conservative	Graham Campbell	629	18	
Independent	Jacqueline Barlow	308	10	
Green	Neville Grundy	176	5	
Majority				
Turnout		3240	33	
Liberal Democrats hold		Swing		

Victoria
Party	Candidate	Votes	%	±%
Labour	Cllr Jan Grace	1691	45	
Liberal Democrats	Andrew Tonkiss *	849	22	
UKIP	Jack Colbert	669	18	
Conservative	Simon Jamieson	340	9	
Green	Julia Thorne	250	7	
Majority		842	23	
Turnout		3799	38	
Labour gain from Liberal Democrats		Swing		
