= 2006 Sefton Metropolitan Borough Council election =

2006 UK local government election

Results of the 2006 Sefton Metropolitan Borough Council election

Elections to Sefton Metropolitan Borough Council were held on 4 May 2006. One third of the council was up for election and the council stayed under no overall control.

After the election, the composition of the council was:

- Liberal Democrat 26
- Labour 21
- Conservative 19

== Election result ==
Sefton local election result 2006
Party	Seats	Gains	Losses	Net gain/loss	Seats %	Votes %	Votes	+/−
Liberal Democrats	10	1	1	0	43.5	35.7	24,029	+1.4%
Labour	7	1	1	0	30.4	24.9	16,775	-3.5%
Conservative	6	1	1	0	26.1	31.0	20,860	+2.8%
Southport Party	0	0	0	0	0	4.8	3,222	-2.4%
UKIP	0	0	0	0	0	1.4	945	+0.8%
Independent	0	0	0	0	0	0.9	572	+0.9%
Socialist Alternative	0	0	0	0	0	0.5	338	-0.3%
BNP	0	0	0	0	0	0.4	300	-0.1%
Green	0	0	0	0	0	0.4	242	+0.4%

== Ward results ==
Ainsdale
Party	Candidate	Votes	%	±%
Conservative	Mark Bigley	2,306	57.5	
Liberal Democrats	Bernard Blaney	984	24.6	
Southport Party	Stuart Elliott	289	7.2	
Labour	Frank Warner	236	5.9	
UKIP	John Leech	192	4.8	
Majority		1,322	32.9	
Turnout		4,007	40.8	−12.9
Conservative hold		Swing		

Birkdale
Party	Candidate	Votes	%	±%
Liberal Democrats	Iain Brodie-Brownie	1,681	49.0	
Conservative	Richard Beechey	994	29.0	
Southport Party	Terry Durrance	514	15.0	
Labour	Frank Robinson	239	7.0	
Majority		687	20.0	
Turnout		3,428	34.8	−10.5
Liberal Democrats hold		Swing		

Blundellsands
Party	Candidate	Votes	%	±%
Conservative	Robert Roberts	1,852	57.3	
Liberal Democrats	Mary Maxwell	726	22.4	
Labour	Constance McCarthy	656	20.3	
Majority		1,126	34.9	
Turnout		3,234	36.7	−13.4
Conservative hold		Swing		

Cambridge
Party	Candidate	Votes	%	±%
Liberal Democrats	Susan McGuire	1,692	42.4	
Conservative	Robert Price	1,470	36.8	
Southport Party	James Ford	630	15.8	
Labour	Muriel Langley	198	5.0	
Majority		222	5.6	
Turnout		3,990	41.9	−11.6
Liberal Democrats gain from Conservative		Swing		

Church
Party	Candidate	Votes	%	±%
Labour	Daren Veidman	1,028	41.2	
Liberal Democrats	Carol Tonkiss	612	24.5	
Independent	Philip Coppell	572	22.9	
Conservative	Antonio Spatuzzi	286	11.4	
Majority		416	16.7	
Turnout		2,498	27.8	−14.9
Labour gain from Liberal Democrats		Swing		

Derby
Party	Candidate	Votes	%	±%
Labour	James McGinnity	1,197	62.2	
UKIP	Paul Nuttall	403	21.0	
Liberal Democrats	Anne Harrison	205	10.7	
Conservative	Kenneth Parry	118	6.1	
Majority		794	41.2	
Turnout		1,923	20.9	−12.5
Labour hold		Swing		

Dukes
Party	Candidate	Votes	%	±%
Conservative	Ronald Watson	1,620	49.1	
Liberal Democrats	Robert Hamilton	885	26.8	
Southport Party	Harry Forster	531	16.1	
Labour	Catherine Cookson	263	8.0	
Majority		735	22.3	
Turnout		3,299	33.2	−13.3
Conservative hold		Swing		

Ford
Party	Candidate	Votes	%	±%
Labour	Ian Moncur	1,449	68.4	
Liberal Democrats	Nicola Smith	383	18.1	
Conservative	Jessamine Hounslea	286	13.5	
Majority		1,066	50.3	
Turnout		2,118	22.5	−14.1
Labour hold		Swing		

Harington
Party	Candidate	Votes	%	±%
Conservative	Eric Storey	2,223	61.4	
Liberal Democrats	Druscilla Haydon	804	22.2	
Labour	Maurice Newton	594	16.4	
Majority		1,419	39.2	
Turnout		3,621	37.1	−15.8
Conservative hold		Swing		

Kew
Party	Candidate	Votes	%	±%
Liberal Democrats	Frederick Weavers	1,346	47.3	
Conservative	Terence Jones	649	22.8	
Southport Party	John Lee	475	16.7	
Labour	Stephen Jowett	227	8.0	
UKIP	Valerie Pollard	149	5.2	
Majority		697	24.5	
Turnout		2,846	30.3	−12.0
Liberal Democrats hold		Swing		

Linacre
Party	Candidate	Votes	%	±%
Labour	Gordon Friel	1,130	71.4	
Liberal Democrats	John Gibson	453	28.6	
Majority		677	42.8	
Turnout		1,583	18.6	−9.5
Labour hold		Swing		

Litherland
Party	Candidate	Votes	%	±%
Labour	Darren Hardy	1,110	65.6	
Liberal Democrats	Ian Milne	321	19.0	
Conservative	Douglas Ward	260	15.4	
Majority		789	46.6	
Turnout		1,691	19.3	−12.8
Labour hold		Swing		

Manor
Party	Candidate	Votes	%	±%
Conservative	Debi Jones	1,795	49.8	
Labour	Caroline Hayes	1,266	35.1	
Liberal Democrats	David Nolan	547	15.2	
Majority		529	14.7	
Turnout		3,608	36.2	−10.1
Conservative gain from Labour		Swing		

Meols
Party	Candidate	Votes	%	±%
Liberal Democrats	David Rimmer	1,771	50.0	
Conservative	Michael Swift	1,103	31.1	
Southport Party	Margaret Brown	473	13.4	
Labour	Mary Stoker	194	5.5	
Majority		668	18.9	
Turnout		3,541	36.0	−15.3
Liberal Democrats hold		Swing		

Molyneux
Party	Candidate	Votes	%	±%
Liberal Democrats	Jack Colbert	1,665	56.3	
Labour	Susan Hanley	747	25.3	
Conservative	Peter Papworth	545	18.4	
Majority		918	31.0	
Turnout		2,957	29.2	−13.8
Liberal Democrats hold		Swing		

Netherton and Orrell
Party	Candidate	Votes	%	±%
Labour	Ian Maher	1,149	54.9	
Socialist Alternative	Peter Glover	338	16.2	
Liberal Democrats	Paul Crossey	253	12.1	
UKIP	Patricia Gaskell	201	9.6	
Conservative	Hilary Bowden	151	7.2	
Majority		811	38.7	
Turnout		2,092	23.0	−14.3
Labour hold		Swing		

Norwood
Party	Candidate	Votes	%	±%
Liberal Democrats	David Sumner	1,533	45.7	
Conservative	Phillip Rodwell	852	25.4	
Labour	Michael Nolan	358	10.7	
Southport Party	Richard Chapman	310	9.2	
BNP	Michael McDermott	300	8.9	
Majority		681	20.3	
Turnout		3,353	32.8	−10.4
Liberal Democrats hold		Swing		

Park
Party	Candidate	Votes	%	±%
Liberal Democrats	Andrew Blackburn	1,705	53.2	
Conservative	William McIvor	729	22.8	
Labour	Gwendolyn Kermode	526	16.4	
Green	Martin Owen	242	7.6	
Majority		976	30.4	
Turnout		3,202	32.5	−13.0
Liberal Democrats hold		Swing		

Ravenmeols
Party	Candidate	Votes	%	±%
Conservative	Vincent Platt	1,822	54.1	
Labour	Paul Flodman	907	26.9	
Liberal Democrats	Colin Trollope	639	19.0	
Majority		915	27.2	
Turnout		3,368	35.5	−13.1
Conservative hold		Swing		

St Oswald
Party	Candidate	Votes	%	±%
Labour	Peter Dowd	1,376	72.7	
Liberal Democrats	Linda Hough	518	27.3	
Majority		858	45.4	
Turnout		1,894	21.1	−13.3
Labour hold		Swing		

Sudell
Party	Candidate	Votes	%	±%
Liberal Democrats	Roy Connell	1,539	49.0	
Conservative	Josephine Healy	862	27.4	
Labour	Stephen Kermode	743	23.6	
Majority		677	11.6	
Turnout		3,144	31.0	−15.4
Liberal Democrats hold		Swing		

Victoria (2)
Party	Candidate	Votes	%	±%
Liberal Democrats	Andrew Tonkiss	2,049		
Liberal Democrats	Peter Hough	1,718		
Labour	Giles Blundell	1,182		
Conservative	Simon Jamieson	543		
Conservative	Anthony West	394		
Turnout		5,886		
Liberal Democrats hold		Swing		
