= 2015 Sefton Metropolitan Borough Council election =

2015 local election in England

- 7 May 2015

All council seats
	First party	Second party	Third party
Party	Labour	Liberal Democrats	Conservative
Seats won	42	16	7
Seat change	▲2	▼1	Steady
Popular vote	63,951	17,979	24,313
Percentage	46.6%	13.1%	17.7%
- Results of the 2015 Sefton Metropolitan Borough Council election
Leader of Largest Party before election
Labour
Subsequent Leader of Largest Party
Labour

The 2015 Sefton Metropolitan Borough Council election took place on 7 May 2015 to elect members of Sefton Metropolitan Borough Council in England. This was on the same day as other local elections. Sefton Metropolitan Borough Council in England, as part of the 2015 United Kingdom local elections. 22 seats, representing one third of the total Council membership, were up for election in single-member wards.

== Results by Ward (A-Z) ==
An asterisk (*) indicates an incumbent candidate.

Two asterisks (**) indicates an incumbent candidate standing for re-election in a different ward.

=== Ainsdale ===
Ainsdale
Party	Candidate	Votes	%	±%
Conservative	Terry Jones*	2,247	32.0	+2.9
Liberal Democrats	Lynne Thompson	1978	28.2	−1.6
Labour	Lesley Delves	1332	19.0	+7.9
UKIP	Terry Durrance	1165	16.6	−8.2
Green	Barbara Dutton	289	4.1	−1.1
Majority		269	3.8	+3.1
Turnout		7011	72.5	+31.3
Conservative hold		Swing		

=== Birkdale ===
Birkdale
Party	Candidate	Votes	%	±%
Liberal Democrats	Simon Shaw*	2,216	33.5	−7.5
Conservative	Poppy Jones	1374	20.8	+7.3
UKIP	Allen Ferguson	1360	20.5	−5.6
Labour	Ged Wright	1351	20.4	+6.0
Green	Tony Young	318	4.8	−0.1
Majority		842	12.7	−2.2
Turnout		6619	68.8	+31.2
Liberal Democrats hold		Swing		

=== Blundellsands ===
Blundellsands
Party	Candidate	Votes	%	±%
Labour	Daniel Lewis	3,105	45.4	+1.7
Conservative	David McIvor	2311	33.8	+2.0
UKIP	Peter Cherry	532	7.8	−6.7
Green	Peter Wilson	448	6.6	+0.8
Liberal Democrats	Andrew Jeens	440	6.4	+2.2
Majority		794	11.6	−0.3
Turnout		6836	77.5	+35.4
Labour gain from Conservative		Swing		
