= 2016 Sefton Metropolitan Borough Council election =

2016 local election in England

- 5 May 2016

22 Seats to Sefton Metropolitan Borough Council 34 seats needed for a majority
	First party	Second party	Third party
Party	Labour	Liberal Democrats	Conservative
Last election	42	16	7
Seats won	38	17	6
Seat change	▼4	▲1	▼1
Popular vote	29,573	11,335
Percentage	47.6%	15.3%	14.7%
	Fourth party	Fifth party
Party	Independents Group	Ind. Conservative
Seats won	4	1
- Results of the 2016 Sefton Metropolitan Borough Council election
Council Control before election
{{{before_election}}}
Labour
Council control after election
Labour

The 2016 Sefton Metropolitan Borough Council election took place on 5 May 2016 to elect members of Sefton Metropolitan Borough Council in England. This was on the same day as other local elections. Sefton is divided into 22 wards, each electing 3 councillors, totalling up to 66 seats. Note, only 22 seats were up for election.

Labour retained their majority control of the council despite seeing it reduced, achieving 38 seats in total and 12 seats that were up for election. They won 48% of the vote. The Liberal Democrats swept the board in Southport winning every seat up for election.

== Ward results ==
=== Birkdale ===
Birkdale
Party	Candidate	Votes	%	±%
Liberal Democrats	Richard Hands	1,443	46.04	
Labour	Ged Wright	717		
UKIP	Linda Gunn-Russo	439		
Conservative	John Lyon-Taylor	428		
Green	Bernhard Frank	107		
Majority		726		
Turnout		3,134		
Liberal Democrats hold		Swing		

== Changes between 2016 and 2018 ==
Councillor Tony Dawson (Dukes ward) was suspended from the Liberal Democrats in July 2017 but rejoined in January 2018.

Husband and wife councillors Bill Welsh and Marianne Welsh (both Norwood) left the Liberal Democrats in August 2017 and joined the Labour Party in September.

Conservative councillor Pat Ball (Dukes) resigned in September 2017 due to ill health. In the by-election on 2 November the Liberal Democrats gained the seat. New councillor John Pugh's term ends 2019.

Labour councillor Andy Dams (Blundellsands) resigned his seat in December 2017. The seat was filled in the election due on 3 May 2018.

Conservative councillor Kevin Cluskey (Ford) resigned his seat in March 2018. The seat's term ends in 2019, and will be filled along with the one ending on 3 May 2018 in a double vacancy election.
