= Sefton Council =

Local government body in England

Type
- Type: Metropolitan borough council

Leadership
- Mayor: Jennifer Corcoran, Labour since 19 May 2026
- Leader: Marion Atkinson, Labour since 18 January 2024
- Chief Executive: Philip Porter since 2023

Structure
- Seats: 66 councillors
- Graph of the party split among 66 seats.
- Political groups: Administration (36) Labour (36) Other parties (30) Liberal Democrats (17) Lydiate & Maghull Ind. (5) Reform (4) Green (2) Independent (2)
- Joint committees: Liverpool City Region Combined Authority, Merseyside Fire and Rescue Service, Merseyside Recycling and Waste Authority and Merseyside Police and Crime Commissioner
- Length of term: 4 years

Elections
- Voting system: First-past-the-post
- Last election: 7 May 2026
- Next election: 6 May 2027

Meeting place
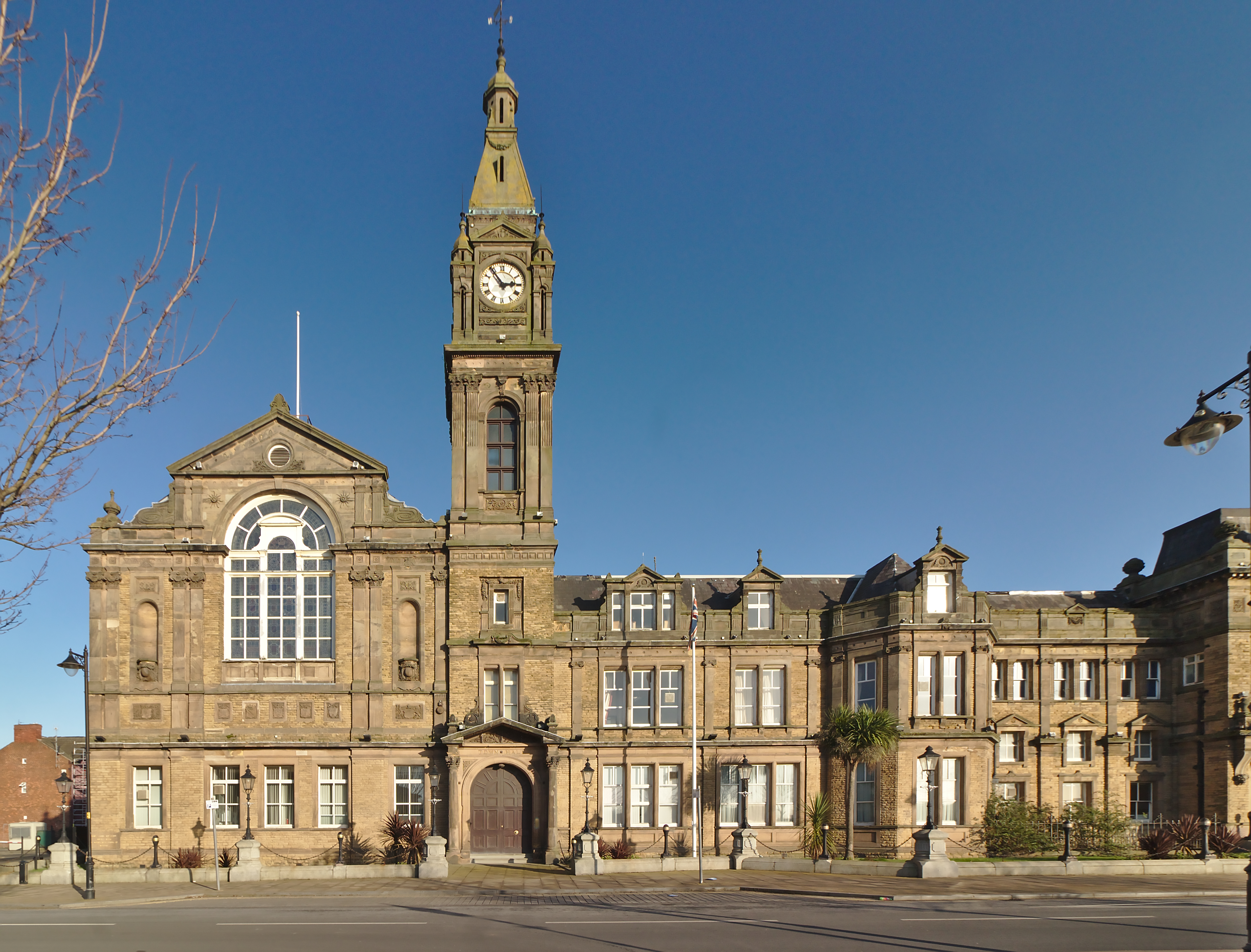

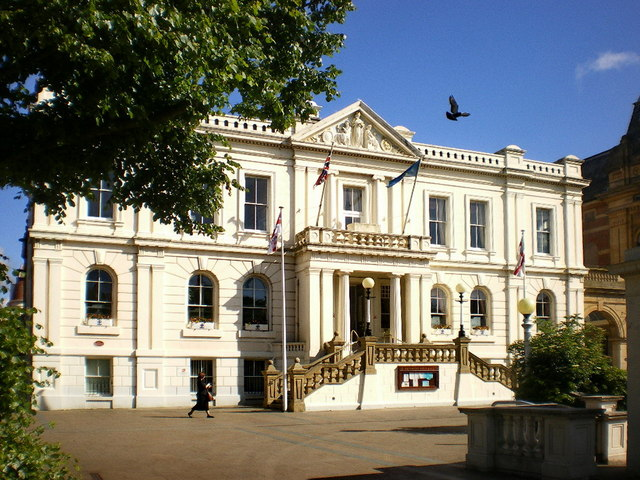
- Town Hall, Trinity Road, Bootle, L20 7AE and Town Hall, Lord Street, Southport, PR8 1DA

Website
- www.sefton.gov.uk

Sefton Council, or Sefton Metropolitan Borough Council, is the local authority of the Metropolitan Borough of Sefton in Merseyside, England. It is a metropolitan borough council and provides the majority of local government services in the borough. The council has been a member of the Liverpool City Region Combined Authority since 2014.

The council has been under Labour majority control since 2012. Full council meetings generally alternate between Bootle Town Hall and Southport Town Hall. The main administrative offices are at Magdalen House in Bootle.

== History ==
The metropolitan borough of Sefton and its council were created in 1974 under the Local Government Act 1972, covering the whole area of five former districts and parts of another, all of which were abolished at the same time:

- Bootle County Borough
- Crosby Municipal Borough
- Formby Urban District
- Litherland Urban District
- Southport County Borough
- West Lancashire Rural District (parishes of Aintree, Ince Blundell, Little Altcar, Lydiate, Maghull, Melling, Netherton, Sefton and Thornton only)

The area was transferred from Lancashire to become one of the five districts in the new metropolitan county of Merseyside. The first election to the new council was held in 1973. For its first year the council acted as a shadow authority alongside the area's outgoing authorities. The new metropolitan district and its council formally came into being on 1 April 1974, at which point the old districts and their councils were abolished.

Sefton was the only one of the 36 metropolitan boroughs created in 1974 not to be granted borough status from its creation. The shadow authority had decided against petitioning for borough status, which allows the chair of the council to take the title of mayor. It instead established charter trustees to allow the three towns of Bootle, Crosby and Southport (which each had mayors prior to the reforms) to continue to appoint separate mayors. Shortly after the new council came into effect the decision was reversed, with the council petitioning Queen Elizabeth II for borough status and abolishing the three separate town mayoralties. A charter conferring borough status on Sefton was issued in 1975. The council styles itself Sefton Council rather than its full formal name of Sefton Metropolitan Borough Council.

From 1974 until 1986 the council was a lower-tier authority, with upper-tier functions provided by Merseyside County Council. The county council was abolished in 1986 and its functions passed to Merseyside's five borough councils, including Sefton, with some services provided through joint committees.

Since 2014 the council has been a member of the Liverpool City Region Combined Authority, which has been led by the directly elected Mayor of the Liverpool City Region since 2017. The combined authority provides strategic leadership and co-ordination for certain functions across the region, but Sefton Council continues to be responsible for most local government functions.

== Governance ==
Sefton Council provides metropolitan borough services. Some strategic functions in the area are provided by the Liverpool City Region Combined Authority; the leader of Sefton Council sits on the combined authority as Sefton's representative. Parts of the borough are covered by civil parishes, which form an additional tier of local government for their areas.

=== Political control ===
The council has been under Labour majority control since 2012.

The first election to the council was held in 1973. It initially acted as a shadow authority alongside the outgoing authorities until the new arrangements formally came into effect on 1 April 1974. Political control of the council since 1974 has been as follows:

Party in control	Years
Conservative	1974–1986
No overall control	1986–2012
Labour	2012–present

=== Leadership ===
The role of mayor is largely ceremonial in Sefton. Political leadership is instead provided by the leader of the council. The first leader, Tom Glover, had been the last leader of the old Southport Borough Council. The leaders since 1974 have been:

Councillor	Party	From	To
Tom Glover	Conservative	1 Apr 1974	May 1981
Eric Storey	Conservative	May 1981	19 May 1982
Ron Watson	Conservative	19 May 1982	22 May 1986
(no leader)		22 May 1986	9 Jul 1987
Joe Benton	Labour	9 Jul 1987	Jul 1990
Peter Comer	Labour	Jul 1990	May 1991
Dave Martin	Labour	May 1991	2000
John Pugh	Liberal Democrats	2000	Jun 2001
David Bamber	Liberal Democrats	26 Jul 2001	May 2002
Dave Martin	Labour	16 May 2002	Jun 2004
Tony Robertson	Liberal Democrats	24 Jun 2004	17 May 2011
Peter Dowd	Labour	17 May 2011	May 2015
Ian Maher	Labour	21 May 2015	Jan 2024
Marion Atkinson	Labour	18 Jan 2024	

=== Composition ===
Following the 2026 election and a subsequent resignation, the composition of the council was:

Party	Seats
Labour	36
Liberal Democrats	17
Lydiate and Maghull Community Independents	5
Reform	4
Green	3
Independent	1
Total	66

The next election is due in May 2027.

== Elections ==
Since the last boundary changes in 2004, the council has comprised 66 councillors representing 22 wards, with each ward electing three councillors. Elections are held three years out of every four, with a third of the council (one councillor for each ward) elected each time for a four-year term of office.

The wards are:

- Ainsdale
- Birkdale
- Blundellsands
- Cambridge
- Church
- Derby
- Dukes
- Ford
- Harington
- Kew
- Linacre
- Litherland
- Manor
- Meols
- Molyneux
- Netherton and Orrell
- Norwood
- Park
- Ravenmeols
- St. Oswald
- Sudell
- Victoria

== Premises ==
The council meets at both Bootle Town Hall and Southport Town Hall, each of which was inherited from one of the council's predecessor authorities. Full council meetings are usually held alternately at Bootle and Southport. The council's main offices are at Magdalen House, 30 Trinity Road, Bootle. Public-facing 'one stop shops' are at Stanley Road in Bootle and Lord Street in Southport.
