= Derby (ward) =

Coordinates: 53°27′10.1″N 2°58′49.3″W

Derby is a Metropolitan Borough of Sefton ward in the Bootle Parliamentary constituency that covers the area of the town of Bootle centred on the Derby park for which the ward is named after. The population taken at the 2021 census was 13,172.

== Councillors ==
indicates seat up for re-election. indicates by-election.

Election	Councillor	Councillor	Councillor
2004	James McGinnity (Lab)	Paul Larkin (Lab)	John Rice (Lab)
2006	James McGinnity (Lab)	Paul Larkin (Lab)	John Rice (Lab)
2007	James McGinnity (Lab)	Paul Larkin (Lab)	John Rice (Lab)
2008	James McGinnity (Lab)	Paul Larkin (Lab)	Carol Gustafson (Lab)
2010	Linda Cluskey (Lab)	Paul Larkin (Lab)	Carol Gustafson (Lab)
2011	Linda Cluskey (Lab)	Dave Robinson (Lab)	Carol Gustafson (Lab)
2012	Linda Cluskey (Lab)	Dave Robinson (Lab)	Carol Gustafson (Lab)
2013 by-election	Linda Cluskey (Lab)	Dave Robinson (Lab)	Anne Thompson (Lab)
2014	Michael O'Brien (Lab)	Dave Robinson (Lab)	Anne Thompson (Lab)
2015	Michael O'Brien (Lab)	Dave Robinson (Lab)	Anne Thompson (Lab)
2016	Michael O'Brien (Lab)	Dave Robinson (Lab)	Anne Thompson (Lab)
2018	Michael O'Brien (Lab)	Dave Robinson (Lab)	Anne Thompson (Lab)
2019	Michael O'Brien (Lab)	Dave Robinson (Lab)	Anne Thompson (Lab)
2021	Brenda O'Brien (Lab)	Dave Robinson (Lab)	Anne Thompson (Lab)
2022	Brenda O'Brien (Lab)	Dave Robinson (Lab)	Anne Thompson (Lab)

== Election results ==
=== Elections of the 2020s ===
Sefton Metropolitan Borough Council Municipal Elections 2022: Derby
Party	Candidate	Votes	%	±%
Labour	Brenda O'Brien*	1,757	82.6	+18.5
Independent	John McDonald	204	9.6	N/A
Conservative	Daniel Nuttall	165	7.8	+0.1
Majority		1,553	73.0	
Turnout		2,126	23.6	
Labour hold		Swing		

Sefton Metropolitan Borough Council Municipal Elections 2021: Derby
Party	Candidate	Votes	%	±%
Labour	Anne Thompson	1,479	63.6	
Labour	Brenda O'Brien	1,290	55.5	
Independent	Mike Brennan	501	21.5	
Conservative	Daniel Nuttall	176	7.6	
Green	Alwynne Cartmell	149	6.4	
Conservative	Anne Clegg	115	4.9	
Independent	Mike Duffy	111	4.8	
Independent	Peter Nelson	100	4.3	
Majority				
Turnout				
Labour hold		Swing		
Labour hold		Swing		

=== Elections of the 2010s ===
Sefton Metropolitan Borough Council Municipal Elections 2019: Derby
Party	Candidate	Votes	%	±%
Labour	Dave Robinson	1,627	85.0	
Conservative	Daniel Paul Nuttall	146	7.6	
Liberal Democrats	Ardash Makdani	141	7.4	
Majority		1,481		
Turnout		1,914	21.5	
Labour hold		Swing		

Sefton Metropolitan Borough Council Municipal Elections 2018: Derby
Party	Candidate	Votes	%	±%
Labour	Mike O'Brien	1,834	87.7	▲15.6
Conservative	David Bright	163	7.8	▲4.4
Liberal Democrats	Andrew Tonkiss	94	4.5	N/A
Majority		1671	79.9	
Turnout		2091	22.9	
Labour hold		Swing	▲10.0	

Sefton Metropolitan Borough Council Municipal Elections 2016: Derby
Party	Candidate	Votes	%	±%
Labour	Anne Thompson	1,636	80.0	
UKIP	Susan Hughes	281	13.7	
Green	Alwynne Cartmel	70	3.4	
Conservative	Angela Rankin	59	2.9	
Majority		1,355		
Turnout		2,046		
Labour hold		Swing		

Sefton Metropolitan Borough Council Municipal Elections 2015: Derby
Party	Candidate	Votes	%	±%
Labour	Dave Robinson	4,139	78.9	
UKIP	Paul Nuttall	812	15.5	
Green	Alwynne Cartmel	295	5.6	
Majority		3,327		
Turnout		5,246		
Labour hold		Swing		

Sefton Metropolitan Borough Council Municipal Elections 2014: Derby
Party	Candidate	Votes	%	±%
Labour	Michael O'Brien	1,575	72.1	
UKIP	Gary Crook	534	24.5	
Conservative	Brad Hankin	75	3.4	
Majority		1,041		
Turnout		2,184		
Labour hold		Swing		

Sefton Metropolitan Borough Council Municipal Elections 2012: Derby
Party	Candidate	Votes	%	±%
Labour	Carol Gustafson	1,809	81	
UKIP	John Rice	302	14	
Conservative	Alex McIvor	64	3	
Liberal Democrats	Jennifer Robertson	56	3	
Majority		1,507		
Turnout		2,231	25	
Labour hold		Swing		

Sefton Metropolitan Borough Council Municipal Elections 2011: Derby
Party	Candidate	Votes	%	±%
Labour	Dave Robinson	2071	76%	
UKIP	John Philip Rice	404	15%	
Liberal Democrats	Jennifer Robertson	107	4%	
Conservative	Kenneth George Parry	95	3%	
English Democrat	Dean McGrane	55	2%	
Majority				
Turnout		2732	30%	
Labour gain from Liberal Democrats		Swing		

Sefton Metropolitan Borough Council Municipal Elections 2010: Derby
Party	Candidate	Votes	%	±%
Labour	Linda Cluskey	3387	70%	
UKIP	John Rice	724	15%	
Liberal Democrats	Peter Gill	518	11%	
Conservative	Kenneth George Parry	202	4%	
Majority				
Turnout		4831	53%	
Labour hold		Swing		
