= Ford (ward) =

Coordinates: 53.4659°N 2.9857°W

Ford is a Metropolitan Borough of Sefton ward in the Bootle Parliamentary constituency that covers the northern part of the locality of Litherland and all of Ford.

== Councillors ==
indicates seat up for re-election. indicates by-election.

Election	Councillor	Councillor	Councillor
2004	Ian Moncur (Lab)	Kevin Cluskey (Lab)	Owen Brady (Lab)
2006	Ian Moncur (Lab)	Kevin Cluskey (Lab)	Owen Brady (Lab)
2007	Ian Moncur (Lab)	Kevin Cluskey (Lab)	Owen Brady (Lab)
2008	Ian Moncur (Lab)	Kevin Cluskey (Lab)	Owen Brady (Lab)
2010	Ian Moncur (Lab)	Kevin Cluskey (Lab)	Owen Brady (Lab)
2011	Ian Moncur (Lab)	Kevin Cluskey (Lab)	Owen Brady (Lab)
2012	Ian Moncur (Lab)	Kevin Cluskey (Lab)	Paulette Lappin (Lab)
2014	Ian Moncur (Lab)	Kevin Cluskey (Lab)	Paulette Lappin (Lab)
2015	Ian Moncur (Lab)	Kevin Cluskey (Lab)	Paulette Lappin (Lab)
2016	Ian Moncur (Lab)	Kevin Cluskey (Lab)	Paulette Lappin (Lab)
2018	Liz Dowd (Lab)	Ian Moncur (Lab)	Paulette Lappin (Lab)
2019	Liz Dowd (Lab)	Ian Moncur (Lab)	Paulette Lappin (Lab)
2021	Liz Dowd (Lab)	Ian Moncur (Lab)	Paulette Lappin (Lab)
2022	Liz Dowd (Lab)	Ian Moncur (Lab)	Paulette Lappin (Lab)

== Election results ==
=== Elections of the 2010s ===
Sefton Metropolitan Borough Council Municipal Elections 2011: Ford
Party	Candidate	Votes	%	±%
Labour	Cllr Kevin Cluskey	2281	80%	
UKIP	Philip James Wordley	205	7%	
Conservative	Jessamine Miles Hounslea	196	7%	
Liberal Democrats	Nicola Jane Smith	84	3%	
BNP	Jane Alexandra Leary	71	3%	
Majority				
Turnout		2837	32%	
Labour hold		Swing		

Sefton Metropolitan Borough Council Municipal Elections 2010: Ford
Party	Candidate	Votes	%	±%
Labour	Ian Moncur	3670	72%	
Liberal Democrats	David James Nolan	543	11%	
Conservative	Jessamine Miles Hounslea	402	8%	
UKIP	Philip James Wordley	306	6%	
BNP	Charles Stewart	185	4%	
Majority				
Turnout		5106	56%	
Labour hold		Swing		
