= Blundellsands (ward) =

Electoral ward of Sefton Central, Merseyside, England

Coordinates: 53.486746°N 3.044057°W

Blundellsands is a Metropolitan Borough of Sefton ward in the Sefton Central Parliamentary constituency that covers the localities of Blundellsands and Brighton-le-Sands. The total population of this ward taken at the 2011 Census was 11,280.

== Councillors ==
indicates seat up for re-election. indicates by-election.

Election	Councillor	Councillor	Councillor
2004	Robert Roberts (Con)	Wendy Jones (Con)	Paula Parry (Con)
2006	Robert Roberts (Con)	Wendy Jones (Con)	Paula Parry (Con)
2007	Robert Roberts (Con)	Peter Papworth (Con)	Paula Parry (Con)
2008	Robert Roberts (Con)	Peter Papworth (Con)	Paula Parry (Con)
2010	Sean Dorgan (Con)	Peter Papworth (Con)	Paula Parry (Con)
2011	Sean Dorgan (Con)	Peter Papworth (Con)	Paula Parry (Con)
2012	Sean Dorgan (Con)	Peter Papworth (Con)	Veronica Bennett (Lab)
2014	Andy Dams (Lab)	Peter Papworth (Con)	Veronica Bennett (Lab)
2015	Andy Dams (Lab)	Daniel Lewis (Lab)	Veronica Bennett (Lab)
2016	Andy Dams (Lab)	Daniel Lewis (Lab)	Diane Roscoe (Lab)
2018	Sam Marshall (Lab)	Daniel Lewis (Lab)	Diane Roscoe (Lab)
2019	Sam Marshall (Lab)	Christine Howard (Lab)	Diane Roscoe (Lab)
2021	Natasha Carlin (Lab)	Christine Howard (Lab)	Diane Roscoe (Lab)
2022	Natasha Carlin (Lab)	Christine Howard (Lab)	Diane Roscoe (Lab)

== Election results ==
=== Elections of the 2020s ===
Sefton Metropolitan Borough Council Municipal Elections 2022: Blundellsands
Party	Candidate	Votes	%	±%
Labour	Natasha Olivia Carlin	2,301	66	10
Conservative	Harry Bliss	791	23	−9
Liberal Democrats	Brian Dunning	394	11	4
Majority		1,510	43	19
Turnout		3,626	38	−
Labour hold		Swing		

Sefton Metropolitan Borough Council Municipal Elections 2021: Blundellsands
Party	Candidate	Votes	%	±%
Labour	Diane Elizabeth Roscoe	2,031	29	
Labour	Natasha Olivia Carlin	1,734	25	
Conservative	Martyn Paul Barber	1,133	16	
Conservative	Simon Iain Jamieson	927	13	
Green	John Gerrard Volynchook	509	7	
Liberal Democrats	Keith William Cawdron	279	4	
Liberal Democrats	Brian Dunning	181	3	
Liberal Party and Local Resident	Angela Theresa Preston	167	2	
Majority		898	13	
Majority		807	12	
Turnout		6,961	41	3
Labour hold		Swing		
Labour hold		Swing		

=== Elections of the 2010s ===
Sefton Metropolitan Borough Council Municipal Elections 2019: Blundellsands
Party	Candidate	Votes	%	±%
Labour	Christine Catherine Howard	1,721	48	+3
Conservative	Martyn Paul Barber	931	26	−8
Green	Alison Moira Gibbon	390	11	+4
Liberal Democrats	Brian Frederick Dunning	323	9	+3
UKIP	Kevin John Stanton	187	5	−3
Majority		790	22	+11
Turnout		3,552	38	−36
Labour hold		Swing		

Sefton Metropolitan Borough Council Municipal Elections 2018: Blundellsands
Party	Candidate	Votes	%	±%
Labour	Sam Marshall	2,027	56	+12
Conservative	Wendy Moore	1,166	32	0
Liberal Democrats	Brian Frederick Dunning	269	7	3
Green	Alison Gibbon	164	5	−1
Majority		861	24	12
Turnout		3,626	38	−6
Labour hold		Swing		

Sefton Metropolitan Borough Council Municipal Elections 2016: Blundellsands
Party	Candidate	Votes	%	±%
Labour	Diane Elizabeth Roscoe	2,202	64	+11
Conservative	Aaron Hugh Ellis	1,031	30	−6
Green	Michael James Walsh	233	7	+4
Majority		1,171	34	17
Turnout		3,626	38	−6
Labour hold		Swing		

Sefton Metropolitan Borough Council Municipal Elections 2015: Blundellsands
Party	Candidate	Votes	%	±%
Labour	Cllr Daniel Terence Lewis	3,105	45	+2
Conservative	David McIvor	2,311	34	−10
UKIP	Peter George Cherry	532	8	N/A
Green	Peter Wilson	448	7	−
Liberal Democrats	Andrew Robert Jeens	440	6	−1
Majority		794	11	10
Turnout		6,836	74	27
Labour gain from Conservative		Swing		

Sefton Metropolitan Borough Council Municipal Elections 2014: Blundellsands
Party	Candidate	Votes	%	±%
Labour	Cllr Andy Dams	1,625	44	+7
Conservative	Sean Dorgan	1,181	32	−5
UKIP	Peter Cherry	537	14	+10
Green	William Wilson	216	6	N/A
Liberal Democrats	Carol Tonkiss	156	4	−19
Majority		444	12	11
Turnout		3,715	41	−34
Labour gain from Conservative		Swing	{{{swing}}}	

Sefton Metropolitan Borough Council Municipal Elections 2012: Blundellsands
Party	Candidate	Votes	%	±%
Labour	Cllr Veronica Bennett	2,117	53	
Conservative	Paula Margaret Parry	1,448	36	
UKIP	Tony Ledgerton	179	5	
Green	Laurence George Rankin	138	3	
Liberal Democrats	Kris Brown	87	2	
Majority		669	17	
Turnout		3,969	45	
Labour gain from Conservative		Swing	{{{swing}}}	

Sefton Metropolitan Borough Council Municipal Elections 2011: Blundellsands
Party	Candidate	Votes	%	±%
Conservative	Cllr Peter Papworth	1,823	44	
Labour	Ben Winstanley	1,802	43	
Liberal Democrats	Carol Tonkiss	281	7	
Green	Laurence Rankin	280	7	
Majority		21	1	
Turnout		4,186	47	
Conservative hold		Swing		

Sefton Metropolitan Borough Council Municipal Elections 2010: Blundellsands
Party	Candidate	Votes	%	±%
Conservative	Sean Dorgan	2,438	37	
Labour	Ben Winstanley	2,353	36	
Liberal Democrats	James Philip Ludley	1,555	23	
UKIP	Peter George Cherry	275	4	
Majority		85	1	
Turnout		6,621	75	
Conservative hold		Swing		
