= 2026 Sefton Council election =

2026 English local government election

- 7 May 2026

All 66 seats to Sefton Council 34 seats needed for a majority
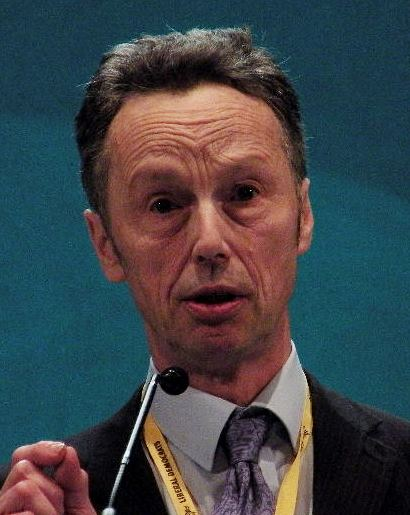
	First party	Second party	Third party
Leader	Marion Atkinson	John Pugh	Mike Morris
Party	Labour	Liberal Democrats	Reform
Leader's seat	Aintree and Maghull South	Dukes	Cambridge (defeated)
Last election	49 seats, 54.0%	9 seats, 16.7%	0 seats, 0.2%
Seats before	51	9	1
Seats won	36	17	5
Seat change	▼15	▲8	▲4
Popular vote	71,377	37,413	63,800
Percentage	29.8%	15.6%	26.7%
Swing	▼24.2%	▼1.1%	▲26.5%
	Fourth party	Fifth party	Sixth party
Leader		Neil Doolin
Party	L&M Community Independents	Green	Conservative
Leader's seat		Waterloo
Last election	0 seats, 2.0%	1 seat, 8.8%	4 seats, 14.7%
Seats before	0	1	3
Seats won	5	3	0
Seat change	▲5	▲2	▼3
Popular vote	9,136	30,307	19,471
Percentage	3.8%	12.7%	8.1%
Swing	▲1.8%	▲3.9%	▼6.6%
- Winner of each seat at the 2026 Sefton Metropolitan Borough Council election.
Leader before election
Marion Atkinson
Labour
Leader after election
Marion Atkinson
Labour

The 2026 Sefton Council election was held on Thursday 7 May 2026, alongside other local elections in the United Kingdom. The whole Council of 66 members of Sefton Council in Merseyside were elected.

Labour retained control of the council on a significantly reduced majority, while the Liberal Democrats nearly doubled their number of councillors. Reform UK won its first councillors at an election in the borough, while the Greens enjoyed their best result to this point in terms of both seats and vote share. Lydiate and Maghull Community Independents won 5 seats, while the Conservatives lost all representation on the council.

On 12 May, a Reform UK councillor resigned from his party within days of being elected and sits now as an independent.

== Background ==
Sefton Metropolitan Borough Council was created in 1974. The Conservatives controlled the council from its creation until 1986, when the council fell into no overall control. Labour became the largest party in 1988 but did not form their first majority administration until 24 years later. The Liberal Democrats briefly became the largest party between 2000 and 2002, and again for the more prolonged period between 2004 and 2011. Labour have formed majority administrations since 2012 with the Liberal Democrats serving as the principal opposition (aside from 2021 which saw the Conservatives hold an equal number of seats).

In the most recent election, Labour made no net gains or losses, winning a seat from the Conservatives but also losing a seat to the Green Party and giving the Greens their first seat on the council. The Liberal Democrats also held a seat gained through a defection from the Conservatives.

== Council composition ==
After 2024 election		Before 2026 election (Note: Last updated 10 February 2026.)	
Party	Seats	Party	Seats
Labour	49	Labour	51
Liberal Democrats	9	Liberal Democrats	9
Conservative	4	Conservative	3
Green	1	Green	1
Reform	0	Reform	1
Your Party	N/A	Your Party	1
Independent	2	Independent	0
Vacant	1	Vacant	0

Changes 2024–2026:

- March 2024: Paula Spencer (Labour) dies – by-election held June 2024
- May 2024: John Fairclough (Labour) resigns – by-election held July 2024
- June 2024: Helen Duerden (Labour) wins by-election
- July 2024: Jim Conalty (Labour) wins by-election
- October 2024:
  - Paul Tweed (Labour) expelled from party
  - Paul Tweed (Independent) resigns – by-election held November 2024
- November 2024: Julia Garner (Labour) wins by-election
- May 2025: Natasha Carlin (Independent, elected as Labour) resigns – by-election held June 2025
- June 2025: David Roscoe (Labour) nominally gains by-election from Independent
- August 2025: Mike Morris (Conservative) joins Reform

== Election result ==
Council composition after the 2024 election

Council composition after the 2026 election

2026 Sefton Metropolitan Borough Council Election
Party	Candidates	Seats	Gains	Losses	Net gain/loss	Seats %	Votes %	Votes	+/−
Labour	66	36	N/A	N/A	▼15	54.5	29.8	71,377	–24.2
Liberal Democrats	55	17	N/A	N/A	▲8	25.8	15.6	37,413	–1.1
Reform	66	5	N/A	N/A	▲4	7.6	26.7	63,800	+26.5
L&M Community Independents	6	5	N/A	N/A	▲5	7.6	3.8	9,136	+1.8
Green	51	3	N/A	N/A	▲2	4.5	12.7	30,307	+3.9
Conservative	49	0	N/A	N/A	▼3	0.0	8.1	19,471	–6.6
Independent	7	0	N/A	N/A	Steady	0.0	2.3	5,528	+1.9
Formby Residents Action Group	2	0	N/A	N/A	Steady	0.0	0.5	1,321	–1.5
Southport Community Independents	4	0	N/A	N/A	Steady	0.0	0.3	719	N/A
TUSC	3	0	N/A	N/A	Steady	0.0	0.1	243	N/A
Monster Raving Loony	1	0	N/A	N/A	Steady	0.0	<0.1	80	N/A
Your Party	0	0	N/A	N/A	▼1	0.0	N/A (Note: Did not stand candidates.)	N/A	N/A

== Ward results ==
Councillors that were standing for re-election are marked with an asterisk (*).

=== Ainsdale ===
Ainsdale (3 seats)
Party	Candidate	Votes	%	±%
Liberal Democrats	Lynne Thompson*	2,199	48.5	–3.0
Liberal Democrats	Lesley Delves	1,679	37.0	–14.5
Liberal Democrats	Rowenna Gibson	1,313	28.9	–22.6
Reform	Victor Graham Annells	1,199	26.4	N/A
Reform	Norman Leslie Gwyther	1,090	24.0	N/A
Reform	Mal Malbert	1,057	23.3	N/A
Conservative	Tony Brough*	771	17.0	+3.3
Labour	Janet Harrison-Kelly*	771	17.0	–14.0
Labour	Frank Hanley	770	17.0	–14.0
Labour	Mark Hughes	737	16.2	–14.8
Conservative	Alan Salter	490	10.8	–2.9
Green	Joseph John Connolly	403	8.9	+5.1
Green	Alwynne Ann Cartmell	399	8.8	+5.0
Conservative	Michael James Shaw	391	8.6	–5.1
Green	Alasdair Martyn Smith	341	7.5	+3.7
Turnout		~4,537	45.1	+6.9
Registered electors		10,061		
Liberal Democrats hold				
Liberal Democrats gain from Labour				
Liberal Democrats gain from Conservative				

=== Aintree & Maghull South ===
Aintree & Maghull South (3 seats)
Party	Candidate	Votes	%
Labour	Marion Atkinson*	1,726	43.0
Labour	Danny Burns*	1,656	41.2
Labour	Sam Hinde*	1,519	37.8
Reform	Karen Elizabeth Moore	1,172	29.2
Reform	Debbie Richards	1,166	29.0
Reform	Dennis Leong	1,157	28.8
Independent	Mark Brian Pennock	1,012	25.2
Independent	Philip Benjamin Chadwick	978	24.4
Independent	Patricia Spencer	973	24.2
Liberal Democrats	Angela Robinson	159	4.0
Liberal Democrats	Richard Hackford	157	3.9
Conservative	Louise Barber	136	3.4
Liberal Democrats	Daniel Snape	128	3.2
Conservative	Marianne Martina Kavanagh	106	2.6
Turnout		~4,015	
Labour win (new seat)			
Labour win (new seat)			
Labour win (new seat)			

=== Birkdale ===
Birkdale
Party	Candidate	Votes	%	±%
Liberal Democrats	Iain Brodie Browne*	1,794	39.5	+0.2
Liberal Democrats	Simon John Shaw*	1,645	36.2	–3.1
Reform	Mike Ryder	1,372	30.2	N/A
Reform	Lynne Lloyd-Stafford	1,298	28.5	N/A
Reform	Mark Ormsby	1,251	27.5	N/A
Liberal Democrats	Dominic Pillai	1,243	27.3	–12.0
Labour	Sonya Ann Kelly*	1,137	25.0	–16.6
Labour	Callum Luke Naylor	879	19.3	–22.3
Labour	Carla Curtis-Tansley	801	17.6	–24.0
Green	David Andrew McIntosh	460	10.1	+5.2
Green	Michael Johns Binns	458	10.1	+5.2
Green	Simon Peter Maxwell	385	8.5	+3.6
Conservative	Angela Mary Halliwell	323	7.1	–7.1
Conservative	Roger William Halliwell	300	6.6	–7.6
Conservative	Marie Hansson-Hesketh	295	6.5	–7.7
Turnout		~4,547		
Liberal Democrats hold				
Liberal Democrats hold				
Reform gain from Labour				

=== Blundellsands ===
Blundellsands (3 seats)
Party	Candidate	Votes	%	±%
Labour	Diane Roscoe*	1,792	44.4	–23.9
Labour	David Roscoe	1,752	43.4	–24.9
Labour	Christine Howard*	1,578	39.1	–29.2
Reform	Gerard Maher	864	21.4	N/A
Reform	Les Richards	830	20.6	N/A
Reform	Mark Wilcock	752	18.6	N/A
Green	Jenni Meriel Cooper	712	17.6	+9.4
Green	Lyndsey Marie Doolin	683	16.9	+8.7
Green	Sophie Victoria Whitley-Forshaw	604	15.0	+6.8
Conservative	Katie Maria Burgess	530	13.1	–3.6
Conservative	Sean Dorgan	505	12.5	–4.2
Liberal Democrats	Rebecca Hanson	418	10.4	+3.6
Conservative	Sunny Sawhney	402	10.0	–6.7
Liberal Democrats	Keith Cawdron	344	8.5	+1.7
Liberal Democrats	Brian Dunning	258	6.4	–0.4
Monster Raving Loony	Wing Commander Lucky Luke Jackson	80	2.0	N/A
Turnout		~4,035	44.1	+8.2
Registered electors		9,159		
Labour gain from Independent				
Labour hold				
Labour hold				

=== Bootle East ===
Bootle East
Party	Candidate	Votes	%
Labour	Graeme Thomas Cooper	913	41.7
Labour	Maria Porter	895	40.9
Labour	Brenda O’Brien	841	38.4
Reform	Phil Baker	812	37.1
Reform	John Darbyshire	743	34.0
Reform	Mark Rowlands	698	31.9
Green	Frances Henderson	413	18.9
Green	Roy Greason	401	18.3
Green	Morgan Lynch	392	17.9
Liberal Democrats	Jeremy Nelson	136	6.2
Liberal Democrats	Raymond Woods	123	5.6
Conservative	Patrick Darke	99	4.5
TUSC	Dean Young	98	4.5
Turnout		6,564	
Registered electors		TBC	
Labour win (new seat)			
Labour win (new seat)			
Labour win (new seat)			

=== Bootle West ===
Bootle West
Party	Candidate	Votes	%
Labour	Jim Conalty	794	39.6
Labour	Dan McKee	713	35.6
Reform	Jay Leslie Cooper	705	35.2
Labour	Mhairi Doyle	689	34.4
Reform	Kristina Elizabeth Dwyer	660	32.9
Reform	Andrew Thompson	658	32.8
Green	Lorelei Dyson	520	25.9
Green	Jordan Raymond Cox	505	25.2
Green	Charlotte Elizabeth Weaver	465	23.2
Liberal Democrats	Lucy Woods	140	7.0
Conservative	Lynne Margaret Bold	102	5.1
TUSC	Liam Williams	61	3.0
Turnout		6,012	
Labour win (new seat)			
Labour win (new seat)			
Reform win (new seat)			

=== Cambridge ===
Cambridge
Party	Candidate	Votes	%	±%
Liberal Democrats	Leo Francis Evans	1,581	38.5	+2.0
Liberal Democrats	Mike Sammon	1,510	36.8	+0.3
Liberal Democrats	Pat Keith	1,430	34.8	–1.7
Reform	Sinclair D’Albuquerque	1,338	32.6	N/A
Reform	Mike Morris	1,289	31.4	N/A
Reform	Kev Hookham	1,230	29.9	N/A
Conservative	Caroline Prendergast	578	12.6	–18.9
Conservative	Gary Haran Doyle	564	13.7	–17.8
Conservative	Sam Constantine	530	12.9	–18.6
Labour	Helen Avis	409	10.0	–15.6
Green	Carla Fox	375	9.1	+2.7
Green	Stephen William Hesketh	370	9.0	+2.6
Green	Caroline Michelle Longdon	366	8.9	+2.5
Labour	Nina Samantha Killen	354	8.6	–17.0
Labour	Lily Ritchie	330	8.0	–17.6
Southport Community Independents	John Boye	128	3.1	N/A
Turnout		12,382		
Registered electors		9,716		
Liberal Democrats hold				
Liberal Democrats hold				
Liberal Democrats gain from Reform				

=== Duke's ===
Duke’s
Party	Candidate	Votes	%	±%
Liberal Democrats	John David Pugh	1,653	40.9	+11.6
Liberal Democrats	Michael Paul Braham	1,445	35.8	+6.5
Liberal Democrats	Danny Howard	1,343	33.3	+4.0
Conservative	Mike Prendergast	1,136	28.1	–13.6
Reform	Owen James Phillips	1,047	25.9	N/A
Conservative	Laura Nuttall	956	23.7	–18.0
Reform	Lorinda Swift	946	23.4	N/A
Reform	Sarah Zhang	935	23.2	N/A
Conservative	Benjamin Younis	759	18.8	–22.9
Green	David Ian Newman	384	9.5	+3.6
Green	Kim Doyle	367	9.1	+3.2
Labour	Alexander Constantine	304	7.5	–15.6
Labour	Charlotte Megan Kelly	294	7.3	–15.8
Green	Ganesh Chandra Paul	287	7.1	+1.2
Labour	Patrick Sharman	255	6.3	–16.8
Turnout		12,111		
Registered electors		10,442		
Liberal Democrats gain from Conservative				
Liberal Democrats hold				
Liberal Democrats hold				

=== Ford ===
Ford
Party	Candidate	Votes	%	±%
Labour	Liz Dowd	1,209	46.0	–34.9
Labour	Paulette Lappin	1,087	41.3	–39.6
Labour	Ian George Moncur	1,077	40.9	–40.0
Independent	Ed Conley	816	31.0	N/A
Independent	Paul Rogers	778	29.6	N/A
Reform	David Jones	776	29.5	N/A
Independent	Jack Colbert	722	27.4	N/A
Reform	Neil Lawrence Miney	679	25.8	N/A
Reform	Craig Owen Sweeney	649	24.7	N/A
Conservative	Alex McIvor	100	3.8	–2.5
Turnout		7,893		
Registered electors		9,243		
Labour hold				
Labour hold				
Labour hold				

=== Formby East ===
Formby East
Party	Candidate	Votes	%
Labour	Catie Page	2,045	46.2
Labour	Chris Page	1,833	41.4
Labour	Anthony Howe	1,676	37.9
Reform	Nick Marley	1,186	26.8
Reform	David Walker	1,137	25.7
Reform	Andy Wright	1,047	23.7
Formby Residents Action Group	Maria Bennett	836	18.9
Conservative	Colin Appleton	571	12.9
Green	Carol Ann Bradley	546	12.3
Conservative	David Dutton	534	12.1
Green	Alison Moira Gibbon	518	11.7
Green	Mike Walsh	395	8.9
Conservative	Angelica Sadrieva	327	7.4
Liberal Democrats	Erin Harvey	244	5.5
Liberal Democrats	Andrew Greenan	234	5.3
Liberal Democrats	Gary Wallis	146	3.3
Turnout		13,275	
Registered electors		TBC	
Labour win (new seat)			
Labour win (new seat)			
Labour win (new seat)			

=== Formby West ===
Formby West
Party	Candidate	Votes	%
Labour	Karen Cavanagh	1,838	39.1
Labour	Peter Harvey	1,706	36.3
Labour	Carol Richards	1,685	35.8
Reform	Chris Hornby	1,144	24.3
Reform	Maria Patricia Cusick	1,104	23.5
Reform	Dave Irving	1,100	23.4
Conservative	Denise Dutton	1,089	23.2
Conservative	Amanda Brown	1,024	21.8
Conservative	Martyn Paul Barber	823	17.5
Green	Peter George Cherry	532	11.3
Formby Residents Action Group	Paul Graham Wiencke	485	10.3
Green	Susanne Zajitschek	400	8.5
Green	Felix Zajitschek	383	8.1
Liberal Democrats	Roy Connell	293	6.2
Liberal Democrats	Annie Gorski	259	5.5
Liberal Democrats	Simon Lewis	244	5.2
Turnout		14,109	
Registered electors		TBC	
Labour win (new seat)			
Labour win (new seat)			
Labour win (new seat)			

=== Great Crosby ===
Great Crosby
Party	Candidate	Votes	%
Labour	Jen Corcoran	1,563	39.9
Labour	Les Byrom	1,534	39.1
Labour	Janet Grace	1,486	37.9
Green	Carla Burns	1,149	29.3
Green	James David O’Keeffe	1,032	33.7
Green	Ben Sambrook	896	22.9
Reform	Victor Hudson Foulds	767	19.6
Reform	Stephen Gavin Mulcahy	738	18.8
Reform	Steve Ray	723	18.4
Liberal Democrats	Hannah Jane Gee	563	14.4
Liberal Democrats	Carol Ann Hill	381	9.7
Liberal Democrats	Sean Doherty	372	9.5
Conservative	Oliver John Doyle	264	6.7
Turnout		11,468	
Registered electors		TBC	
Labour win (new seat)			
Labour win (new seat)			
Labour win (new seat)			

=== Kew ===
Kew
Party	Candidate	Votes	%	±%
Liberal Democrats	Anne Corbishley	1,576	40.7	+4.6
Liberal Democrats	Yaso Sathiy	1,424	36.8	+0.7
Liberal Democrats	Mike Kirby	1,352	34.9	–1.2
Reform	Nicholas Guy Robinson	1,310	33.9	N/A
Reform	Leigh Christian Duffy	1,276	33.0	N/A
Reform	Jason Michael Clarke	1,137	29.4	N/A
Labour	Melanie Horne	834	21.6	–22.2
Labour	Michael Burt	768	19.9	–23.9
Labour	Trevor James Vaughan	667	17.2	–26.6
Southport Community Independents	Dawn Aspinall	339	8.8	N/A
Conservative	Stuart Iain Fleming	298	7.7	–6.5
Conservative	Xabi Anthony Michael Arthur	280	7.2	–7.0
Conservative	Morgan Walton	197	5.1	–9.1
Southport Community Independents	Alix Shaw	149	3.9	N/A
Turnout		11,607		
Registered electors		10,720		
Liberal Democrats gain from Independent				
Liberal Democrats gain from Labour				
Liberal Democrats gain from Labour				

=== Litherland ===
Litherland
Party	Candidate	Votes	%	±%
Labour	Julia Garner	1,043	41.8	–32.2
Labour	John Kelly	966	38.7	–35.3
Labour	Daren Veidman	838	33.5	–40.5
Reform	Joanne Rooney	781	31.3	N/A
Reform	Mark David McParlan	780	31.2	N/A
Reform	Manuel Antonio Hernandez Perez	732	29.3	N/A
Green	Paul Andrew Dunbar	557	22.3	+15.4
Green	Jennifer Stephanie Grice	556	22.3	+15.4
Green	Matthew William Johnson	474	19.0	+12.1
Independent	Ian Smith	249	10.0	–2.1
Liberal Democrats	Shaul Gilroy	147	5.9	+3.6
Liberal Democrats	Sarah Harding	138	5.5	+3.2
Liberal Democrats	Marian Pope	121	4.8	+2.5
Conservative	Robert Percival Greenwood	112	4.5	–0.3
Turnout		7,494		
Registered electors		9,055		
Labour hold				
Labour hold				
Labour hold				

=== Lydiate & Maghull West ===
Lydiate and Maghull West
Party	Candidate	Votes	%
L&M Community Independents	Liam Stoddart	1,723	37.1
L&M Community Independents	Barry Nixon	1,716	37.0
L&M Community Independents	Sonia Crompton	1,700	36.6
Labour	Chloe Parker	1,552	33.4
Labour	Kenneth Michael Hughes	1,439	31.0
Labour	Mike Desmond	1,407	30.3
Reform	Marijke Chamberlain	1,018	21.9
Reform	Chindam Ng	982	21.2
Reform	Alex Fry	961	20.7
Conservative	Anne Clegg	470	10.1
Liberal Democrats	David Mellalieu	304	6.5
Conservative	Michaelina Maria Dettlaff-Zinonoz	256	5.5
Conservative	Jessamine Miles Hounslea	200	4.3
Liberal Democrats	Mark Bisbey	128	2.8
Liberal Democrats	Richard Marston	72	1.6
Turnout		13,928	
Registered electors		TBC	
L&M Community Independents win (new seat)			
L&M Community Independents win (new seat)			
L&M Community Independents win (new seat)			

=== Maghull East ===
Maghull East
Party	Candidate	Votes	%
Labour	Phil Hart	1,468	39.6
L&M Community Independents	Joanne Elizabeth McCall	1,413	38.2
L&M Community Independents	David Leatherbarrow	1,396	37.7
Labour	June Burns	1,358	36.7
Labour	James Joseph Hansen	1,259	34.0
L&M Community Independents	Paul Francis McCord	1,188	32.1
Reform	Gary Anthony Carter	795	21.5
Reform	Greg Robers	746	20.1
Reform	Emlyn Williams	701	18.9
Conservative	Craig Peter Titherington	168	4.5
Conservative	Marcus Julian Romaine Bleasdale	165	4.5
Conservative	Adam Marsden	129	3.5
Liberal Democrats	Pauline McGregor	115	3.1
Liberal Democrats	Raymond Lee	113	3.1
Liberal Democrats	Jane Elizabeth Nelson	97	2.6
Turnout		11,111	
Registered electors		TBC	
Labour win (new seat)			
L&M Community Independents win (new seat)			
L&M Community Independents win (new seat)			

=== Meols ===
Meols
Party	Candidate	Votes	%	±%
Liberal Democrats	John Dodd	2,205	51.3	+5.0
Liberal Democrats	Daniel George Lewis	1,822	42.4	–3.9
Liberal Democrats	Lauren Keith	1,807	42.0	–4.3
Reform	Peyton Megan Edwards	1,343	31.2	N/A
Reform	Catherine Mary Stephenson	1,276	29.7	N/A
Reform	Larry Sweeney	1,272	29.6	N/A
Labour	Joseph Thomas Hart	393	9.1	–18.4
Green	Pauline Ann Hesketh	361	8.4	+1.8
Conservative	Adam Charles Edward Kennaugh	352	8.2	–11.4
Labour	Ros Mason	351	8.2	–19.3
Conservative	Bob Teesdale	350	8.1	–11.4
Conservative	Darcy Iveson-Berkeley	329	7.6	–11.9
Green	Daniel Max Longdon	328	7.6	+1.0
Labour	Jack Finlay Rogan	312	7.3	–20.2
Green	Graham Bentley	299	7.0	+0.4
Southport Community Independents	Frances Davies	103	2.4	N/A
Turnout		12,903		
Registered electors		10,016		
Liberal Democrats hold				
Liberal Democrats hold				
Liberal Democrats hold				

=== Netherton North ===
Netherton North
Party	Candidate	Votes	%
Labour	Joe Johnson	1,169	53.4
Labour	Helen Duerden	1,073	49.0
Labour	Carla Thomas	1,021	46.6
Reform	David Peter Thomas Ashcroft	700	32.0
Reform	David Watson	690	31.5
Reform	Ian David Wales	679	31.0
Green	Benjamin James Crawford	314	14.3
Green	Emily Penman	286	13.1
Green	Joseph Irvine Welsh	263	12.0
Conservative	Gina Campbell	109	5.0
Liberal Democrats	Mary Kenny	103	4.7
TUSC	Conor Anthony O’Neill	84	3.8
Liberal Democrats	Anthony Robertson	77	3.5
Turnout		6,568	
Registered electors		TBC	
Labour win (new seat)			
Labour win (new seat)			
Labour win (new seat)			

=== Netherton South & Orrell ===
Netherton South & Orrell
Party	Candidate	Votes	%
Labour	Chris Hannaway	1,025	44.7
Labour	Tom Spring	943	41.1
Labour	Joanne Williams	935	40.8
Reform	Derek Norman Salisbury	803	35.0
Reform	Ian Stephen Stanton	787	34.3
Reform	Roderick Anthony Rockingham Stringer	737	32.1
Green	Conor Stephen McDonald	404	17.6
Green	Casey Margaret Kenny	403	17.6
Green	Rhys Morgan Lewis	362	15.8
Liberal Democrats	John Griffith	147	6.4
Liberal Democrats	Jennifer Robertson	141	6.1
Liberal Democrats	Bruce Hubbard	119	5.2
Conservative	Andy Roberts	75	3.3
Turnout		6,881	
Registered electors		TBC	
Labour win (new seat)			
Labour win (new seat)			
Labour win (new seat)			

=== Norwood ===
Norwood
Party	Candidate	Votes	%	±%
Reform	John Costello	1,359	34.3	N/A
Reform	Charles Robert Denton	1,306	33.0	N/A
Reform	Thomas Swaney	1,277	32.2	N/A
Green	Jo Barton	1,152	29.1	+17.7
Green	Laurence George Rankin	1,088	27.5	+16.1
Green	Lara Louise Cron	1,059	26.7	+15.3
Labour	Marianne Welsh	779	19.7	–35.6
Labour	Andy Spencer	775	19.6	–35.7
Labour	Ged Wright	718	18.1	–37.2
Liberal Democrats	Peter Blake	545	13.8	–2.3
Liberal Democrats	Peter Latham	500	12.6	–3.5
Liberal Democrats	Roland Zollner	401	10.1	–6.0
Conservative	Pamela Teesdale	332	8.4	–8.8
Conservative	Kelly Ann Barton	317	8.0	–9.2
Conservative	Margaret Eileen Middleton	282	7.1	–10.1
Turnout		11,890		
Registered electors		10,232		
Reform gain from Labour				
Reform gain from Labour				
Reform gain from Labour				

=== Thornton & Hightown ===
Thornton & Hightown
Party	Candidate	Votes	%
Labour	Clare Carragher	1,454	40.2
Labour	Dominic James McNabb	1,409	38.9
Labour	Rosa Battle	1,377	38.0
Reform	Robbie Dale	1,090	30.1
Reform	Ian Francis James Nilsson-Forrest	1,035	28.6
Reform	Steven Charles Williams	1,022	28.2
Green	Simon Baron	639	17.7
Green	Amber-Page Marilyn Moss	589	16.3
Green	Joseph Padraig Kelly	551	15.2
Conservative	Paul Martyn Barber	498	13.8
Conservative	Michael Paul Crichton	380	10.5
Liberal Democrats	John Gibson	362	10.0
Conservative	Cos Zinonos	292	8.1
Liberal Democrats	Adarsh Makdani	163	4.5
Turnout		10,861	
Registered electors		TBC	
Labour win (new seat)			
Labour win (new seat)			
Labour win (new seat)			

=== Waterloo ===
Waterloo
Party	Candidate	Votes	%
Green	Neil Anthony Doolin	1,947	53.4
Green	Samantha Lauren Cook	1,842	50.5
Green	Kieran Dams	1,692	46.4
Labour	Jane Skinner	1,184	32.5
Labour	Mike Dormer	1,146	31.4
Labour	Steven McArdle	1,066	29.2
Reform	Andy Bray	671	18.4
Reform	Alan Gibney	630	17.3
Reform	Joseph Stanton	585	16.0
Conservative	Nigel Stuart Barber	175	4.8
Turnout		10,938	
Registered electors		TBC	
Green win (new seat)			
Green win (new seat)			
Green win (new seat)			

== Post-election changes ==
=== Netherton North ===
Netherton North by-election: 10 December 2026
Party	Candidate	Votes	%	±%
Conservative	Katie Burgess			
Labour	Finvola Dunphy			
Independent	Amber-Page Moss			
TUSC	Conor O'Neill			
Independent	Ian Smith			
Reform	David Watson			
Majority				
Turnout				
		Swing		
