= 2022 Sefton Metropolitan Borough Council election =

2022 UK local government election

Results of the 2022 Sefton Metropolitan Borough Council election

The 2022 Sefton Metropolitan Borough Council election took place on 5 May 2022 to elect members of Sefton Council. This was on the same day as other local elections. 21 of the 66 seats were up for election, with 1 ward (St. Oswald) being uncontested.

== Background ==
From its creation in 1974 to the 1986 election, Sefton Council was under Conservative control. It was then under no overall control until the 2012 election, when Labour won their first majority on the council. In the 2021 election, Labour polled 46.6% and gained 6 seats, the Conservatives polled 26.0% for a gain of 2 seats, The Liberal Democrats took 14.1% and lost 5 seats, Formby Residents Action Group polled 2.2% and did not make any gains, and independents lost their 3 seats on the council.

The seats up for election this year were last elected in 2018. In that election, Labour gained 3 seats with 50.9% of the vote, the Liberal Democrats lost 4 seats on 16.0%, and the Conservatives gained 1 seat on 22.8%. Formby Residents Action Group lost the seat they were defending.

== Previous council composition ==
| After 2021 election | | Before 2022 election | |
| Party | Seats | Party | Seats |
|---|---|---|---|
| Labour | 48 | Labour | 46 |
| Liberal Democrats | 8 | Liberal Democrats | 8 |
| Conservative | 8 | Conservative | 8 |
| Formby Residents Action Group | 2 | Formby Residents Action Group | 2 |
| Independent | 0 | Independent | 2 |

Changes:

- May 2021: Tony Carr leaves Labour to sit as an independent
- Andrew Wilson leaves Labour to sit as an independent

== Results ==
2022 Sefton Metropolitan Borough Council election
| Party | This election | | | Full council | | | This election | | |
| Party | Seats | Net | Seats % | Other | Total | Total % | Votes | Votes % | +/− |
|---|---|---|---|---|---|---|---|---|---|
| Labour | 17 | ▲2 | 77.3 | 31 | 48 | 72.7 | 32,371 | 49.3 | +2.7 |
| Liberal Democrats | 2 | Steady | 9.1 | 6 | 8 | 12.1 | 10,000 | 15.2 | +1.1 |
| Conservative | 3 | ▼1 | 13.6 | 4 | 7 | 10.6 | 13,296 | 20.2 | -5.8 |
| FRAG | 0 | Steady | 0.0 | 2 | 2 | 3.0 | 973 | 1.5 | -0.7 |
| Independent | 0 | ▼1 | 0.0 | 1 | 1 | 1.5 | 5,725 | 8.7 | +5.0 |
| Green | 0 | Steady | 0.0 | 0 | 0 | 0.0 | 3,119 | 4.7 | -2.3 |
| Workers Party | 0 | Steady | 0.0 | 0 | 0 | 0.0 | 142 | 0.2 | +0.1 |
| NIP | 0 | Steady | 0.0 | 0 | 0 | 0.0 | 97 | 0.1 | N/A |

== Results by ward ==
An asterisk indicates an incumbent councillor.

=== Ainsdale ===
Ainsdale
| Party | Candidate | Votes | % | ±% |
|---|---|---|---|---|
| Conservative | Tony Brough* | 1,387 | 33.0 | +2.1 |
| Labour | Janet Harrison | 1,354 | 32.2 | +12.8 |
| Liberal Democrats | Lesley Delves | 1,272 | 30.3 | −14.2 |
| Green | Laurence Rankin | 189 | 4.5 | −0.7 |
| Majority | | 33 | 0.8 | |
| Turnout | | 4,202 | 41.9 | |
| Conservative hold | | Swing | ▼5.4 | |

=== Birkdale ===
Birkdale
| Party | Candidate | Votes | % | ±% |
|---|---|---|---|---|
| Liberal Democrats | Iain Brodie-Browne* | 1,518 | 43.4 | +14.1 |
| Labour | Daniel McKee | 1,093 | 31.2 | −1.5 |
| Conservative | Lee Durkin | 697 | 19.9 | −12.1 |
| Green | David Collins | 190 | 5.4 | −0.6 |
| Majority | | 425 | 12.2 | |
| Turnout | | 3,498 | 34.7 | |
| Liberal Democrats hold | | Swing | ▲7.8 | |

=== Blundellsands ===
Blundellsands
| Party | Candidate | Votes | % | ±% |
|---|---|---|---|---|
| Labour | Natasha Carlin* | 2,301 | 66.0 | +16.7 |
| Conservative | Harry Bliss | 791 | 22.7 | −4.8 |
| Liberal Democrats | Brian Dunning | 394 | 11.3 | +4.5 |
| Majority | | 1,510 | 43.3 | |
| Turnout | | 3,486 | 37.6 | |
| Labour hold | | Swing | ▲10.8 | |

=== Cambridge ===
Cambridge
| Party | Candidate | Votes | % | ±% |
|---|---|---|---|---|
| Conservative | Mike Morris* | 1,338 | 37.9 | −3.7 |
| Liberal Democrats | Michael Sammon | 1,313 | 37.2 | +1.7 |
| Labour | Ian Upton | 678 | 19.2 | +2.2 |
| Green | Carla Fox | 197 | 5.6 | −0.3 |
| Majority | | 25 | 0.7 | |
| Turnout | | 3,526 | 36.1 | |
| Conservative hold | | Swing | ▼2.7 | |

=== Church ===
Church
| Party | Candidate | Votes | % | ±% |
|---|---|---|---|---|
| Labour | Daren Veidman* | 1,850 | 64.5 | +0.8 |
| Green | Neil Doolin | 862 | 30.1 | +9.0 |
| Conservative | John Campbell | 155 | 5.4 | −5.9 |
| Majority | | 988 | 34.7 | −8.0 |
| Turnout | | 2,867 | 31.3 | |
| Labour hold | | Swing | ▼4.1 | |

=== Derby ===
Derby
| Party | Candidate | Votes | % | ±% |
|---|---|---|---|---|
| Labour | Brenda O'Brien* | 1,757 | 82.6 | +18.5 |
| Independent | John McDonald | 204 | 9.6 | N/A |
| Conservative | Daniel Nuttall | 165 | 7.8 | +0.1 |
| Majority | | 1,553 | 73.0 | |
| Turnout | | 2,126 | 23.6 | |
| Labour hold | | Swing | N/A | |

=== Duke's ===
Duke's
| Party | Candidate | Votes | % | ±% |
|---|---|---|---|---|
| Conservative | Ron Watson* | 1,479 | 41.9 | +0.1 |
| Liberal Democrats | Jo Barton | 1,224 | 34.7 | +18.6 |
| Labour | Trevor Vaughan | 824 | 23.4 | +8.8 |
| Majority | | 255 | 7.2 | |
| Turnout | | 3,527 | 33.7 | |
| Conservative hold | | Swing | ▼9.3 | |

=== Ford ===
Ford
| Party | Candidate | Votes | % | ±% |
|---|---|---|---|---|
| Labour | Elizabeth Dowd* | 1,452 | 66.5 | +3.1 |
| Independent | Chris Doyle | 534 | 24.5 | N/A |
| Conservative | Margaret Middleton | 114 | 5.2 | −3.3 |
| Workers Party | Chris Haws | 84 | 3.8 | −0.8 |
| Majority | | 918 | 42.0 | |
| Turnout | | 2,184 | 23.5 | |
| Labour hold | | Swing | N/A | |

=== Harington ===
Harington
| Party | Candidate | Votes | % | ±% |
|---|---|---|---|---|
| Labour | Carol Richards | 1,544 | 40.3 | +7.0 |
| Conservative | Denise Dutton* | 1,482 | 38.7 | −4.1 |
| FRAG | Aimee Brodie | 329 | 8.6 | −2.5 |
| Liberal Democrats | Annie Gorski | 257 | 6.7 | +2.4 |
| Green | Michael Walsh | 221 | 5.8 | −1.6 |
| Majority | | 62 | 1.6 | |
| Turnout | | 3,833 | 39.2 | |
| Labour gain from Conservative | | Swing | ▲5.6 | |

=== Kew ===
Kew
| Party | Candidate | Votes | % | ±% |
|---|---|---|---|---|
| Labour | Laura Lunn-Bates | 1,563 | 50.1 | +13.5 |
| Conservative | Laura Nuttall | 842 | 27.0 | −3.7 |
| Liberal Democrats | Vic Foulds | 715 | 22.9 | −3.1 |
| Majority | | 721 | 23.1 | |
| Turnout | | 3,120 | 30.0 | |
| Labour hold | | Swing | ▲8.6 | |

=== Linacre ===
Linacre
| Party | Candidate | Votes | % | ±% |
|---|---|---|---|---|
| Labour | Gordon Friel* | 1,320 | 76.2 | −12.6 |
| Independent | Lisa Ford | 299 | 17.3 | N/A |
| Conservative | Lynne Bold | 114 | 6.6 | −4.6 |
| Majority | | 1,021 | 58.9 | |
| Turnout | | 1,733 | 19.5 | |
| Labour hold | | Swing | N/A | |

=== Litherland ===
Litherland
| Party | Candidate | Votes | % | ±% |
|---|---|---|---|---|
| Labour | John Kelly* | 1,703 | 77.2 | +13.4 |
| Independent | Molli Cooke | 285 | 12.9 | N/A |
| Conservative | Stephen Witham | 121 | 5.5 | −1.1 |
| NIP | Billie Gibson | 97 | 4.4 | N/A |
| Majority | | 1,418 | 64.3 | |
| Turnout | | 2,206 | 24.7 | |
| Labour hold | | Swing | N/A | |

=== Manor ===
Manor
| Party | Candidate | Votes | % | ±% |
|---|---|---|---|---|
| Labour | James McGinnity | 1,818 | 59.1 | +11.3 |
| Conservative | Janice Blanchard | 669 | 21.7 | −10.1 |
| Liberal Democrats | John Gibson | 343 | 11.1 | +1.2 |
| Green | James O'Keefe | 248 | 8.1 | −2.4 |
| Majority | | 1,149 | 37.4 | |
| Turnout | | 3,078 | 31.1 | |
| Labour hold | | Swing | ▲10.7 | |

=== Meols ===
Meols
| Party | Candidate | Votes | % | ±% |
|---|---|---|---|---|
| Liberal Democrats | Gareth Lloyd-Johnson | 1,326 | 37.0 | −11.0 |
| Conservative | Thomas de Freitas | 1,203 | 33.6 | +2.1 |
| Labour | Stephen Jowett | 839 | 23.4 | +10.1 |
| Green | Pauline Hesketh | 211 | 5.9 | −1.3 |
| Majority | | 123 | 3.4 | |
| Turnout | | 3,579 | 36.1 | |
| Liberal Democrats hold | | Swing | ▼6.6 | |

=== Molyneux ===
Molyneux
| Party | Candidate | Votes | % | ±% |
|---|---|---|---|---|
| Labour | Danny Burns | 1,900 | 60.3 | −6.4 |
| Independent | Tony Carr* | 976 | 31.0 | N/A |
| Conservative | Marcus Bleasdale | 274 | 8.7 | −10.0 |
| Majority | | 924 | 29.3 | |
| Turnout | | 3,150 | 31.1 | |
| Labour gain from Independent | | Swing | N/A | |

Tony Carr was elected in 2018 for the Labour Party.

=== Netherton and Orrell ===
Netherton and Orrell
| Party | Candidate | Votes | % | ±% |
|---|---|---|---|---|
| Labour | Ian Maher* | 1,739 | 72.8 | −2.4 |
| Independent | John Rice | 473 | 19.8 | N/A |
| Conservative | Andrew Burgess | 177 | 7.4 | −3.1 |
| Majority | | 1,266 | 53.0 | |
| Turnout | | 2,389 | 24.7 | |
| Labour hold | | Swing | N/A | |

=== Norwood ===
Norwood
| Party | Candidate | Votes | % | ±% |
|---|---|---|---|---|
| Labour | Mhairi Doyle* | 1,734 | 55.9 | +12.2 |
| Conservative | Pam Teesdale | 672 | 21.7 | −6.3 |
| Liberal Democrats | Stuart Williams | 452 | 14.6 | −6.2 |
| Green | David McIntosh | 244 | 7.9 | +0.4 |
| Majority | | 1,062 | 34.2 | |
| Turnout | | 3,102 | 30.0 | |
| Labour hold | | Swing | ▲9.3 | |

=== Park ===
Park
| Party | Candidate | Votes | % | ±% |
|---|---|---|---|---|
| Labour | June Burns* | 1,510 | 45.1 | −8.8 |
| Independent | Neil Spencer | 723 | 21.6 | N/A |
| Independent | Kenneth Hughes | 462 | 13.8 | N/A |
| Conservative | Daniel Sims | 409 | 12.2 | −22.5 |
| Green | Roy Greason | 244 | 7.3 | −4.1 |
| Majority | | 787 | 23.5 | |
| Turnout | | 3,348 | 34.3 | |
| Labour hold | | Swing | N/A | |

=== Ravenmeols ===
Ravenmeols
| Party | Candidate | Votes | % | ±% |
|---|---|---|---|---|
| Labour | Nina Killen* | 1,766 | 52.5 | +13.9 |
| Conservative | Michael Shaw | 660 | 19.6 | −3.5 |
| FRAG | Bob McCann | 644 | 19.1 | −11.2 |
| Green | Alison Gibbon | 294 | 8.7 | +3.1 |
| Majority | | 1,106 | 32.9 | |
| Turnout | | 3,364 | 35.2 | |
| Labour hold | | Swing | ▲8.7 | |

=== St. Oswald ===
St. Oswald
| Party | Candidate | Votes | % | ±% |
|---|---|---|---|---|
| Labour | Carla Thomas* | N/A | N/A | N/A |
| Majority | | N/A | N/A | N/A |
| Turnout | | N/A | N/A | N/A |

This election was uncontested, so the poll was cancelled and Thomas was declared elected.

=== Sudell ===
Sudell
| Party | Candidate | Votes | % | ±% |
|---|---|---|---|---|
| Labour | Judy Hardman | 1,329 | 37.0 | −13.6 |
| Independent | Yvonne Sayers | 1,065 | 29.6 | N/A |
| Independent | Thomas Hughes | 704 | 19.6 | N/A |
| Conservative | Morgan Walton | 283 | 7.9 | −28.2 |
| Liberal Democrats | Emily Baker | 157 | 4.4 | N/A |
| Workers Party | Paul McCord | 58 | 1.6 | −4.4 |
| Majority | | 264 | 7.4 | |
| Turnout | | 3,596 | 34.7 | |
| Labour hold | | Swing | N/A | |

=== Victoria ===
Victoria
| Party | Candidate | Votes | % | ±% |
|---|---|---|---|---|
| Labour | Janet Grace* | 2,297 | 60.3 | +7.3 |
| Liberal Democrats | Hannah Gee | 1,029 | 27.0 | −1.2 |
| Conservative | Katie Burgess | 264 | 6.9 | −4.0 |
| Green | Samantha Cook | 219 | 5.7 | −2.2 |
| Majority | | 1,268 | 33.3 | |
| Turnout | | 3,809 | 36.1 | |
| Labour hold | | Swing | ▲4.3 | |
