= Netherton and Orrell =

Electoral ward in Merseyside, England

Coordinates: 53.47672°N 2.96728°W

Netherton and Orrell is a Metropolitan Borough of Sefton ward in the Bootle Parliamentary constituency that covers the southern part of the locality of Netherton, and all of the area of Orrell. The population of this ward taken at the 2011 census was 12,653.

== Councillors ==
| Term | Councillor | Party |
|---|---|---|
| 2022–Present | Tom Spring | Labour Party |
| 1996–Present | Ian Maher | Labour Party |
| 2008–Present | Susan Bradshaw | Labour Party |

== Election results ==
=== Elections of the 2010s ===
Sefton Metropolitan Borough Council Municipal Elections 2011: Netherton and Orrell
| Party | Candidate | Votes | % | ±% |
|---|---|---|---|---|
| Labour | Cllr Mrs Susan Bradshaw | 2206 | 75% | |
| UKIP | Pat Gaskell | 271 | 9% | |
| Conservative | Michael McGrady | 200 | 7% | |
| TUSC | Peter Glover | 181 | 6% | |
| Liberal Democrats | Carol Ann Hill | 97 | 3% | |
| Majority | | | | |
| Turnout | | 2955 | 34% | |
| Labour hold | | Swing | | |

Sefton Metropolitan Borough Council Municipal Elections 2010: Netherton and Orrell
| Party | Candidate | Votes | % | ±% |
|---|---|---|---|---|
| Labour | Ian Maher | 3430 | 66% | |
| Liberal Democrats | Nicola Jane Smith | 670 | 13% | |
| UKIP | Pat Gaskell | 409 | 8% | |
| Conservative | Paul Martyn Barber | 371 | 7% | |
| TUSC | Peter Glover | 311 | 6% | |
| Majority | | | | |
| Turnout | | 5191 | 58% | |
| Labour hold | | Swing | | |
