= 2018 Sefton Metropolitan Borough Council election =

← 2016	3 May 2018	2019 →

23 of 66 seats (One Third) to Sefton Metropolitan Borough Council 34 seats needed for a majority

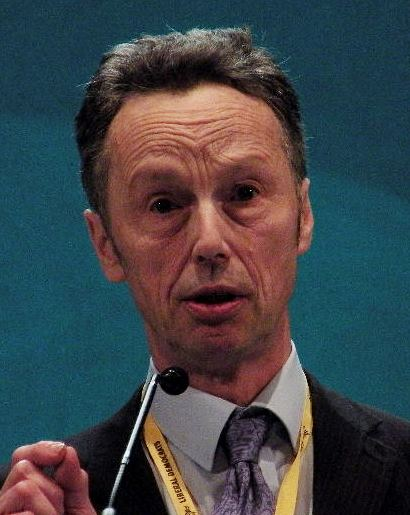

	First party	Second party
Leader	Ian Maher	John Pugh
Party	Labour	Liberal Democrats
Leader's seat	Netherton and Orrell	Dukes
Last election	12 seats, 44.9%	7 seats, 17.6%
Seats before	40	16
Seats won	17	2
Seats after	43	12
Seat change	▲3	▼4
Popular vote	34,241	10,750
Percentage	50.9%	16.0%
Swing	▲6.0%	▼1.6%
	Third party
Leader	Denise Dutton
Party	Conservative
Leader's seat	Harington
Last election	1 seat, 15.9%
Seats before	6
Seats won	4
Seats after	8
Seat change	▲2
Popular vote	15,324
Percentage	22.8%
Swing	▲6.9%
- Map of results of 2018 election
Council Control before election
Ian Maher
Labour
Council control after election
Ian Maher
Labour

The 2018 Sefton Metropolitan Borough Council election took place on 3 May 2018 to elect members of Sefton Metropolitan Borough Council in England. It was held on the same day as other local elections.

Labour retained control of the council with an increased majority, winning an additional three seats and winning their first seats in Southport. The Liberal Democrats led by former MP for Southport John Pugh, lost four seats in total whilst the Conservatives gained seats in the wards of Cambridge and Ainsdale.

== Ward results ==
=== Ainsdale ===
Ainsdale
Party	Candidate	Votes	%	±%
Conservative	Tony Brough	1,891	45.9	▲16.8
Labour Co-op	Frank Hanley	1084	26.3	▲15.2
Liberal Democrats	Jude Storer	935	22.8	▼7.0
Green	Barbara Dutton	118	2.9	▼2.3
UKIP	Peter Forder	95	2.3	▼22.5
Majority		807	19.6	
Turnout		4123	40.7	
Conservative gain from Liberal Democrats		Swing	▲26.5	

=== Birkdale ===
Birkdale
Party	Candidate	Votes	%	±%
Liberal Democrats	Iain Brodie Browne	1,249	38.3	▼2.7
Labour	Daniel Burns	982	30.1	▲15.7
Conservative	Jacky Bliss	806	24.7	▲11.2
Green	David Collins	121	3.7	▲1.2
UKIP	Derek Tasker	101	3.1	▼23.0
Majority		267	8.2	
Turnout		4123	40.7	
Liberal Democrats hold		Swing	▼9.2	

=== Blundellsands ===
Blundellsands
Party	Candidate	Votes	%	±%
Labour	Sam Marshall	2,027	55.9	▲12.2
Conservative	Wendy Moore	1166	32.2	▲0.4
Liberal Democrats	Brian Dunning	269	7.4	▲3.2
Green	Alison Gibbon	164	4.5	▼1.3
Majority		861	8.2	
Turnout		3626	38.4	
Labour hold		Swing	▲6.3	

=== Cambridge ===
Cambridge
Party	Candidate	Votes	%	±%
Conservative	Mike Morris	1,258	36.6	▲15.8
Liberal Democrats	Leo Evans	1192	34.7	▼5.7
Labour	Stephen Jowett	757	22.0	▲12.1
UKIP	Terry Durrance	123	3.6	▼22.1
Green	Carla Fox	110	3.2	▲0.1
Majority		66	1.9	
Turnout		3440	33.6	
Conservative gain from Liberal Democrats		Swing	▲10.8	

=== Church ===
Church
Party	Candidate	Votes	%	±%
Labour	Daren Veidman	2,018	76.9	▲18.7
Conservative	Anne Clegg	271	10.3	▼10.1
Green	Laurence Rankin	237	9.0	▼0.5
Liberal Democrats	Frances Eaton	99	3.8	▼0.9
Majority		1747	66.6	
Turnout		2625	28.3	
Labour hold		Swing	▲14.5	

=== Derby ===
Derby
Party	Candidate	Votes	%	±%
Labour	Mike O'Brien	1,834	87.7	▲15.6
Conservative	David Bright	163	7.8	▲4.4
Liberal Democrats	Andrew Tonkiss	94	4.5	N/A
Majority		1671	79.9	
Turnout		2091	22.9	
Labour hold		Swing	▲10.0	

=== Dukes ===
Dukes
Party	Candidate	Votes	%	±%
Conservative	Sir Ron Watson	1,409	40.1	▲10.9
Liberal Democrats	Jo Barton	1275	36.3	▲10.9
Labour	Sahar Dehghani-Barenji	710	20.2	▲3.5
Green	Nick Senior	118	3.4	▼1.0
Majority		134	3.8	
Turnout		3512	32.7	
Conservative hold		Swing	▲10.9	

=== Ford ===
Ford (2)
Party	Candidate	Votes	%	±%
Labour	Liz Dowd	1,665	77.0	+0.8
Labour	Ian Moncur	1,659	76.7	+0.5
Conservative	Lynne Bold	181	8.4	+4.5
Green	Roy Greason	163	7.5	+1.8
Conservative	Pamela Teesdale	139	6.4	+2.5
Liberal Democrats	Adarsh Makdani	77	3.6	N/A
Liberal Democrats	Carol Tonkiss	73	3.4	N/A
Majority		1032	37.0	
Turnout		3957	42.5	
Labour hold		Swing		

=== Harington ===
Harington
Party	Candidate	Votes	%	±%
Conservative	Denise Dutton	1,820	46.0	▲3.0
Labour	Carol Richards	1363	35.0	▲8.0
Formby Residents Action Group	Derek Baxter	578	15.0	N/A
Liberal Democrats	Keith Cawdron	174	4.0	Steady
Majority		457	12.0	
Turnout		3935	39.6	
Conservative hold		Swing		

=== Kew ===
Kew
Party	Candidate	Votes	%	±%
Labour	Janis Blackburne	1,448	44.8	▲26.0
Liberal Democrats	Fred Weavers	1012	31.3	▼3.0
Conservative	Margaret Middleton	563	17.4	▲4.7
UKIP	Linda Gunn-Rosso	128	4.0	▼24.4
Green	Robert Doyle	80	2.5	▼2.7
Majority		436	13.5	
Turnout		3231	32.5	
Labour gain from Liberal Democrats		Swing	▲14.5	

=== Litherland ===
Litherland
Party	Candidate	Votes	%	±%
Labour	John Kelly	1,851	84.0	▲11.0
Conservative	Jessamine Hounslea	192	9.0	▼6.0
Green	Ethan Wykes	148	7.0	N/A
Majority		1659	76.0	
Turnout		2191	24.7	
Labour hold		Swing		

=== Manor ===
Manor
Party	Candidate	Votes	%	±%
Labour	Steve McGinnity	1,789	57.0	▲14.0
Conservative	Janice Blanchard	852	27.0	▲1.0
Liberal Democrats	John Gibson	333	11.0	▲7.0
Green	Michael Walsh	143	5.0	▼2.0
Majority		937	30.0	
Turnout		3117	31.1	
Labour hold		Swing		

=== Meols ===
Meols
Party	Candidate	Votes	%	±%
Liberal Democrats	Daniel Lewis	1,466	41.7	▲8.2
Conservative	Jordan Shandley	1141	32.5	▲14.5
Labour	Janet Harrison	789	22.5	▲13.0
Green	Alwynne Cartmell	118	3.4	▲0.1
Majority		325	9.2	▼6.4
Turnout		3514	34.8	▲2.3
Liberal Democrats hold		Swing	▼3.2	

=== Molyneux ===
Molyneux
Party	Candidate	Votes	%	±%
Labour	Anthony Carr	1,736	61.0	▲6.0
Independent	Jack Colbert	440	15.0	N/A
Conservative	Marcus Bleasdale	327	11.0	Steady
UKIP	Peter Harper	151	5.0	▼23.0
Green	Mike Carter	103	4.0	▼2.0
Liberal Democrats	Terry Doyle	99	3.0	N/A
Majority		1296	46.0	
Turnout		2856	28.0	
Labour hold		Swing		

=== Netherton & Orrell ===
Netherton & Orrell
Party	Candidate	Votes	%	±%
Labour	Ian Maher	1,976	82.0	▲18.0
Conservative	Paul Anthony Huckstepp	182	8.0	▲2.0
UKIP	Pat Gaskell	121	5.0	▼16.0
Green	Maureen Grainger	118	5.0	N/A
Majority		1794	75.0	▲32%
Turnout		2397	24.9	
Labour hold		Swing		

=== Norwood ===
Norwood
Party	Candidate	Votes	%	±%
Labour	Mhairi Doyle	1,779	49.0	▲30.0
Liberal Democrats	Peter Blake	1122	31.0	▼2.0
Conservative	Michael Shaw	506	14.0	▲4.0
Green	David McIntosh	122	3.0	▼2.0
UKIP	Peter Gregson	81	2.0	▼21.0
Majority		657	18.0	
Turnout		3610	34.5	
Labour gain from Liberal Democrats		Swing		

=== Park ===
Park
Party	Candidate	Votes	%	±%
Labour	June Burns	1,611	51.0	▲8.0
Independent	John Short	744	24.0	N/A
Conservative	Kenneth Hughes	534	17.0	▲4.0
Liberal Democrats	Jen Robertson	241	8.0	▼10.0
Majority		867	27.0	
Turnout		3130	31.8	
Labour hold		Swing		

=== Ravenmeols ===
Ravenmeols
Party	Candidate	Votes	%	±%
Labour	Nina Killen	1,551	41.0	▲13.0
Formby Residents Action Group	Maria Bennett	1288	34.0	▼7.0
Conservative	Gemma Peace	781	21.0	▲3.0
Liberal Democrats	Mark Senior	159	4.0	N/A
Majority		263	7.0	
Turnout		3779	39.1	
Labour gain from Formby Residents Action Group		Swing		

=== St Oswald ===
St Oswald
Party	Candidate	Votes	%	±%
Labour	Carla Thomas	1,721	84.0	▲10.0
Conservative	Peter Papworth	218	11.0	▲7.0
Socialist Labour	Kim Bryan	119	6.0	▲3.0
Majority		1693	73.0	
Turnout		2058	24.4	
Labour hold		Swing		

=== Sudell ===
Sudell
Party	Candidate	Votes	%	±%
Labour	Yvonne Sayers	1,645	53.0	▲8.0
Independent	Michael O'Hanlon	691	22.0	N/A
Conservative	Thomas Hughes	488	16.0	▲6.0
Liberal Democrats	Stuart Mason	214	7.0	▼15.0
Green	Marion Wykes	70	2.0	▼2.0
Majority		954	31.0	
Turnout		3450	34.7	
Labour hold		Swing		

=== Victoria ===
Victoria
Party	Candidate	Votes	%	±%
Labour	Janet Grace	2,369	65.0	▲20.0
Liberal Democrats	Hannah Gee	665	18.0	▼4.0
Conservative	Paul Barber	469	13.0	▲4.0
Green	Andrew Donegan	163	4.0	▼3.0
Majority		1704	47.0	
Turnout		3799	37.5	
Labour hold		Swing		
