= 2019 Sefton Metropolitan Borough Council election =

- 2 May 2019

23 of 66 seats (One Third) to Sefton Metropolitan Borough Council 34 seats needed for a majority

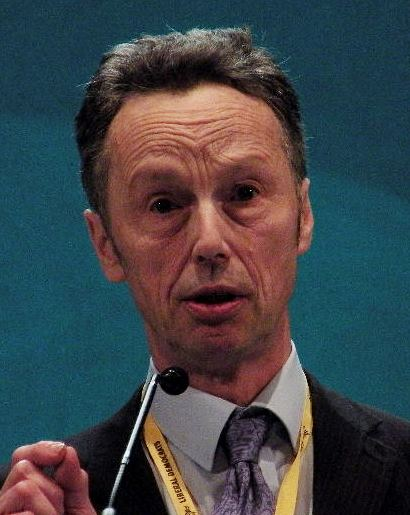

	First party	Second party
Leader	Ian Maher	John Pugh
Party	Labour	Liberal Democrats
Leader's seat	Netherton and Orrell	Dukes
Last election	12 seats, 44.9%	seats,
Seats before	43	12
Seat change	▲3	▼
Swing	▲	▼
	Third party
Leader	Denise Dutton
Party	Conservative
Leader's seat	Harington
Last election	1 seat, 15.9%
Seats before	8
Seat change	▲
Swing	▲
- Map of the results, including the by-election in Norwood
Council Control before election
Ian Maher
Labour
Council control after election
Ian Maher
Labour

The 2019 Sefton Metropolitan Borough Council election took place on 2 May 2019 to elect members of Sefton Metropolitan Borough Council in England. It was held on the same day as other local elections.

== Ward results ==
=== Ainsdale ===
Ainsdale
Party	Candidate	Votes	%	±%
Conservative	Terry Jones *	1,257	33.2	
Labour	Kevin Donnellon	944	25.0	
Liberal Democrats	Anne Leslie Corbishley	907	24.0	
UKIP	Derek Samuel Tasker	431	11.4	
Green	Barbara Ann Dutton	246	6.5	
Majority		313		
Registered electors		10,200		
Rejected ballots		14		
Turnout		3,785	37.25	
Conservative hold		Swing		

=== Birkdale ===
Birkdale
Party	Candidate	Votes	%	±%
Liberal Democrats	Simon Shaw *	1,710	47.8	
Labour	Danny Burns	900	25.1	
Conservative	Thomas Andrew de Freitas	370	10.3	
UKIP	Linda Julia Ann Gunn-Russo	311	8.7	
Green	David William Collins	288	8.1	
Majority		810		
Registered electors		10,237		
Rejected ballots		17		
Turnout		3,579	35.13	
Liberal Democrats hold		Swing		

=== Blundellsands ===
Blundellsands
Party	Candidate	Votes	%	±%
Labour	Christine Catherine Howard	1,721	48.5	
Conservative	Martyn Paul Barber	931	26.2	
Green	Alison Moira Gibbon	390	11.0	
Liberal Democrats	Brian Frederick Dunning	323	9.1	
UKIP	Kevin John Stanton	187	5.3	
Majority		790		
Registered electors		9,446		
Rejected ballots		25		
Turnout		3,552	37.9	
Labour hold		Swing		

=== Cambridge ===
Cambridge
Party	Candidate	Votes	%	±%
Liberal Democrats	Leo Francis Evans	1,398	41.0	
Conservative	Harry Bliss *	962	28.0	
UKIP	Terry Durrance	492	14.5	
Labour	James Joseph Hansen	381	11.3	
Green	Nicholas John Senior	154	4.6	
Majority		436		
Registered electors		10,296		
Rejected ballots		18		
Turnout		3,387	33.1	
Liberal Democrats gain from Conservative		Swing		

=== Church ===
Church
Party	Candidate	Votes	%	±%
Labour	Veronica Webster *	1,560	62.4	
Green	Mike Carter	550	22.0	
Liberal Democrats	Les Ashton	195	7.8	
Conservative	Lynne Margaret Bold	194	7.8	
Majority		1,010		
Registered electors		9,389		
Rejected ballots		42		
Turnout		2,499	27.1	
Labour hold		Swing		

=== Derby ===
Derby
Party	Candidate	Votes	%	±%
Labour	Dave Robinson *	1,627	85.0	
Conservative	Daniel Paul Nuttall	146	7.6	
Liberal Democrats	Ardash Makdani	141	7.4	
Majority		1,481		
Registered electors		9,142		
Rejected ballots		52		
Turnout		1,914	21.5	
Labour hold		Swing		

=== Dukes ===
Dukes
Party	Candidate	Votes	%	±%
Liberal Democrats	John Pugh *	1,729	49.2	
Conservative	Adam Charles Edward Kennaugh	797	22.7	
Labour	Lesley Delves	511	14.5	
UKIP	Al Johnson	285	8.1	
Green	Robert Michael Doyle	194	5.5	
Majority		932		
Registered electors		10,890		
Rejected ballots		17		
Turnout		3,516	32.4	
Liberal Democrats hold		Swing		

=== Ford ===
Ford
Party	Candidate	Votes	%	±%
Labour	Ian Moncur *	1,463	75.7	
Green	Samantha Cook	242	12.5	
Conservative	Veronica Dorgan	138	7.1	
Liberal Democrats	Annie Gorski	91	4.7	
Majority		1,221		
Registered electors		9,408		
Rejected ballots		30		
Turnout		1,934	20.9	
Labour hold		Swing		

=== Harington ===
Harington
Party	Candidate	Votes	%	±%
Formby Residents Action Group	David Irving	1,279	33.4	
Labour	Carol Richards	1,112	29.0	
Conservative	Simon Jamieson *	967	25.2	
Liberal Democrats	Keith Cawdron	276	7.2	
UKIP	Margaret Ann Hennessy	199	5.2	
Majority		167		
Registered electors		9,884		
Rejected ballots		24		
Turnout		3,833	39.0	
Formby Residents Action Group gain from Conservative				

=== Kew ===
Kew
Party	Candidate	Votes	%	±%
Labour	Sean Robert Halsall	1,124	37.1	
Liberal Democrats	Jo Barton	791	26.1	
UKIP	Sarah Elizabeth Howard	454	15.0	
Conservative	Margaret Eileen Middleton	446	14.7	
Green	Emma Elizabeth Gillinder	212	7.0	
Majority		333		
Registered electors		10,064		
Rejected ballots		21		
Turnout		3,027	30.8	
Labour gain from Liberal Democrats		Swing		

=== Linacre ===
Linacre
Party	Candidate	Votes	%	±%
Labour	John Fairclough *	1,177	68.5	
Independent	Michael James Brennan	270	15.7	
Liberal Democrats	Jennifer Robertson	106	6.2	
Conservative	Sean Anthony Dorgan	100	5.8	
Socialist Labour	Barbara Ann Bryan	65	3.8	
Majority		907		
Registered electors		9,010		
Rejected ballots		31		
Turnout		1,718	19.4	
Labour hold		Swing		

=== Litherland ===
Litherland
Party	Candidate	Votes	%	±%
Labour	Paul Tweed *	1,659	82.7	
Liberal Democrats	Mike Sammon	192	9.6	
Conservative	Jessamine Miles Hounslea	55	7.7	
Majority		1,553		
Registered electors		8,908		
Rejected ballots		47		
Turnout		2,006	23.0	
Labour hold		Swing		

=== Manor ===
Manor
Party	Candidate	Votes	%	±%
Labour	Clare Louise Carragher *	1,447	49.1	
Conservative	Janice Blanchard	631	21.4	
Liberal Democrats	John Gibson	507	17.2	
Green	James O'Keeffe	362	12.3	
Majority		816		
Registered electors		9,975		
Rejected ballots		47		
Turnout		2,947	30.0	
Labour hold		Swing		

=== Meols ===
Meols
Party	Candidate	Votes	%	±%
Liberal Democrats	Yaso Sathiy	1,948	54.7	
Conservative	Jonathan Peter Butler	608	17.1	
Labour	Stephen James Jowett	536	15.1	
UKIP	Peter Forder	333	9.4	
Green	Laurence George Rankin	137	3.9	
Majority		1,340		
Registered electors		10,075		
Rejected ballots		11		
Turnout		3,562	35.5	
Liberal Democrats hold		Swing		

=== Molyneux ===
Molyneux
Party	Candidate	Votes	%	±%
Labour	Marion Atkinson *	1,546	57.3	
UKIP	Peter Harper	484	18.0	
Conservative	Mike McGrady	238	8.8	
Liberal Democrats	Andrew John Tonkiss	228	8.5	
Green	Marion Wykes	201	7.5	
Majority		1,062		
Registered electors		10,171		
Rejected ballots		18		
Turnout		2,697	26.7	
Labour hold		Swing		

=== Netherton & Orrell ===
Netherton & Orrell
Party	Candidate	Votes	%	±%
Labour	Susan Bradshaw *	1,670	72.7	
UKIP	Pat Gaskell	255	11.1	
Green	Maureen Grainger	240	10.5	
Conservative	Andrew Joseph Burgess	131	5.7	
Majority		1,415		
Registered electors		9,696		
Rejected ballots		14		
Turnout		2,296	23.8	
Labour hold		Swing		

=== Norwood ===
Norwood - 2 seats
Party	Candidate	Votes	%	±%
Labour	Greg Steven Myers	1,239	36.6	
Labour	Carran Janet Waterfield	1,233	36.4	
Liberal Democrats	Peter Blake	928	27.4	
Liberal Democrats	David Ian Newman	831	24.5	
Conservative	Michael James Shaw	460	13.6	
UKIP	Peter Noel Gregson	416	12.3	
UKIP	Gordon Ferguson	413	12.3	
Green	David Andrew McIntosh	342	10.1	
Conservative	Sinclair Thomas	333	9.8	
Majority		311		
Registered electors		10,495		
Rejected ballots		15		
Turnout		3,385	32.4	
Labour gain from Liberal Democrats		Swing		
Labour gain from Liberal Democrats		Swing		

=== Park ===
Park
Party	Candidate	Votes	%	±%
Labour	John Sayers *	1,300	46.1	
Independent	John Gerard Short	666	23.6	
Conservative	Kenneth Hughes	413	14.7	
Green	Roy Greason	270	9.6	
Liberal Democrats	Shehnaz Somjee	169	6.0	
Majority		634		
Registered electors		9,808		
Rejected ballots		33		
Turnout		2,818	29.1	
Labour hold		Swing		

=== Ravenmeols ===
Ravenmeols
Party	Candidate	Votes	%	±%
Formby Residents Action Group	Maria Bennett	1,341	37.6	
Labour	Catie Page *	1,324	37.1	
Conservative	Siobhan Mulrooney	402	11.3	
UKIP	Stephen Hennessy	181	5.1	
Green	Michael Walsh	175	4.9	
Liberal Democrats	Mark Senior	144	4.0	
Majority		17		
Registered electors		9,622		
Rejected ballots		10		
Turnout		3,567	37.2	
Formby Residents Action Group gain from Labour				

=== St Oswald ===
St Oswald
Party	Candidate	Votes	%	±%
Labour	Paula Spencer	1,351	74.5	
Green	Shaun William Smyth	147	8.1	
Conservative	Angela Helen Rankin	143	7.9	
Liberal Democrats	Paul Young	93	5.1	
Socialist Labour	Kim Bryan	79	4.4	
Majority		1,204		
Registered electors		8,453		
Rejected ballots		22		
Turnout		1,813	21.7	
Labour hold		Swing		

=== Sudell ===
Sudell
Party	Candidate	Votes	%	±%
Labour	Patrick McKinlay *	1,393	47.1	
Independent	Michael O'Hanlon	653	22.1	
Conservative	Thomas Hughes	347	11.7	
Liberal Democrats	Stuart David Mason	216	7.3	
UKIP	Denis Malkin	200	6.8	
Green	Carla Fox	150	5.1	
Majority		740		
Registered electors		10,194		
Rejected ballots		13		
Turnout		2,959	29.2	
Labour hold		Swing		

=== Victoria ===
Victoria
Party	Candidate	Votes	%	±%
Labour	Leslie Byrom C.B.E. *	1,675	48.5	
Liberal Democrats	Hannah Jane Gee	1,003	29.0	
Green	Andrew Roy Donegan	427	12.4	
Conservative	Paul Martyn Barber	351	10.2	
Majority		672		
Registered electors		10,846		
Rejected ballots		45		
Turnout		3,456	32.3	
Labour hold		Swing		
