= 2008 Sefton Metropolitan Borough Council election =

2008 UK local government election

Results of the 2008 Sefton Metropolitan Borough Council election

Elections to Sefton Metropolitan Borough Council were held on 1 May 2008. One third of the council was up for election and the council stayed under no overall control.

== Election result ==
Sefton local election result 2008
Party	Seats	Gains	Losses	Net gain/loss	Seats %	Votes %	Votes	+/−
Liberal Democrats	9	1	0	+1	39.13%	31.04%	21 025	
Labour	8	0	0	0	34.78%	22.98%	15 569	
Conservative	6	0	1	-1	26.09%	34.15%	23 135	
UKIP	0	0	0	0	0.00%	7.22%	4 888	
Southport Party	0	0	0	0	0.00%	1.81%	1 229	
BNP	0	0	0	0	0.00%	1.74%	1 177	
Socialist Alternative	0	0	0	0	0.00%	0.55%	373	
Green	0	0	0	0	0.00%	0.31%	210	
Communist	0	0	0	0	0.00%	0.16%	105	

== Ward results ==
Ainsdale
Party	Candidate	Votes	%	±%
Liberal Democrats	Pauline Collier	986	23.43%	
UKIP	John Leech	168	3.99%	
Conservative	Brenda Porter *	2 903	68.99%	
Labour	Frank Warner	223	5.30%	
Turnout		4 208	43.96%	

Birkdale
Party	Candidate	Votes	%	±%
UKIP	Terry Durance	394	11.51%	
Liberal Democrats	Richard Hands *	1 702	49.74%	
Conservative	Cath Regan	1 105	32.29%	
Labour	Frank Robinson	213	6.22%	
Turnout		3 422	35%	

Blundellsands
Party	Candidate	Votes	%	±%
Liberal Democrats	Kevin Donnellon	578	18.01%	
Labour	Constance McCarthy	731	22.78%	
Conservative	Paula Parry *	1 893	58.99%	
Turnout		3 209	36.2%	

Cambridge
Party	Candidate	Votes	%	±%
Conservative	Thomas Glover *	2 076	49.39%	
Labour	Muriel Langley	229	5.45%	
Liberal Democrats	Aiden McGuire	1 889	44.94%	
Turnout		4 203	45.12%	

Church
Party	Candidate	Votes	%	±%
Conservative	Brian Cook	426	17.23%	
Labour	Paul Cummins *	1 216	49.19%	
Communist	Ian Davis	60	2.43%	
UKIP	Joseph Nugent	315	12.74%	
Liberal Democrats	Carol Tonkiss	448	18.12%	
Turnout		2 472	28.59%	

Derby
Party	Candidate	Votes	%	±%
Labour	Carol Gustafson *	1 030	51.22%	
BNP	Dean McGraine	98	4.87%	
UKIP	Paul Nuttall	763	37.94%	
Conservative	Kenneth Parry	108	5.37%	
Turnout		2 011	23.33%	

Dukes
Party	Candidate	Votes	%	±%
Labour	Cathine Cookson	297	8.31%	
Southport	Harry Forster	497	13.90%	
Conservative	David Pearson *	1 979	55.36%	
Liberal Democrats	Mary Shavaksha	790	22.10%	
Turnout		3 575	37.9%	

Ford
Party	Candidate	Votes	%	±%
Labour	Owen Brady *	1 330	60.78%	
Conservative	Jessamine Hounslea	287	13.12%	
BNP	Michael McDermott	301	13.76%	
UKIP	Phillip Wordley	265	12.11%	
Turnout		2 188	24.21%	

Harington
Party	Candidate	Votes	%	±%
Conservative	Alfred Doran *	2 527	67.80%	
Liberal Democrats	Druscilla Haydon	663	17.79%	
Labour	Maurice Newton	526	14.11%	
Turnout		3 727	38.56%	

Kew
Party	Candidate	Votes	%	±%
Liberal Democrats	Maureen Fearn *	1 404	47.12%	
Labour	Stephen Jowett	203	6.81%	
Southport	John Lee	455	15.27%	
UKIP	Val Pollard	100	3.36%	
Conservative	Anthony White	809	27.15%	
Turnout		2 980	32.99%	

Linacre
Party	Candidate	Votes	%	±%
Conservative	Helen Barber	140	8.45%	
Communist	John Byrne	45	2.72%	
Liberal Democrats	Carol Hill	192	11.59%	
Labour	Doreen Kerrigan *	1 050	63.41%	
UKIP	Robin Thompson	219	13.22%	
Turnout		1 656	21.48%	

Litherland
Party	Candidate	Votes	%	±%
UKIP	John Bryant	458	24.96%	
Labour	Patricia Hardy *	1 078	58.68%	
Conservative	Alex McIvor	288	15.68%	
Turnout		1 837	22.39%	

Manor
Party	Candidate	Votes	%	±%
Liberal Democrats	John Gibson *	1 493	40.54%	
Labour	Paula Gouldbourn	738	20.04%	
Conservative	David McIvor	1 423	38.64%	
Turnout		3 683	37.72%	

Meols
Party	Candidate	Votes	%	±%
Southport	Margaret Brown	277	7.90%	
UKIP	Nigel Cecil	209	5.96%	
Liberal Democrats	John Dodd *	1 714	48.86%	
Labour	Maureen Stoker	168	4.79%	
Conservative	Mike Swift	1 134	32.33%	
Turnout		3 508	35.69%	

Molyneux
Party	Candidate	Votes	%	±%
Labour	Linda Cluskey	536	18.55%	
Conservative	Edwina Cook	463	16.03%	
UKIP	Peter Harper	514	17.79%	
Liberal Democrats	Geoffrey Howe *	1 370	47.42%	
Turnout		2 889	29.07%	

Netherton and Orrell (2)
Party	Candidate	Votes	%	±%
BNP	Jennifer Atherton	213	10.23%	
Conservative	Viv Becker	306	14.69%	
Labour	Susan Bradshaw *	982	47.14%	
Labour	Robert Brennan *	1 036	49.76%	
UKIP	Andrew Dobson	297	14.26%	
UKIP	Pat Gaskell	270	12.96%	
Socialist Alternative	Peter Glover	373	17.91%	
Conservative	Helen Huxley	193	9.27%	
Turnout		2 083	23.65%	

Norwood
Party	Candidate	Votes	%	±%
Conservative	Tony Crabtree	744	23.21%	
Liberal Democrats	Ronnie Fearn *	1 735	54.13%	
BNP	Margaret McEllenborough	184	5.74%	
Labour	Michael Nolan	290	9.05%	
UKIP	Graham Taylor	243	7.58%	
Turnout		3 205	32.4%	

Park
Party	Candidate	Votes	%	±%
Conservative	Martyn Ball	844	25.70%	
Liberal Democrats	Robbie Fenton *	1 805	54.96%	
BNP	Alan Marshman	202	6.15%	
Labour	Sandra Williams	418	12.73%	
Turnout		3 284	33.75%	

Ravenmeols
Party	Candidate	Votes	%	±%
Labour	Paul Flodman	762	23.01%	
Conservative	Barry Griffiths *	1 950	58.88%	
Liberal Democrats	Colin Trollope	384	11.59%	
Green	Richard Willis	210	6.34%	
Turnout		3 312	35.33%	

St Oswald
Party	Candidate	Votes	%	±%
BNP	Carol Atherton	179	9.13%	
Liberal Democrats	Linda Hough	229	11.69%	
UKIP	David Jones	57	2.91%	
Conservative	Doreen MacPherson	215	10.97%	
Labour	James Mahon *	1 269	64.78%	
Turnout		1 959	23.21%	

Sudell
Party	Candidate	Votes	%	±%
UKIP	Linda Harper	306	9.92%	
Conservative	Simon Jamieson	676	21.92%	
Labour	Stephen Kermode	482	15.63%	
Liberal Democrats	Clifford Mainey *	1 614	52.33%	
Turnout		3 084	30.46%	

Victoria
Party	Candidate	Votes	%	±%
Labour	Giles Blundell	762	20.87%	
Liberal Democrats	Anthony Hill *	2 029	55.56%	
Conservative	Sharon Hutchinson	646	17.69%	
UKIP	Mike Kelly	205	5.61%	
Turnout		3 652	35.36%	

Preceded by 2007 Sefton Metropolitan Borough Council election	Sefton local elections	Succeeded by 2010 Sefton Metropolitan Borough Council election
