= 2011 Sefton Metropolitan Borough Council election =

2011 UK local government election

Results of the 2011 Sefton Metropolitan Borough Council election

The 2011 Sefton Metropolitan Borough Council election was held on Thursday 5 May 2011 to elect 22 members to Sefton Council, the same day as other local elections in the United Kingdom. It elected one-third of the council's 66 members to a four-year term. The council remained under no overall control.

== Results summary ==
2011 Sefton Metropolitan Borough Council election
Party	This election			Full council			This election		
Party	Seats	Net	Seats %	Other	Total	Total %	Votes	Votes %	+/−
Labour	12	▲5	54.5	16	28	42.4	36,876	45.3	
Conservative	5	▼1	22.7	10	15	22.7	20,397	25.0	
Liberal Democrats	5	▼4	22.7	18	23	34.8	16,051	19.7	
UKIP	0	Steady	0.0	0	0	0.0	4,203	5.2	
Southport Party	0	Steady	0.0	0	0	0.0	2,373	2.9	
Green	0	Steady	0.0	0	0	0.0	1,031	1.3	
BNP	0	Steady	0.0	0	0	0.0	324	0.4	
TUSC	0	Steady	0.0	0	0	0.0	181	0.2	
English Democrat	0	Steady	0.0	0	0	0.0	55	0.1	

== Ward results ==
=== Ainsdale ===
Ainsdale
Party	Candidate	Votes	%	±%
Conservative	Terry Jones*	2,030	44.4	▼20.1
Liberal Democrats	Lynne Thompson	1,194	26.1	▼1.9
Labour	Stephen Jowett	799	17.5	▲9.9
UKIP	Bryan Leech	318	7.0	New
Green	Lisa Clague	167	3.7	New
BNP	John Bankes	67	1.5	New
Majority		836	18.3	▼18.2
Total valid votes		4,575	47.9	
Turnout			48.2	
Registered electors		9,558		
Conservative hold		Swing	▼9.1	

=== Birkdale ===
Birkdale
Party	Candidate	Votes	%	±%
Liberal Democrats	Simon Shaw*	1,361	33.8	▼14.8
Conservative	Alastair McNair	934	23.2	▼7.7
Labour	Frank Robinson	830	20.6	▲12.4
UKIP	Terry Durrance	520	12.9	▲0.6
Southport Party	Denise Roney	324	8.0	New
BNP	Robert Smith	56	1.4	New
Majority		427	10.6	▼7.1
Total valid votes		4,025	40.8	
Turnout			41.0	
Registered electors		9,870		
Liberal Democrats hold		Swing	▼3.6	

=== Blundellsands ===
Blundellsands
Party	Candidate	Votes	%	±%
Conservative	Peter Papworth*	1,823	43.5	▼14.4
Labour	Ben Winstanley	1,802	43.0	▲20.9
Liberal Democrats	Carol Tonkiss	281	6.7	▼13.3
Green	Laurence Rankin	280	6.7	New
Majority		21	0.5	▼35.8
Total valid votes		4,186	47.2	
Turnout			47.4	
Registered electors		8,877		
Conservative hold		Swing	▼17.7	

=== Cambridge ===
Cambridge
Party	Candidate	Votes	%	±%
Conservative	Tony Crabtree	1,339	32.3	▼5.1
Liberal Democrats	Lauren Keith	1,323	31.9	▼15.1
Labour	Andy Dams	737	17.8	▲13.0
Southport Party	Stuart Taylor	475	11.4	▲0.6
UKIP	Allen Ferguson	277	6.7	New
Majority		16	0.4	N/A
Total valid votes		4,151		
Turnout			43.0	
Registered electors		9,464		
Conservative gain from Liberal Democrats		Swing	▲5.0	

=== Church ===
Church
Party	Candidate	Votes	%	±%
Labour	Veronica Webster*	2,413	72.9	▲25.0
Conservative	Paul Barber	506	15.3	▲1.8
Liberal Democrats	Peter Gill	259	7.8	▼13.0
BNP	Andrew Leary	130	3.9	▼3.3
Majority		1,907	57.6	▲30.5
Total valid votes		3,308	37.4	
Turnout			37.9	
Registered electors				
Labour hold		Swing	▲11.6	

=== Derby ===
Derby
Party	Candidate	Votes	%	±%
Labour	Dave Robinson	2,071	75.8	▲19.0
UKIP	John Rice	404	14.8	▼13.1
Liberal Democrats	Jennifer Robertson	107	3.9	▼6.6
Conservative	Kenneth Parry	95	3.5	▼1.3
English Democrat	Dean McGrane	55	2.0	New
Majority		1,667	61.0	▲32.1
Total valid votes		2,732	30.2	
Turnout			30.6	
Registered electors		9,053		
Labour hold		Swing	▲16.1	

=== Duke's ===
Duke's
Party	Candidate	Votes	%	±%
Conservative	Pat Ball	1,475	38.0	▼13.3
Liberal Democrats	Tony Dawson	1,152	29.7	▲4.8
Labour	Catherine Cookson	581	15.0	▲5.4
Southport Party	Harry Forster	376	9.7	▼4.5
UKIP	John Lyon-Taylor	296	7.6	New
Majority		323	8.3	▼18.1
Total valid votes		3,880	39.1	
Turnout			39.6	
Registered electors		9,913		
Conservative hold		Swing	▼9.1	

=== Ford ===
Ford
Party	Candidate	Votes	%	±%
Labour	Kevin Cluskey*	2,281	80.4	▲17.6
UKIP	Philip Wordley	205	7.2	▲1.9
Conservative	Jessaine Hounslea	196	6.9	▼2.7
Liberal Democrats	Nicola Smith	84	3.0	▼9.0
BNP	Jane Leary	71	2.5	▼7.8
Majority		2,076	73.2	▲22.4
Total valid votes		2,837	32.0	
Turnout			32.1	
Registered electors		8,876		
Labour hold		Swing	▲7.9	

=== Harington ===
Harington
Party	Candidate	Votes	%	±%
Conservative	Gillian Cuthbertson*	2,646	56.7	▼9.4
Labour	Ben Bentley	1,519	32.5	▲16.6
Liberal Democrats	Dru Haydon	504	10.8	▼7.1
Majority		1,127	24.1	▼24.1
Total valid votes		4,669	48.1	
Turnout			48.7	
Registered electors		9,710		
Conservative hold		Swing	▲13.0	

=== Kew ===
Kew
Party	Candidate	Votes	%	±%
Liberal Democrats	Mike Booth*	1,132	34.8	▼16.3
Labour	Richard Owens	867	26.6	▲19.3
Conservative	Cath Regan	777	23.9	▼0.7
UKIP	Mike Lewtas	481	14.8	New
Majority		265	8.1	▼18.4
Total valid votes		3,257	35.2	
Turnout			35.6	
Registered electors		9,252		
Liberal Democrats hold		Swing	▼17.8	

=== Linacre ===
Linacre
Party	Candidate	Votes	%	±%
Labour	John Fairclough*	1,758	81.7	▼4.6
UKIP	Robin-Michael Thompson	191	8.9	New
Liberal Democrats	Colin Anderson	110	5.1	New
Conservative	Thomas Moylan	93	4.3	New
Majority		1,567	72.8	▲0.2
Total valid votes		2,152	27.5	
Turnout			27.8	
Registered electors		7,821		
Labour hold		Swing	▼6.8	

=== Litherland ===
Litherland
Party	Candidate	Votes	%	±%
Labour	Paul Tweed*	2,132	84.7	▲14.6
Conservative	Helen Barber	235	9.3	▼2.0
Liberal Democrats	Daniel Lewis	151	6.0	New
Majority		1,897	75.3	▲16.5
Total valid votes		2,518	30.6	
Turnout			31.0	
Registered electors		8,230		
Labour hold		Swing	▲8.3	

=== Manor ===
Manor
Party	Candidate	Votes	%	±%
Labour	Diane Roberts	2,324	53.7	▲22.2
Conservative	Martyn Barber*	1,538	35.5	▼12.6
Liberal Democrats	James Ludley	468	10.8	▼9.6
Majority		786	18.2	N/A
Total valid votes		4,330	44.5	
Turnout			44.9	
Registered electors		9,725		
Labour gain from Conservative		Swing	▲17.4	

=== Meols ===
Meols
Party	Candidate	Votes	%	±%
Liberal Democrats	Nigel Ashton	1,211	30.5	▼22.6
Conservative	Chris Cross	1,136	28.7	▼1.3
Labour	Maureen Stoker	711	17.9	▲13.1
Southport Party	Margaret Brown	628	15.8	▲3.6
UKIP	Patricia Shanks	278	7.0	New
Majority		75	1.9	▼21.2
Total valid votes		3,964	40.6	
Turnout			40.9	
Registered electors		9,760		
Liberal Democrats hold		Swing	▼10.7	

=== Molyneux ===
Molyneux
Party	Candidate	Votes	%	±%
Labour	Marion Atkinson	2,494	57.8	▲36.3
Liberal Democrats	Jack Colbert	1,004	23.3	▼32.7
Conservative	John Jarvis	416	9.6	▼1.6
UKIP	Peter Harper	404	9.4	▼1.9
Majority		1,490	34.5	N/A
Total valid votes		4,318	43.4	
Turnout			43.8	
Registered electors		9,940		
Labour gain from Liberal Democrats		Swing	▲34.5	

=== Netherton and Orrell ===
Netherton and Orrell
Party	Candidate	Votes	%	±%
Labour	Susan Bradshaw	2,206	74.7	▲11.9
UKIP	Pat Gaskell	271	9.2	▼7.0
Conservative	Michael McGrady	200	6.8	New
TUSC	Peter Glover	181	6.1	New
Liberal Democrats	Carol Hill	97	3.3	New
Majority		1,935	65.5	▲23.7
Total valid votes		2,955	33.8	
Turnout			33.9	
Registered electors		8,754		
Labour hold		Swing	▲9.5	

=== Norwood ===
Norwood
Party	Candidate	Votes	%	±%
Liberal Democrats	Marianne Welsh	1,121	31.8	▼22.6
Labour	Mike Nolan	931	26.4	▲16.3
Conservative	Graham Campbell	629	17.9	▼0.7
Southport Party	Jim Ford	570	16.2	▲6.1
UKIP	Gordon Ferguson	269	7.6	New
Majority		190	5.4	▼30.4
Total valid votes		3,520	35.0	
Turnout			35.3	
Registered electors		10,063		
Liberal Democrats hold		Swing	▼19.5	

=== Park ===
Park
Party	Candidate	Votes	%	±%
Liberal Democrats	Tony Robertson	1,480	37.4	▼23.8
Labour	Kris Brown	1,411	35.6	▲22.1
Conservative	Alex Orme	867	21.9	▲2.2
Green	Roy Greason	200	5.1	New
Majority		69	1.7	▼39.8
Total valid votes		3,958	41.2	
Turnout			41.5	
Registered electors		9,612		
Liberal Democrats hold		Swing	▼23.0	

=== Ravenmeols ===
Ravenmeols
Party	Candidate	Votes	%	±%
Labour	Catie Page	2,032	44.6	▲16.8
Conservative	Debi Jones	1,974	43.3	▼12.5
Liberal Democrats	Linda Hough	307	6.7	▼9.7
Green	Richard Willis	241	5.3	New
Majority		58	1.3	N/A
Total valid votes		4,554	48.6	
Turnout			49.0	
Registered electors		9,378		
Labour gain from Conservative		Swing	▲14.7	

=== St. Oswald ===
St. Oswald
Party	Candidate	Votes	%	±%
Labour	Mark Dowd*	2,405	89.1	▲9.7
Conservative	Nigel Barber	200	7.4	▼13.2
Liberal Democrats	Graham Farrell	94	3.5	New
Majority		2,205	81.7	▲22.9
Total valid votes		2,699	31.9	
Turnout			32.0	
Registered electors		8,465		
Labour hold		Swing	▲11.5	

=== Sudell ===
Sudell
Party	Candidate	Votes	%	±%
Labour	Patrick McKinley	2,314	53.3	▲35.7
Liberal Democrats	Sylvia Mainey*	1,169	26.9	▼28.2
Conservative	Wendy Moore	713	16.4	▼6.6
Green	Andrew Rossall	143	3.3	New
Majority		1,145	26.4	N/A
Total valid votes		4,339	43.7	
Turnout			44.1	
Registered electors		9,932		
Labour gain from Liberal Democrats		Swing	▲32.0	

=== Victoria ===
Victoria
Party	Candidate	Votes	%	±%
Labour	Leslie Byrom	2,258	49.5	▲13.7
Liberal Democrats	Peter Hough*	1,442	31.6	▼9.8
Conservative	Sharon Hutchinson	575	12.6	▼4.1
UKIP	Michael Kelly	289	6.3	▲0.2
Majority		816	17.9	N/A
Total valid votes		4,564	44.7	
Turnout			45.3	
Registered electors		10,202		
Labour gain from Liberal Democrats		Swing	▲11.8	
