= 2021 Sefton Metropolitan Borough Council election =

Map showing the results of the 2021 Sefton Metropolitan Borough Council election

The 2021 Sefton Metropolitan Borough Council election took place on 6 May 2021 to elect members of Sefton Council in England. This was on the same day as other local elections. One-third of the seats were up for election, with two wards (Blundellsands and Derby) electing two councillors.

== Results ==
2021 Sefton Metropolitan Borough Council election
Party	This election			Full council			This election		
Party	Seats	Net	Seats %	Other	Total	Total %	Votes	Votes %	+/−
Labour	19	▲6	79.2	29	48	72.7	33,974	46.6	+3.3
Conservative	3	▲2	12.5	5	8	12.1	18,935	26.0	+10.4
Liberal Democrats	2	▼5	8.3	6	8	12.1	10,258	14.1	-6.8
FRAG (Note: Formby Residents Action Group)	0	Steady	0.0	2	2	3.0	1,591	2.2	-1.7
Green	0	Steady	0.0	0	0	0.0	5,130	7.0	New
Independent	0	▼3	0.0	0	0	0.0	2,715	3.7	+1.3
Liberal	0	Steady	0.0	0	0	0.0	167	0.2	New
Workers Party	0	Steady	0.0	0	0	0.0	108	0.1	New
Freedom Alliance	0	Steady	0.0	0	0	0.0	48	0.1	New

== Ward results ==
=== Ainsdale ===
Ainsdale
Party	Candidate	Votes	%	±%
Liberal Democrats	Lynne Thompson	1,807	44.53	▼2.93
Conservative	Michael Shaw	1,253	30.88	
Labour	Sean Flynn	789	19.44	
Green	Laurence Rankin	209	5.15	
Majority		554	13.65	
Turnout		4,053		
Liberal Democrats hold		Swing		

=== Birkdale ===
Birkdale
Party	Candidate	Votes	%	±%
Labour	Sonya Kelly	1,125	32.73	
Conservative	Lee Durkin	1,099	31.98	
Liberal Democrats	Vic Foulds	1,006	29.27	
Green	Bernhard Frank	207	6.02	
Majority		26	0.76	
Turnout		3,437		
Labour gain from Liberal Democrats		Swing		

=== Blundellsands ===
Blundellsands
Party	Candidate	Votes	%	±%
Labour	Diane Roscoe	2,031	52.4	
Labour	Natasha Carlin	1,734	44.7	
Conservative	Martyn Barber	1,133	29.2	
Conservative	Simon Jamieson	927	23.9	
Green	John Volynchook	509	13.1	
Liberal Democrats	Keith Cawdron	279	7.2	
Liberal Democrats	Brian Dunning	181	4.7	
Liberal	Angela Preston	167	4.3	
Labour hold		Swing		
Labour hold		Swing		

=== Cambridge ===
Cambridge
Party	Candidate	Votes	%	±%
Conservative	Sinclair D'Albuquerque	1,455	41.6	
Liberal Democrats	Pat Keith	1,244	35.5	
Labour	Laura Lunn Bates	596	17.0	
Green	Carla Fox	205	5.9	
Majority		211		
Turnout				
Conservative gain from Liberal Democrats		Swing		

=== Church ===
Church
Party	Candidate	Votes	%	±%
Labour	Paul Cummins	1,727	63.7	
Green	Mike Carter	571	21.1	
Conservative	Sean Dorgan	305	11.3	
Liberal Democrats	Zanna Ashton	107	3.9	
Majority		1,156		
Turnout				
Labour hold		Swing		

=== Derby ===
Derby
Party	Candidate	Votes	%	±%
Labour	Anne Thompson	1,479	63.6	
Labour	Brenda O'Brien	1,290	55.5	
Independent	Mike Brennan	501	21.5	
Conservative	Daniel Nuttall	176	7.6	
Green	Alwynne Cartmell	149	6.4	
Conservative	Anne Clegg	115	4.9	
Independent	Michael Duffy	111	4.8	
Independent	Peter Nelson	100	4.3	
Majority				
Turnout				
Labour hold		Swing		
Labour hold		Swing		

=== Dukes ===
Dukes
Party	Candidate	Votes	%	±%
Conservative	Mike Prendergast	1,576	41.8	
Independent	Tony Dawson	816	21.7	
Liberal Democrats	David Newman	606	16.1	
Labour	Thomas Spring	551	14.6	
Green	Robert Doyle	219	5.8	
Majority		760		
Turnout				
Conservative gain from Liberal Democrats		Swing		

The incumbent, Tony Dawson, was elected as a Liberal Democrat but suspended in 2017.

=== Ford ===
Ford
Party	Candidate	Votes	%	±%
Labour	Paulette Lappin	1,501	63.4	
Independent	John McDonald	306	12.9	
Conservative	Veronica Dorgan	201	8.5	
Green	Kieran Dams	198	8.4	
Workers Party	Chris Haws	108	4.6	
Liberal Democrats	Rowenna Gibson	52	2.2	
Majority		1,195		
Turnout				
Labour hold		Swing		

=== Harington ===
Harington
Party	Candidate	Votes	%	±%
Conservative	Joe Riley	1,731	42.8	
Labour	Carol Richards	1,344	33.3	
Formby Residents Action Group	Aimee Brodie	448	11.1	
Green	Mike Walsh	297	7.4	
Liberal Democrats	Annie Gorski	172	4.3	
Freedom Alliance	Joanne Allman	48	1.2	
Majority		387		
Turnout				
Conservative hold		Swing		

=== Kew ===
Kew
Party	Candidate	Votes	%	±%
Labour	Jennifer Corcoran	1,079	36.6	
Conservative	Laura Nuttall	905	30.7	
Liberal Democrats	Jo Barton	768	26.0	
Green	Fred Weavers	200	6.8	
Majority		174		
Turnout				
Labour gain from Liberal Democrats		Swing		

=== Linacre ===
Linacre
Party	Candidate	Votes	%	±%
Labour	Christine Maher	1,560	88.8	
Conservative	Lynne Bold	196	11.2	
Majority		1,364	77.6	
Labour hold		Swing		

=== Litherland ===
Litherland
Party	Candidate	Votes	%	±%
Labour	Trish Hardy	1,484	63.8	
Independent	Mo Walker-Miller	507	21.8	
Conservative	Jessamine Hounslea	154	6.6	
Green	Jay Robinson	146	6.3	
Independent	Billie Gibson	34	1.5	
Majority		977		
Turnout				
Labour hold		Swing		

=== Manor ===
Manor
Party	Candidate	Votes	%	±%
Labour	John Kelly	1,497	47.8	
Conservative	Jan Blanchard	996	31.8	
Green	Andy Donegan	328	10.5	
Liberal Democrats	John Gibson	311	9.9	
Majority		501		
Turnout				
Labour hold		Swing		

=== Meols ===
Meols
Party	Candidate	Votes	%	±%
Liberal Democrats	John Dodd	1,692	48.0	
Conservative	Thomas de Freitas	1,112	31.5	
Labour	Stephen Jowett	470	13.3	
Green	David Collins	253	7.2	
Majority		580		
Turnout				
Liberal Democrats hold		Swing		

=== Molyneux ===
Molyneux
Party	Candidate	Votes	%	±%
Labour	Paula Murphy	1,949	66.7	
Conservative	Paul Barber	547	18.7	
Green	Marion Wykes	254	8.7	
Liberal Democrats	Duncan Sayer	174	6.0	
Majority		1,402		
Turnout				
Labour hold		Swing		

=== Netherton and Orrell ===
Netherton and Orrell
Party	Candidate	Votes	%	±%
Labour	Robert Brennan	1,785	75.2	
Independent	Lisa Ford	340	14.3	
Conservative	Andrew Burgess	248	10.5	
Majority		1,445		
Turnout				
Labour hold		Swing		

=== Norwood ===
Norwood
Party	Candidate	Votes	%	±%
Labour	Carran Waterfield	1,326	43.7	
Conservative	Pam Teesdale	848	28.0	
Liberal Democrats	Alistair West	629	20.8	
Green	Dave McIntosh	228	7.5	
Majority		478		
Turnout				
Labour hold		Swing		

=== Park ===
Park
Party	Candidate	Votes	%	±%
Labour	Andrew Wilson	1,733	53.9	
Conservative	Ken Hughes	1,116	34.7	
Green	Roy Greason	365	11.4	
Majority		617		
Turnout				
Labour gain from Independent		Swing		

=== Ravenmeols ===
Ravenmeols
Party	Candidate	Votes	%	±%
Labour	Catie Page	1,460	38.6	
Formby Residents Action Group	Bob McCann	1,143	30.3	
Conservative	Paul Bowen	872	23.1	
Green	Alison Gibbon	212	5.6	
Liberal Democrats	Lesley Delves	91	2.4	
Majority		317		
Turnout				
Labour gain from Independent		Swing		

=== St Oswald ===
St Oswald
Party	Candidate	Votes	%	±%
Labour	Linda Cluskey	1,557	85.6	
Conservative	Maureen Burgess	262	14.4	
Majority		1,295	71.2	
Turnout		1,819		
Labour hold		Swing		

=== Sudell ===
Sudell
Party	Candidate	Votes	%	±%
Labour	James Hansen	1,766	50.6	
Conservative	Tom Hughes	1,268	36.1	
Green	Alex Wareing	259	7.4	
Workers Party	Robert Green	209	6.0	
Majority		508		
Turnout				
Labour gain from Independent		Swing		

=== Victoria ===
Victoria
Party	Candidate	Votes	%	±%
Labour	Michael Roche	2,141	53.0	
Liberal Democrats	Hannah Gee	1,139	28.2	
Conservative	Michael Crichton	440	10.9	
Green	Neil Doolin	321	7.9	
Majority		1,002		
Turnout				
Labour hold		Swing		
