= 2012 Sefton Metropolitan Borough Council election =

2012 UK local government election

Map of the results of the 2012 Sefton council election. Labour in red, Liberal Democrats in yellow and Conservatives in blue.

The 2012 Sefton Metropolitan Borough Council election took place on 3 May 2012 to elect members of Sefton Metropolitan Borough Council in England, as part of the 2012 United Kingdom local elections. 22 seats, representing one third of the total Council membership, were up for election in single-member wards. Ten – nearly half – of the members elected were newcomers to the council; five of these defeated sitting Councillors seeking re-election, whilst in the other five wards, the incumbent retired. Two incumbents stood under different labels to those they were elected under in 2008; both were defeated in their wards.

The election resulted in a landslide for the Labour Party, which won 48% of the popular vote and 15 of the seats up for election – more than double the seven it went into the election with. Labour won a clean sweep in the southern constituencies of Sefton Central and Bootle. This brought the total number of seats controlled by Labour on the Council up to 36 giving the party an overall majority of six. As a result, the Sefton Labour Group formed a majority administration for the first time since the council's creation in 1973. Although the party failed to make a breakthrough in the northern town of Southport, it did win more than 20% of the popular vote there, a feat it has not achieved at a general election since 1966. The party also out-polled Conservative Party in three of Southport's seven wards and out-polled a sitting Councillor (in Duke's Ward) for the first time in years.

The election representing a serious defeat for the other three parties defending seats. All incumbent Conservatives seeking re-election were defeated, including group leader Paula Parry who lost her Blundellsands ward to Labour on a swing of nearly 22%. Only one Conservative was elected; newcomer Ted Hartill successfully defended outgoing deputy leader Brenda Porter's seat of Ainsdale, though the Conservative margin of victory was cut from 45 in 2008 to just 15 points. They lost a third of the support they had attained in the 2011 borough election, falling into third place in terms of votes and being left with just eight seats on the council. Their 17% share of the vote was well below the national party's 31%.

For the Liberal Democrats, the result was slightly better but still represented a crushing defeat for a party that only two years previously had been the largest on Sefton Council. They gained two seats in Southport from the Conservatives (including one Independent Conservative) and retained all the seats they were defending there but lost all five they were defending in the south of the borough to Labour, reducing their overall strength from 23 to 20. Their share of the vote was only 19% across all of Sefton however, scarcely more than the party's national average of 16% and leaving them nearly thirty points behind Labour. In roughly a third of the seats up for election the Lib Dems won less than 100 votes.

Additionally, the UK Independence Party lost its sole seat on the council. Former Conservative Councillor and mayor Alf Doran, who had crossed the floor to join UKIP in 2011, was defeated in his bid to be re-elected. He finished a close third, just 77 votes behind the Conservatives and 85 behind the victorious Labour Party. No other party was able to return members to the council; only the local issues Southport Party came remotely close in Norwood, where its candidate finished a distant third behind Labour and the Lib Dems. The only independent, a former Conservative Councillor seeking re-election, was defeated.

== Ward results ==
Asterisk (*) denotes an incumbent seeking re-election.

Ainsdale
Party	Candidate	Votes	%	±%
Conservative	Ted Hartill	1,446	38	
Liberal Democrats	Lynne Thompson	869	23	
Labour	Stephen Jowett	653	17	
UKIP	Jim Doyle	624	17	
Green	Barbara Dutton	180	5	
Majority		577		
Turnout		3,772	39	
Conservative hold		Swing	3% Con to Lib Dem	

Birkdale
Party	Candidate	Votes	%	±%
Liberal Democrats	Richard Hands*	1,225	39	
UKIP	Terry Durrance	707	22	
Labour	Ged Wright	688	22	
Conservative	Nigel Ball	555	17	
Majority		518		
Turnout		3,175	33	
Liberal Democrats hold		Swing	6.5% Con to Lib Dem	

Blundellsands
Party	Candidate	Votes	%	±%
Labour	Veronica Bennett	2,117	53	
Conservative	Paula Parry*	1,448	36	
UKIP	Tony Ledgerton	179	5	
Green	Laurence Rankin	138	3	
Liberal Democrats	Kris Brown	87	2	
Majority		669		
Turnout		3,969	45	
Labour gain from Conservative		Swing		

Cambridge
Party	Candidate	Votes	%	±%
Liberal Democrats	Pat Keith*	1,459	42	
Conservative	Cath Regan	734	21	
UKIP	Gordon Ferguson	720	21	
Labour	Muriel Langley	566	16	
Majority		725		
Turnout		3,479	37	
Liberal Democrats gain from Conservative		Swing	11.5% Con to Lib Dem	

Church
Party	Candidate	Votes	%	±%
Labour	Paul Cummins*	1,930	73	
UKIP	Joseph Hedgecock	265	10	
Conservative	Helen Barber	187	7	
Green	Julia Thorne	185	7	
Liberal Democrats	Sylvia Mainey	75	3	
Majority		1,665		
Turnout		2,642	30	
Labour hold		Swing		

Derby
Party	Candidate	Votes	%	±%
Labour	Carol Gustafson*	1,809	81	
UKIP	John Rice	302	14	
Conservative	Alex McIvor	64	3	
Liberal Democrats	Jennifer Robertson	56	3	
Majority		1,507		
Turnout		2,231	25	
Labour hold		Swing		

Dukes
Party	Candidate	Votes	%	±%
Liberal Democrats	Tony Dawson	996	30	
Conservative	Bob Ayres	827	25	
Labour	Peter Gaffney	473	14	
UKIP	John Lyon-Taylor	390	12	
Southport Party	Harry Forster	359	11	
Independent	David Pearson*	288	9	
Majority		169		
Turnout		2,387		
Liberal Democrats gain from Independent		Swing	6.5% Con to Lib Dem	

Ford
Party	Candidate	Votes	%	±%
Labour	Paulette Lappin	1,872	81	
UKIP	Philip Wordley	307	13	
Conservative	Veronica Murphy	84	4	
Liberal Democrats	Winifred Maher	54	2	
Majority		1,565		
Turnout		2,317	26	
Labour hold		Swing		

Harington
Party	Candidate	Votes	%	±%
Labour	Nina Killen	1,146	31	
Conservative	Simon Jamieson	1,138	31	
UKIP	Alf Doran*	1,061	29	
Liberal Democrats	Dru Haydon	321	9	
Majority		8		
Turnout		3,666	38	
Labour gain from UKIP		Swing		

Kew
Party	Candidate	Votes	%	±%
Liberal Democrats	Maureen Fearn*	1,028	37	
Labour	Janet Harrison	800	29	
UKIP	Michael Lewtas	578	21	
Conservative	Chris Cross	390	14	
Majority		228		
Turnout		2,796	30	
Liberal Democrats hold		Swing		

Linacre
Party	Candidate	Votes	%	±%
Labour	Doreen Kerrigan*	1,682	92	
Liberal Democrats	James Murray	74	4	
Conservative	Marika Jenkins	73	4	
Majority		1,608		
Turnout		1,829	23	
Labour hold		Swing		

Litherland
Party	Candidate	Votes	%	±%
Labour	Patricia Hardy*	1,705	80	
UKIP	Sheila Grace	174	8	
Conservative	Jessamine Hounslea	159	7	
Liberal Democrats	Daniel Lewis	95	4	
Majority		1,531		
Turnout		2,133	26	
Labour hold		Swing		

Manor
Party	Candidate	Votes	%	±%
Labour	John Kelly	1,908	59	
Conservative	Sharon Hutchinson	749	23	
UKIP	Craig Hughes	362	11	
Liberal Democrats	Carol Tonkiss	235	7	
Majority		1,159		
Turnout		3,254	33	
Labour gain from Liberal Democrats		Swing		

Meols
Party	Candidate	Votes	%	±%
Liberal Democrats	John Dodd*	1,327	40	
Conservative	Sarah Jackson	600	18	
Labour	Maureen Stoker	560	17	
Southport Party	Margaret Brown	489	15	
UKIP	Patricia Shanks	372	11	
Majority		727		
Turnout		3,348	35	
Liberal Democrats hold		Swing	10% Con to Lib Dem	

Molyneux
Party	Candidate	Votes	%	±%
Labour	Paula Murphy	1,888	59	
Liberal Democrats	Peter Gill	659	20	
UKIP	Peter Harper	405	13	
Conservative	Nigel Barber	201	6	
Green	Tony Christian	69	2	
Majority		1,229		
Turnout		3,222	33	
Labour gain from Liberal Democrats		Swing		

Netherton & Orrell
Party	Candidate	Votes	%	±%
Labour	Robert Brennan*	1,804	74	
UKIP	Pat Gaskell	241	10	
TUSC	Peter Glover	227	9	
Conservative	Viv Becker	108	4	
Liberal Democrats	Carol Hill	59	2	
Majority		1,503		
Turnout		2,439	28	
Labour hold		Swing		

Norwood
Party	Candidate	Votes	%	±%
Liberal Democrats	Ronnie Fearn*	1,215	39	
Labour	Lesley Delves	820	27	
Southport Party	Jacqueline Barlow	555	18	
Conservative	Graham Campbell	343	11	
Green	Neville Grundy	147	5	
Majority		395		
Turnout		3,080	31	
Liberal Democrats hold		Swing		

Park
Party	Candidate	Votes	%	±%
Labour	Stephen Kermode	2,027	53	
Liberal Democrats	Robbie Fenton*	1,145	30	
UKIP	Peter Gannon	304	8	
Conservative	Martyn Barber	295	8	
Green	Roy Greason	81	2	
Majority		882		
Turnout		3,852	40	
Labour gain from Liberal Democrats		Swing		

Ravenmeols
Party	Candidate	Votes	%	±%
Labour	Peter Maguire	2,163	54	
Conservative	Barry Griffiths	1,260	32	
UKIP	Nicola Ledgerton	380	10	
Green	Richard Willis	172	4	
Majority		903		
Turnout		3,975	43	
Labour gain from Conservative		Swing		

St. Oswald
Party	Candidate	Votes	%	±%
Labour	James Mahon*	2,035	91	
Conservative	Michael Dandy	112	5	
Liberal Democrats	James Ludley	79	4	
Majority		1,923		
Turnout		2,226	27	
Labour hold		Swing		

Sudell
Party	Candidate	Votes	%	±%
Labour	Lynn Gatherer	2,124	59	
Liberal Democrats	Clifford Mainey*	820	23	
UKIP	Gordon Kinread	286	8	
Conservative	Wendy Moore	285	8	
Green	Andrew Rossall	86	2	
Majority		1,304		
Turnout		3,601	36	
Labour gain from Liberal Democrats		Swing		

Victoria
Party	Candidate	Votes	%	±%
Labour	Michael Roche	2,114	59	
Liberal Democrats	Jack Colbert	889	25	
Conservative	Paul Barber	329	9	
UKIP	Mike Kelly	267	7	
Majority		1,225		
Turnout		3,599	36	
Labour gain from Liberal Democrats		Swing		
